= Vale do Aço metropolitan area =

Vale do Aço Metropolitan Area
- Metropolitan Area of Brazil
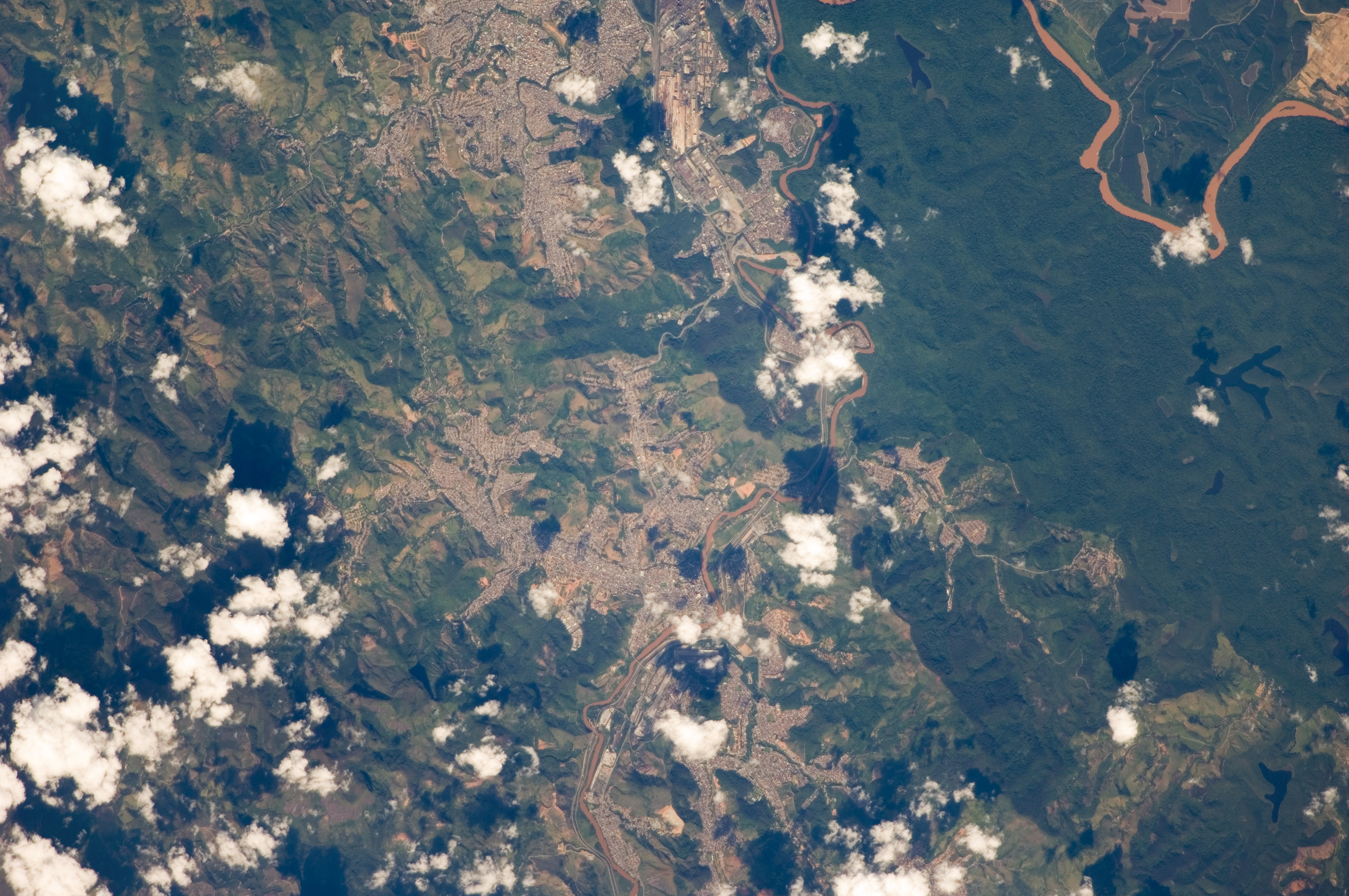
- Satellite image showing Coronel Fabriciano (center of the image) and parts of Ipatinga (above) and Timóteo (below).

- Coordinates: 19°28′33″S 42°31′48″W
- Country: Brazil
- Region: Southeast
- State: Minas Gerais
- Law: Complementary Law No. 51
- Founded: 30 December 1998
- Seat: No official seat city. However, the metropolitan agency is headquartered in Ipatinga.
- Municipalities: 4 main municipalities 24 in the metropolitan belt

Area
  - Total: 806.584 km^{2} (311.424 sq mi)

Population (IBGE Census/2022)
  - Total: 458,846
  - Density: 568.876/km^{2} (1,473.38/sq mi)
- Time zone: UTC-3 (BST)
  - Summer (DST): UTC-2 (BDT)
- Postal Code: 30000-000
- Area code: +55 31
- HDI (UNDP/2010): 0.745
- GDP (IBGE/2015): R$13,226,864.29
- GDP per capita (IBGE/2015): R$27,223.95

The Vale do Aço Metropolitan Region (RMVA), commonly known as Vale do Aço, is a Brazilian metropolitan region located in the interior of the state of Minas Gerais, in the Southeast Region of Brazil. It was established by Complementary Law No. 51 on 30 December 1998 and officially designated as a metropolitan region on 12 January 2006. Situated in the Vale do Rio Doce, it comprises the cities of Coronel Fabriciano, Ipatinga, Santana do Paraíso, and Timóteo, along with a metropolitan belt consisting of 24 additional municipalities.

The region's exploration, which began in the 16th century but intensified in the 19th century, led to the emergence of the first urban centers, giving rise to several municipalities in the metropolitan belt. Due to the vast forests, the area was initially known as Vale Verde (Green Valley). The construction of the Vitória-Minas Railway between 1911 and 1929 facilitated colonization, but the establishment of Belgo-Mineira in Coronel Fabriciano in 1936 was pivotal in accelerating population growth, deforestation, and the development of housing, businesses, and streets. The establishment of Acesita (in Timóteo) and Usiminas (in Ipatinga) in the 1940s and 1950s, respectively, further provided basic infrastructure and recreational spaces, solidifying the integration of the current cities, which were under Coronel Fabriciano's jurisdiction until 1964.

Due to the economic significance of the steel industries, the region became known as Vale do Aço (Steel Valley). It gained international recognition for its major local companies, such as Aperam South America (formerly Acesita), Cenibra, and Usiminas. Despite its relatively recent settlement, it is one of the main urban hubs in the state's interior. According to statistics from the IBGE, the four main municipalities had a combined population of 458,846 inhabitants in 2022. Attractions such as the Rio Doce State Park, the Ipanema Park, and Serra dos Cocais are also present in the RMVA, alongside handicrafts, rural congado groups, and cultural spaces such as the Aperam Acesita Foundation and the Usiminas Cultural Center.

== History ==
=== Early beginnings ===
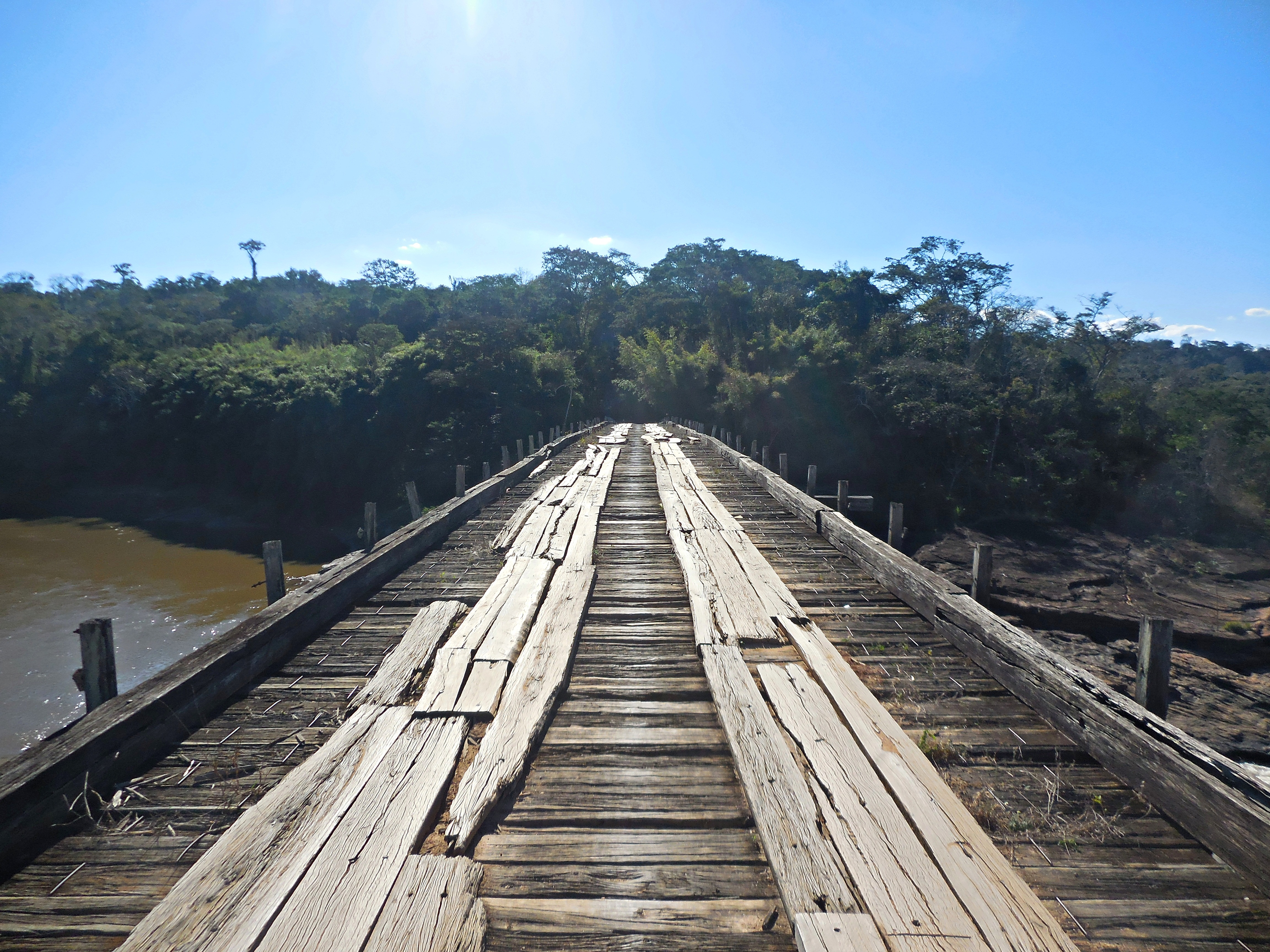
The Ponte Queimada, between Pingo-d'Água and Marliéria, lies along a section of the old Estrada do Degredo, carved through virgin forest between the 18th and 19th centuries.

Attempts to explore the Vale do Rio Doce for mineral wealth began in the 16th century but were unsuccessful. The expedition of Sebastião Fernandes Tourinho in 1573 navigated the Doce River and some of its tributaries, naming the region at the mouth of the Piracicaba River "Vale Verde" (Green Valley) due to its dense forest. In the 17th century, settlement and the opening of new trails in the Vale do Rio Doce were prohibited to prevent the smuggling of gold extracted from central Minas Gerais via the Doce River and its tributaries. In addition to the prohibition and dense forest, the rugged terrain and the fierceness of the Botocudo Indians also hindered colonization.

Settlement was permitted in 1755, following a decline in gold production in Minas Gerais. At that time, a road was opened linking Vila Rica (now Ouro Preto, then the capital of the Province of Minas Gerais) to Cuieté to transport gold extracted from the area of present-day Conselheiro Pena, which was depleted after 1780. As abundant gold was not found, the road was then used to connect Ouro Preto to a prison in Cuité, earning the name Estrada do Degredo. The existence of this road, which passed through the current municipalities of Dionísio, Marliéria, Pingo-d'Água, Entre Folhas, and Caratinga, among others in the metropolitan belt, later led to the emergence of the first settler communities in the interior of Vale Verde.

In 1800, the only reported settlement was in Antônio Dias, founded by the bandeirante Antônio Dias de Oliveira in 1706. However, in 1808, the publication of royal charters created government incentives for the colonization of the Vale do Rio Doce, authorizing land exploration and the extermination of indigenous peoples. A war against the Botocudo Indians ensued, involving settlers, immigrants, and soldiers. By 1831, a Royal Charter prohibited attacks on the Indians, but by then, they were nearly extinct. Small urban centers and occupations were reported throughout the 19th century, but they were insignificant compared to other regions of Minas Gerais, where economic activities were already well-established.

=== Settlement and urbanization ===
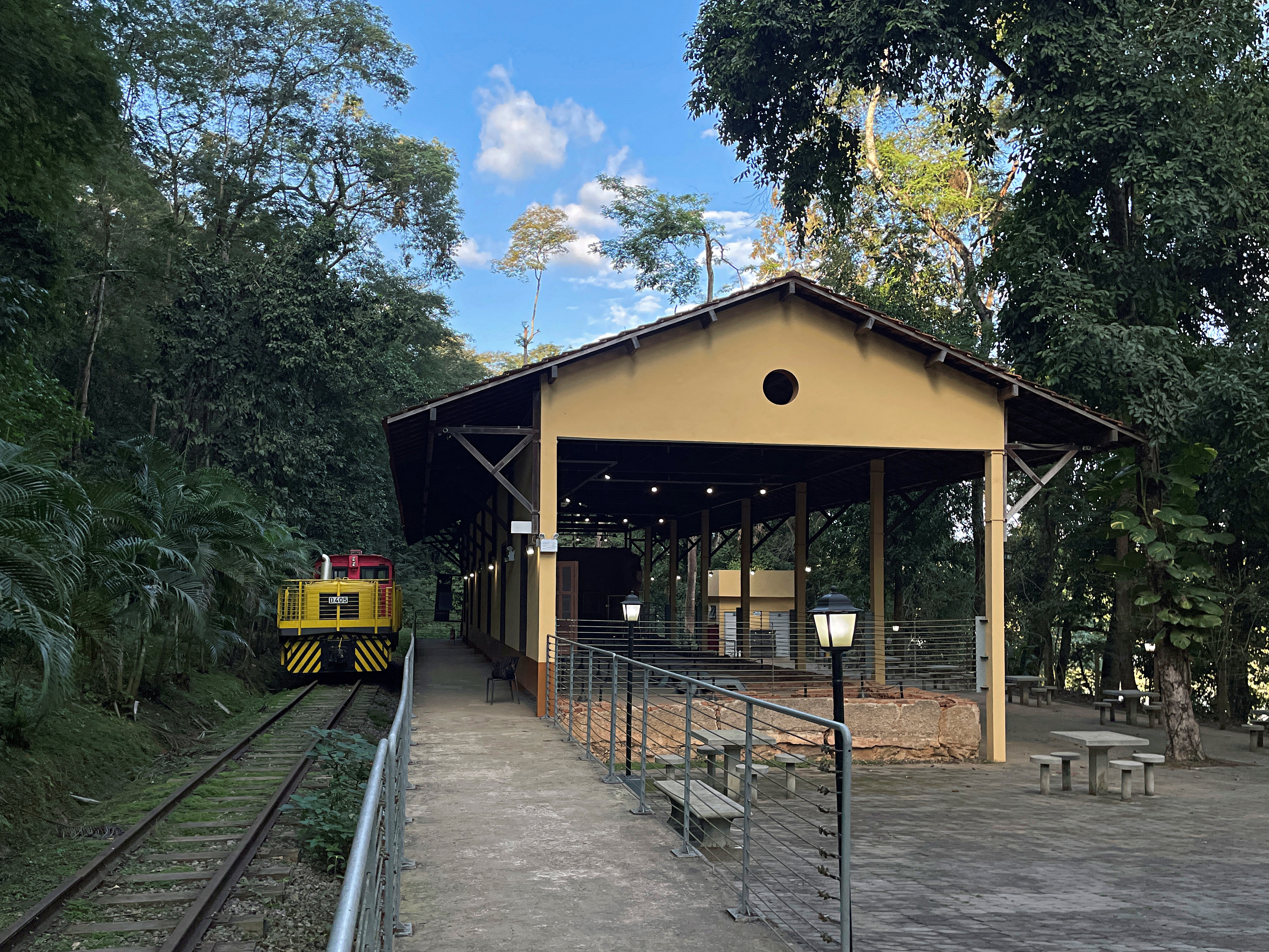
Ruins of the Estação Pedra Mole (1922) in Ipatinga, after the restoration of the structure. This was the first railway station in Vale do Aço.

At the beginning of the 20th century, the so-called Vale Verde was still sparsely populated and almost entirely covered by virtually untouched Atlantic Forest. Settlement was encouraged by the construction of the Vitória-Minas Railway (EFVM) between 1911 and 1929. Upon reaching the current municipality of Belo Oriente in the late 1910s, railway construction was halted due to World War I, but it resumed in the following decade, spurring the emergence of the first urban centers in Coronel Fabriciano and Timóteo, with the arrival of workers tasked with the construction, and later in Ipatinga. Shortly thereafter, the development of the MG-4 (now BR-381) through the region also contributed to the establishment of the urban perimeter.

In the 1930s, however, the establishment of the first industrial complexes became the primary factor in accelerating urban population growth, particularly with the Belgo-Mineira Steel Company, which sought to centralize wood extraction and charcoal production in Coronel Fabriciano, then a district of Antônio Dias, to supply its plants in João Monlevade. In the area of the former railway station in Coronel Fabriciano, Belgo-Mineira facilitated the construction of houses, businesses, and streets, encouraging population growth. The choice of this area for industrial production was enabled by the availability of transportation through the EFVM and the presence of abundant areas for raw material extraction. Acesita (now Aperam South America) and Usiminas, steel industry complexes established in 1944 and 1956, respectively, played a structural role in urban occupation and brought basic infrastructure such as healthcare facilities, schools, recreational spaces, transportation, and communications. With the arrival of these industries, the region ceased to be known as "Vale Verde" and was renamed "Vale do Aço".

Coronel Fabriciano, which became independent from Antônio Dias in 1948, was home to the industrial complexes of Acesita and Usiminas until 1964, when Timóteo and Ipatinga gained political emancipation, and the companies were transferred to these municipalities, respectively. In these cities, both companies were responsible for building numerous residential complexes to house employees, which later gave rise to the current neighborhoods. Even after losing the industrial complexes, Coronel Fabriciano continued to experience population growth due to the presence of the industries, but in a disorderly and unplanned manner, unlike the areas surrounding the plants in neighboring cities. The outskirts of Timóteo and Ipatinga, however, saw uncontrolled growth from the non-industrial population attracted by local progress. Urbanization intensified again in the 1970s with the establishment of Cenibra in the district of Perpétuo Socorro, in Belo Oriente. Like the industrial complexes in Timóteo and Ipatinga, it was positioned parallel to the BR-381, the Vitória-Minas Railway, and a water source (the Doce River in this case).

=== Metropolitan consolidation ===
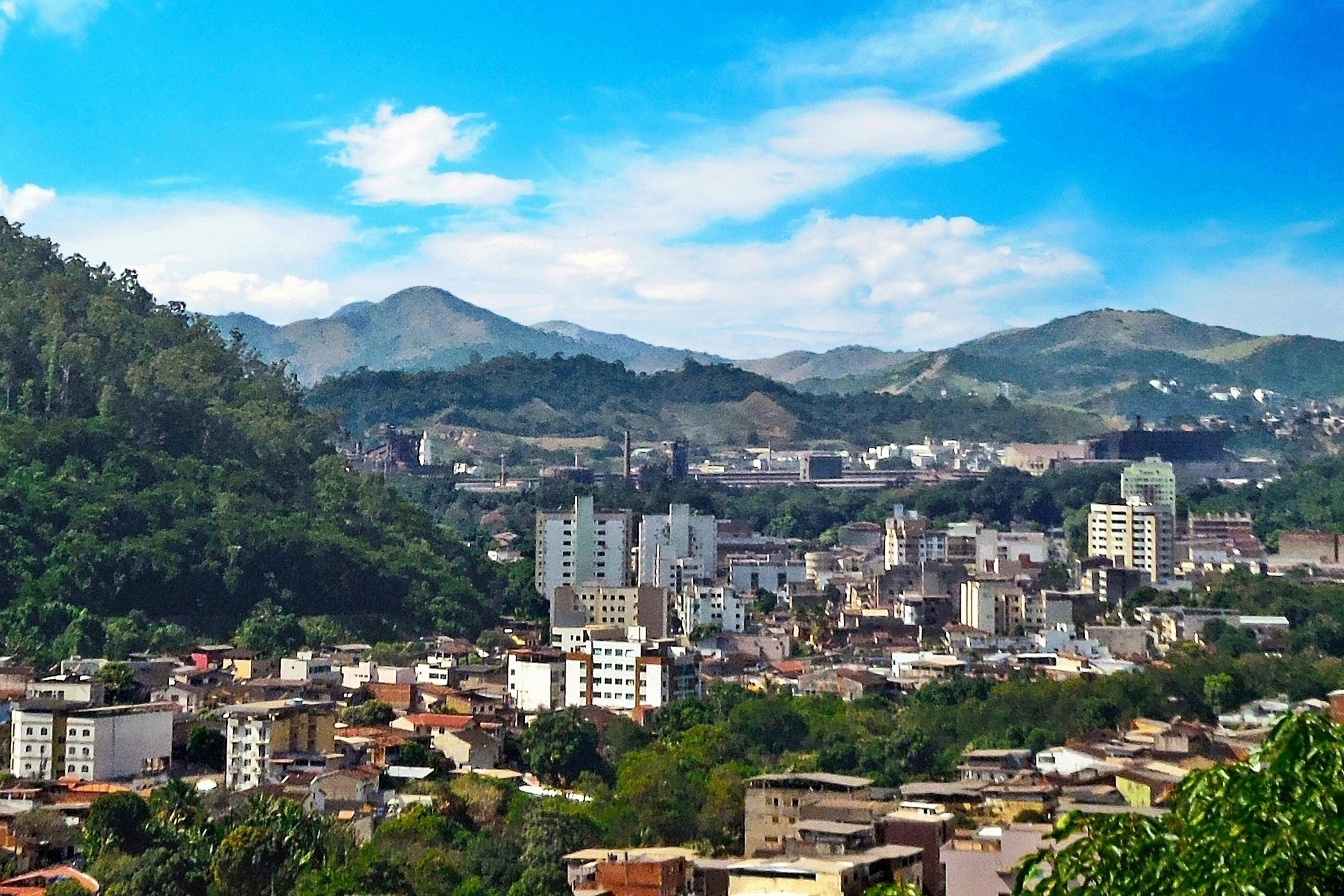
The Centro-Norte region of Timóteo (also called "Acesita Center" due to the historical influence of the company), with the Aperam plant visible in the background.

In 1974, the first commission was formed to advocate for the recognition of Vale do Aço as an urban agglomeration, securing an audience with then-governor Rondon Pacheco in Belo Horizonte and obtaining funds for the project's implementation. That same year, the Association of Municipalities of the Vale do Aço Microregion (AMVA) was created. During the 1980s and 1990s, Santana do Paraíso, Belo Oriente, and part of Caratinga became part of the urban agglomeration.

Conversely, Coronel Fabriciano, Ipatinga, and Timóteo began to experience a reduction in growth rates due to the limited availability of areas for urban expansion. This slowdown had previously been observed only in cities within the current metropolitan belt, where rural exodus was significant during the second half of the 20th century, leading to population decline. Due to its proximity to Ipatinga's urban perimeter and easy access via the BR-458, the municipality of Santana do Paraíso, emancipated in 1992, experienced the highest population growth rates between the 1990s and 2000s.

The conurbation process known as Vale do Aço was recognized for its functional unity by Complementary Law No. 51 of 30 December 1998, integrating the municipalities of Coronel Fabriciano, Ipatinga, Santana do Paraíso, and Timóteo, along with 22 municipalities in the metropolitan belt. It was organized and officially designated as a metropolitan region by Complementary Law No. 90 of 12 January 2006. The Vale do Aço Metropolitan Agency, headquartered in Ipatinga, was established by Complementary Law No. 122 of 5 January 2012, when the municipalities of Bom Jesus do Galho and Caratinga were also included in the metropolitan belt.

In the early 2010s, under the effects of the financial crisis that began in 2008, there was a significant reduction in steel demand and subsequent production across Brazil, including Vale do Aço. This led to a considerable decline in the local industrial population due to job losses and investment cuts, with direct impacts on the service and commerce sectors due to the industrial crisis. In the early 2020s, despite stabilization and growth in the tertiary sector, the industry contributed less to new job creation.

== Geography ==
The Vale do Aço Metropolitan Region (RMVA) is located in the interior of Minas Gerais, east of the Belo Horizonte Metropolitan Region. The four main municipalities belong to the Intermediate and Immediate Geographic Regions of Ipatinga, according to the IBGE division in effect since 2017. The total area of the metropolitan core is 806.584 km² according to the IBGE, of which 126.38 km² (15.66% of the total) is urban.

=== Topography ===
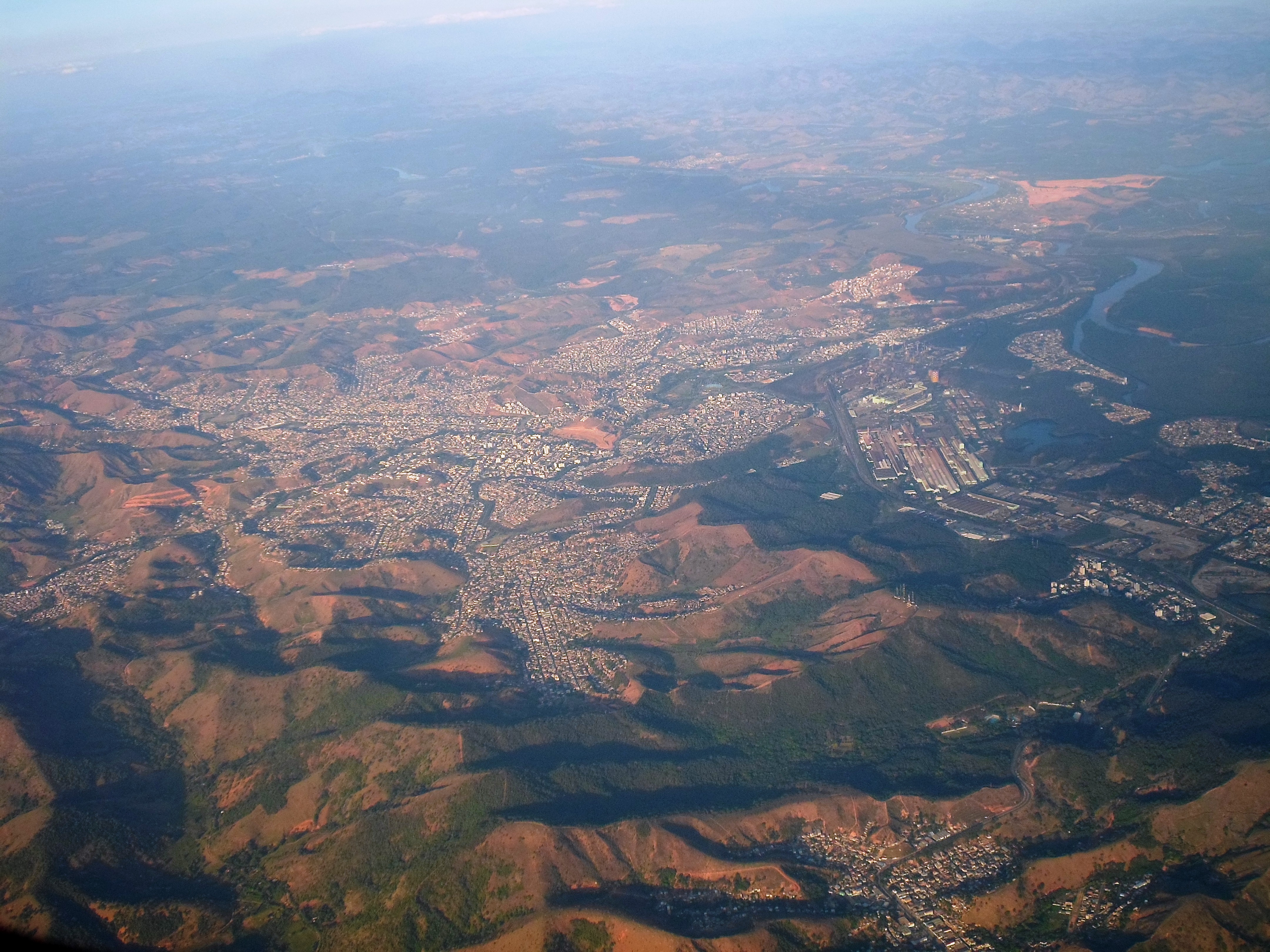
Aerial view of Ipatinga, where the undulating topography can be observed.

Vale do Aço is situated within the interplateau depression of the Vale do Rio Doce, with its topography resulting from fluvial erosion acting on granite-gneiss rocks from the Precambrian period. The region features rocks from the gneissic-magmatic-metamorphic complex, including biotite-gneiss, granitic rocks, and granite-gneiss. As the name suggests, the region has characteristics of a valley, located in a low-lying area surrounded by elevated geological formations. Consequently, the topography is rugged, with its depression characterized by hills with moderate slopes intersected by fluvial plains and natural lakes.

The highest elevations in the metropolitan region are found in the northwest, in the territory of Coronel Fabriciano, where the Serra dos Cocais massifs are located. The average altitude ranges between 500 and 800 meters in this geological unit, which also limits urban expansion due to the terrain's layout. Conversely, the lowest elevations are found along the riverbanks, around which the industrial complexes of Usiminas and Aperam South America were established in Ipatinga and Timóteo, respectively. As a result, there is significant occupation and the emergence of neighborhoods, particularly low-income ones, in areas with steep slopes.

=== Hydrography ===
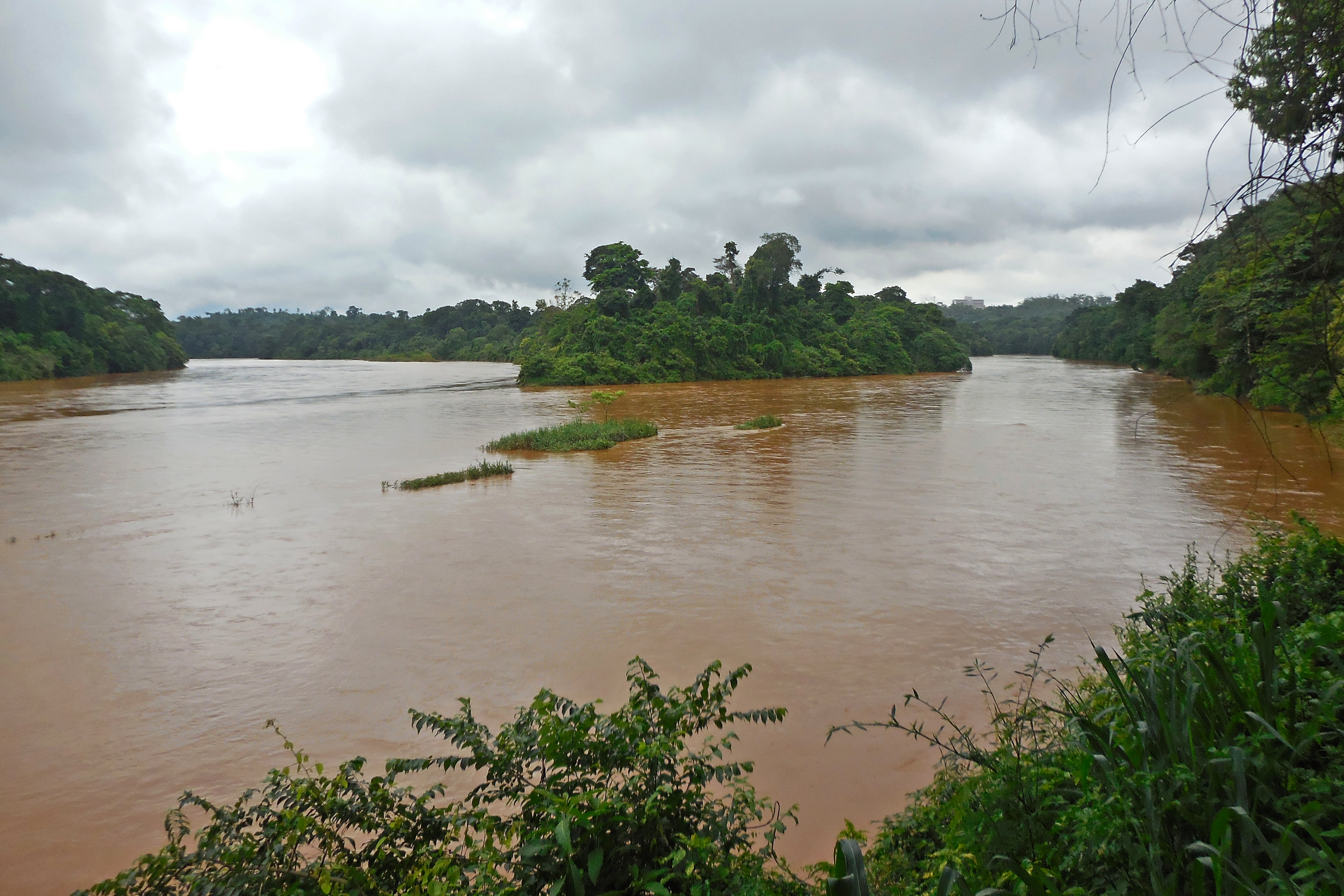
The confluence of the Piracicaba River (right) with the Doce River (left), viewed from the Pedra Mole Station lookout.

The region lies within the Doce River Basin and is almost entirely encompassed by the sub-basin of the Piracicaba River. Underground, beneath where the Piracicaba River flows into the Doce River, lies an alluvial aquifer, from which water is extracted to supply most of Vale do Aço. Water demand is approximately 292 liters per second, and water collection and treatment in the four municipalities are managed by the Minas Gerais Sanitation Company (Copasa). Surface water availability is higher in the southern part. While other areas have a maximum capacity of 0.008 to one liter per second, the southern region, closer to the Piracicaba and Doce rivers, averages up to 10,000 liters per second.

Overall, the metropolitan region encompasses thirteen sub-basins, including: the Bueiro and Entre Folhas streams and the Achado and Garrafa rivers in Santana do Paraíso; the Ipanema River in Ipatinga; the Caladão, Caladinho, and Cocais Pequeno rivers in Coronel Fabriciano; and the Atalho, Celeste, and Limoeiro streams and the Belém and Timotinho rivers in Timóteo. Particularly along the banks of the Caladão (Coronel Fabriciano) and Timotinho (Timóteo) rivers, watercourses guided the expansion of the urban perimeter in these municipalities, as the first subdivisions were located around these microbasins. Flooding issues are common due to the morphometric characteristics and unplanned occupation.

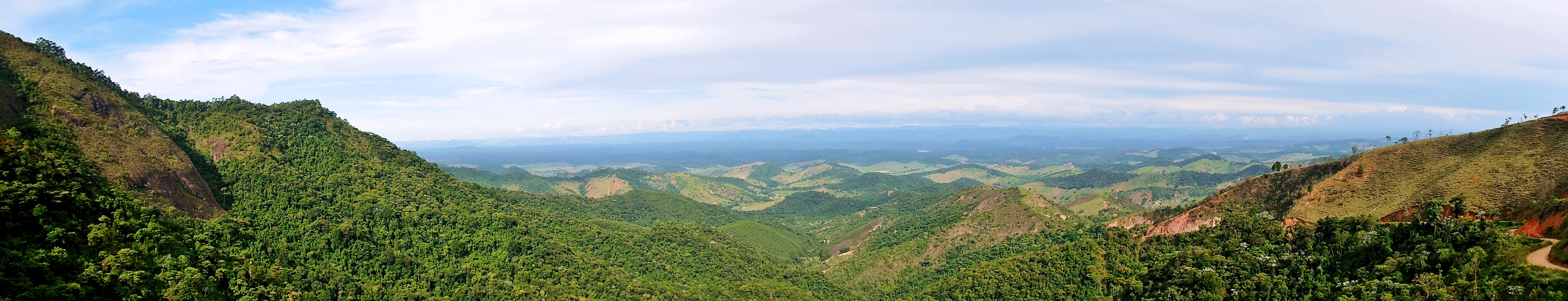
Undulating topography in the APA of Jacroá, in Marliéria.

=== Climate ===
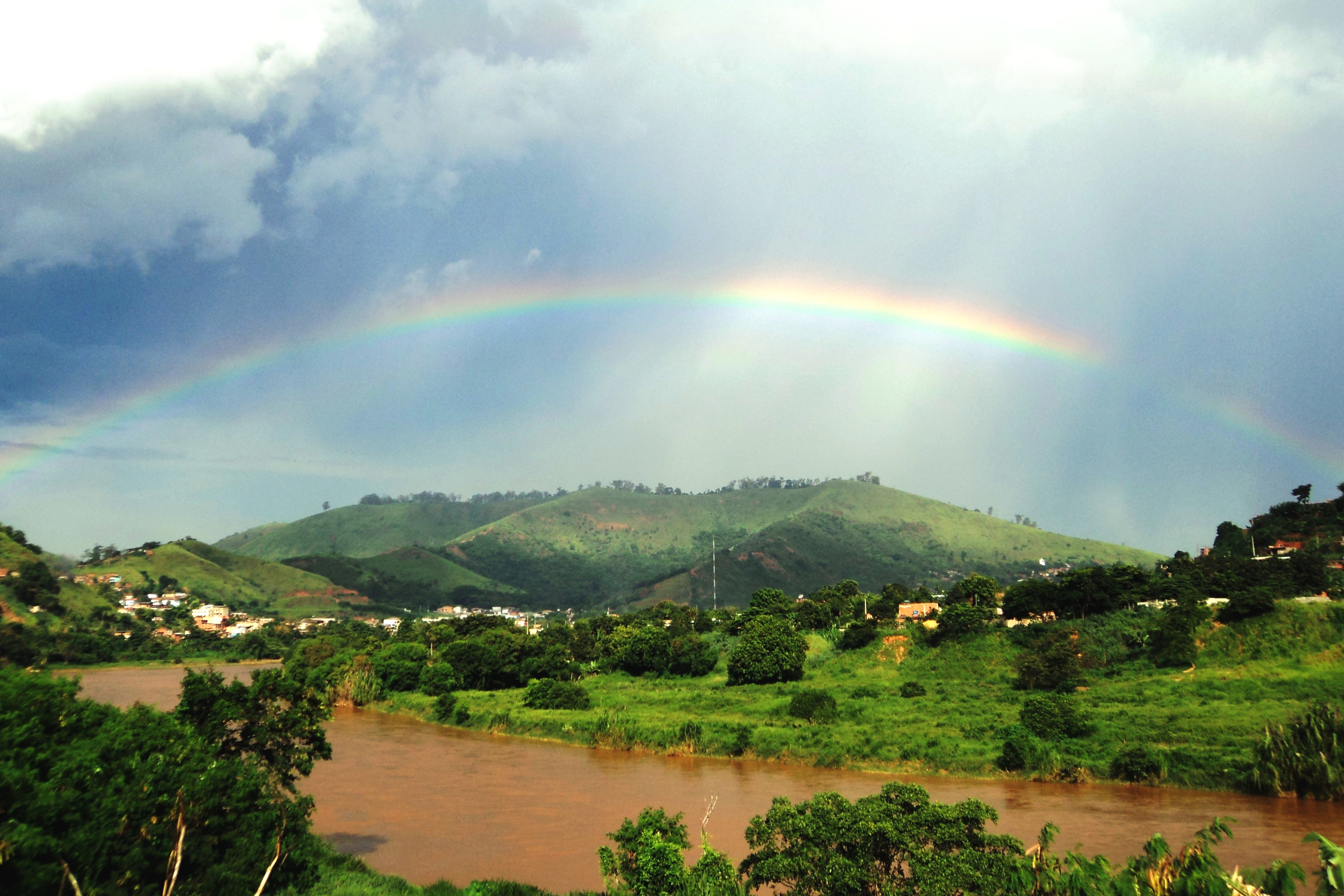
A rainbow over the Piracicaba River between Coronel Fabriciano and Timóteo.

The local climate is classified as tropical wet and dry (type Aw according to the Köppen classification). Based on Coronel Fabriciano, the average annual temperature is 23 °C, and the average annual rainfall is 1,415 mm/year, concentrated between October and April. The wet season encompasses the hotter months, while the dry season covers the milder months. Autumn and spring are transitional seasons. The transition between the dry and wet seasons is marked by thunderstorms and high thermal amplitude, particularly between the end of winter and spring.

The relative humidity is relatively high, with an annual average of about 80%, though low humidity levels can occur during the dry season or prolonged Indian summers. During these periods, dry air combined with pollution promotes the concentration of pollutants in the atmosphere, worsening air quality. Fog occurs when high humidity combines with low temperatures, although the proximity to bodies of water and the valley topography prevent temperatures from dropping excessively. However, stronger air masses can cause temperatures to approach or, rarely, fall below 0 °C in rural areas. Conversely, the hottest days of the year can reach temperatures near or above 40 °C in urban areas, with a record of 42.6 °C in Ipatinga, according to Usiminas, on 31 October 2012.

=== Ecology and environment ===
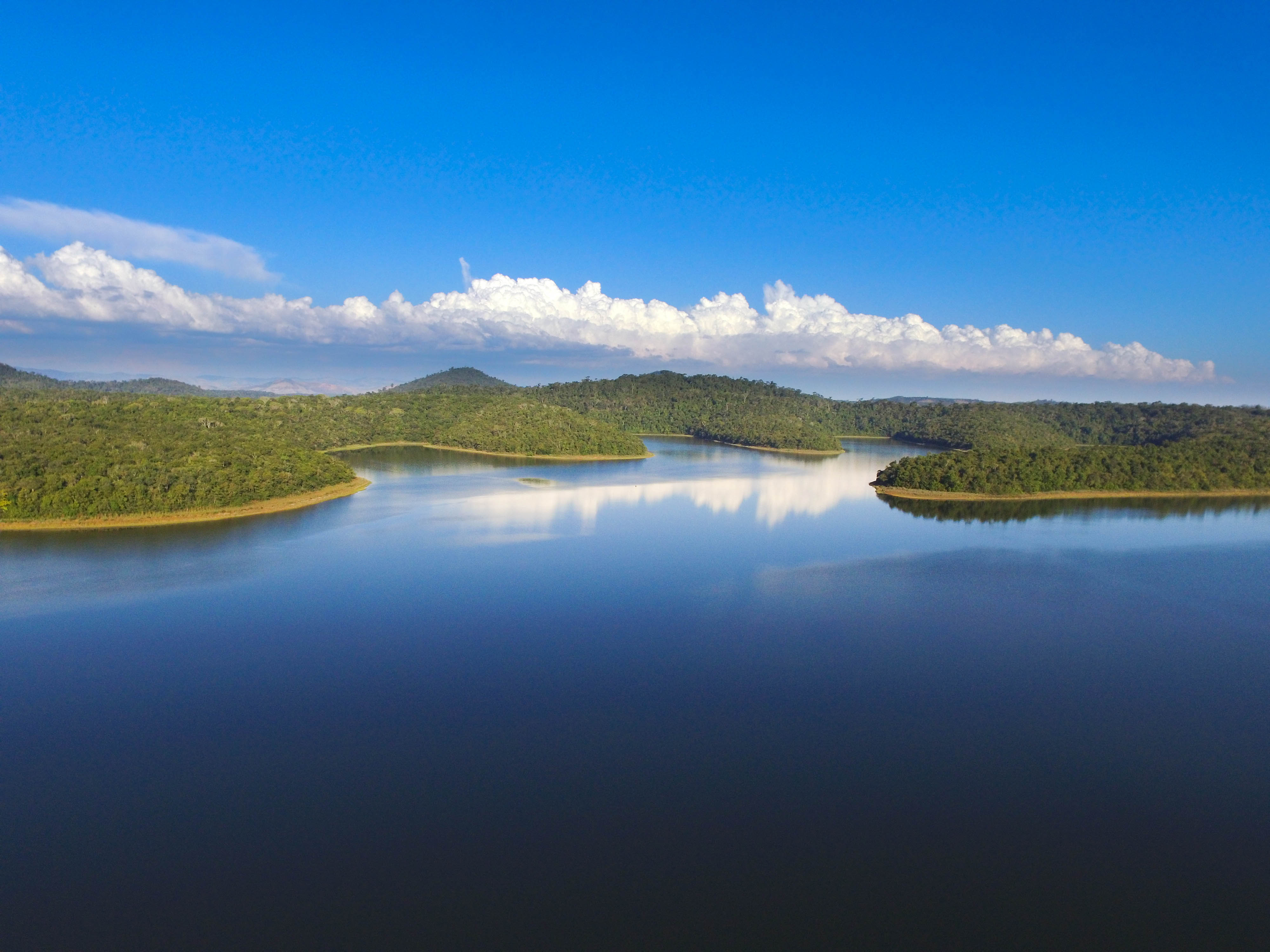
Dom Helvécio Lake within the Rio Doce State Park

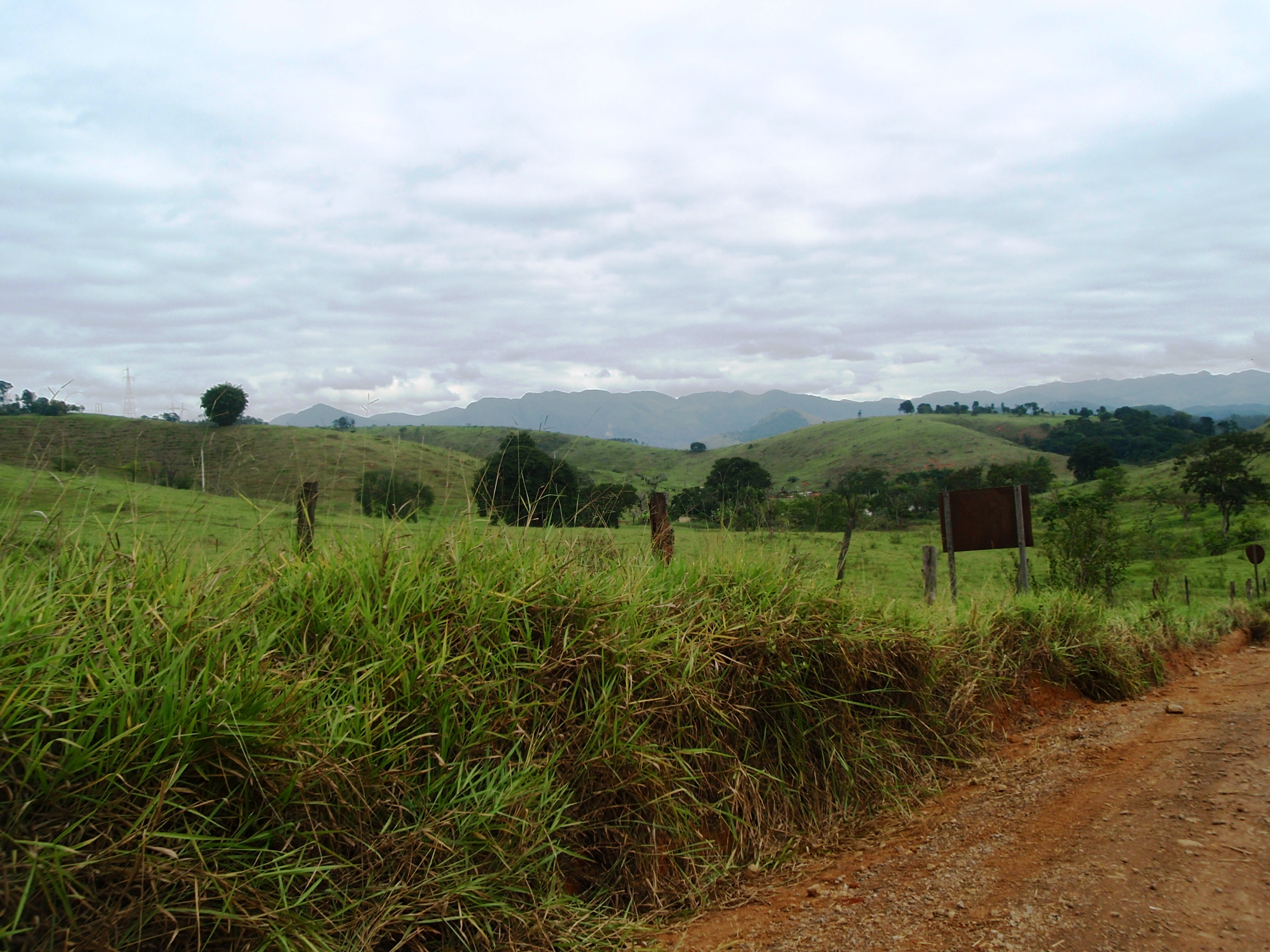
Pasture area in Santana do Paraíso

The native vegetation belongs to the Atlantic Forest domain, with few fragmented areas remaining amid reforestation, pastures, and urban areas. The municipality of Timóteo serves as the gateway to the Rio Doce State Park, the largest remnant of Atlantic Forest and one of the main lake systems in the state, hosting significant biodiversity. In 2014, 15 of the 28 municipalities in Vale do Aço and its metropolitan belt had environmental protection areas (APAs), in addition to seven municipal parks and nine private natural heritage reserves (RPPNs). It is estimated that 16% of the species recorded in the RMVA are endemic to the Atlantic Forest. However, most APA areas are used for pastures or eucalyptus cultivation.

There is also significant monoculture reforestation with eucalyptus for the production of raw materials for the pulp mill of Cenibra and the production of charcoal for local steel industries. In rural areas, particularly in Coronel Fabriciano, Ipatinga, and Santana do Paraíso, as well as several municipalities in the Vale do Rio Doce, Cenibra began paying small producers to cultivate eucalyptus on their properties for pulp production in Belo Oriente, replacing their subsistence crops, where economic activities previously centered around agriculture and coffee plantations, now shifting to vegetal extraction.

Areas with Atlantic Forest coverage in the RMVA municipalities
Municipality	Municipal area (km²)	Atlantic Forest (km²)	Percentage
Coronel Fabriciano	221.252	7.88	9.05%
Ipatinga	164.884	6.0	6.89%
Santana do Paraíso	276.067	10.22	11.74%
Timóteo	144.381	116.17	80.46%
RMVA	806.584	140.27	17.39%

== Demography ==
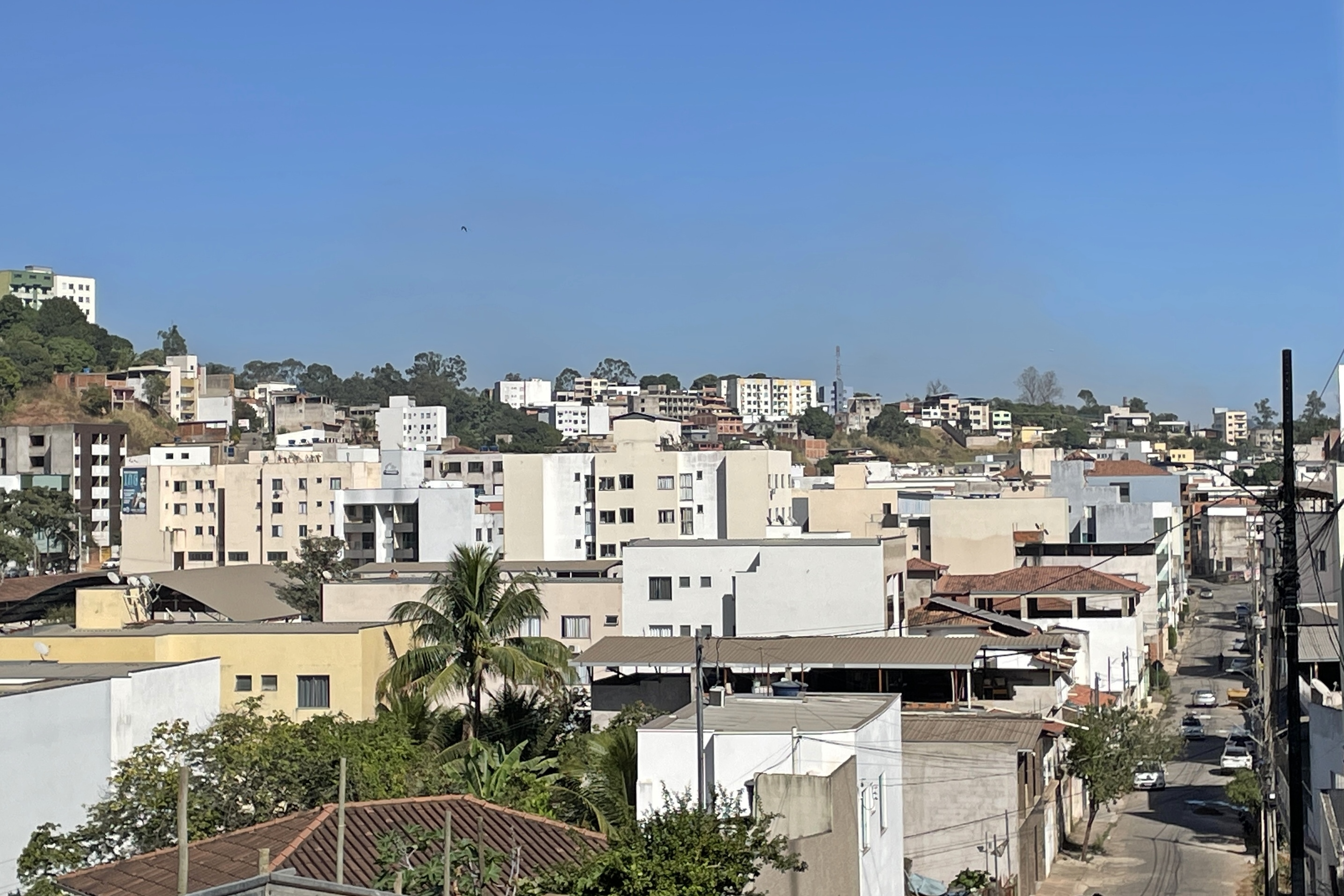
The Cidade Nova neighborhood in Santana do Paraíso, which is in conurbation with Ipatinga.

In 2022, the population of the four municipalities of the Vale do Aço Metropolitan Region was estimated at 458,846 inhabitants, according to the census conducted by the Brazilian Institute of Geography and Statistics (IBGE). Ipatinga was the most populous municipality, with 227,731 inhabitants, followed by Coronel Fabriciano with 104,736 inhabitants, Timóteo with 81,579 inhabitants, and Santana do Paraíso with 44,800 inhabitants. According to the 2010 census, the population of the four RMVA municipalities was 451,351 inhabitants. Also in 2010, the population of the 24 municipalities in the metropolitan belt was 264,351 inhabitants, totaling 715,702 residents in Vale do Aço when including adjacent cities. Among the belt municipalities, Caratinga was the most populous with 85,322 inhabitants, while Jaguaraçu was the least populated with 2,982 residents.

Santana do Paraíso is the municipality that has shown the highest growth rates over the past two decades, as it is the only one with large areas still suitable for real estate investments while being close to the Center of Ipatinga and the Usiminas complex. From 2000 to 2010, the average annual population growth rate in Santana do Paraíso was 4.15%, while Ipatinga had an average rate of 1.20%, Timóteo 1.29%, and Coronel Fabriciano 0.62%. Notably, 24.8% of Santana do Paraíso’s population in 2010 came from other municipalities. In the metropolitan belt, 14 municipalities experienced population decline during the decade. The proportion of inhabitants living in urban areas exceeds 98% in Coronel Fabriciano, Ipatinga, and Timóteo, while in Santana do Paraíso it is 92.6%, and in the entire metropolitan belt, it remains around 75%.

The average Human Development Index (HDI) of the RMVA was 0.745, according to the United Nations Development Programme (UNDP) in 2010. Ipatinga had the highest value at 0.771, followed by Timóteo at 0.770, Coronel Fabriciano at 0.755, and Santana do Paraíso at 0.685. When including the metropolitan belt, the average HDI of Vale do Aço drops to 0.664, with Caratinga having the highest value among the belt municipalities (0.706) and Açucena the lowest (0.610).

The IBGE considers Vale do Aço a region where the process of metropolization can be observed, as there are interdependent relationships between municipalities that directly influence urban expansion, regional influence, and the attraction of larger cities. In this case, metropolization revolves around Ipatinga, identified as a regional capital within the Brazilian urban hierarchy. A 2019 study by geographer William Passos identifies the Vale do Aço Metropolitan Region as having the most significant metropolization in the interior of the Southeast Region outside of São Paulo.

Largest cities or towns in Vale do Aço Metropolitan Region and surrounding areas (2022 Census by the IBGE)
Rank		Pop.
1	Ipatinga	227,731
2	Coronel Fabriciano	104,736
3	Caratinga	87,360
4	Timóteo	81,579
5	Santana do Paraíso	44,800
6	Belo Oriente	23,928
7	Ipaba	17,136
8	Bom Jesus do Galho	14,537
9	Iapu	12,030
10	Açucena	8,943

== Poverty and inequality ==
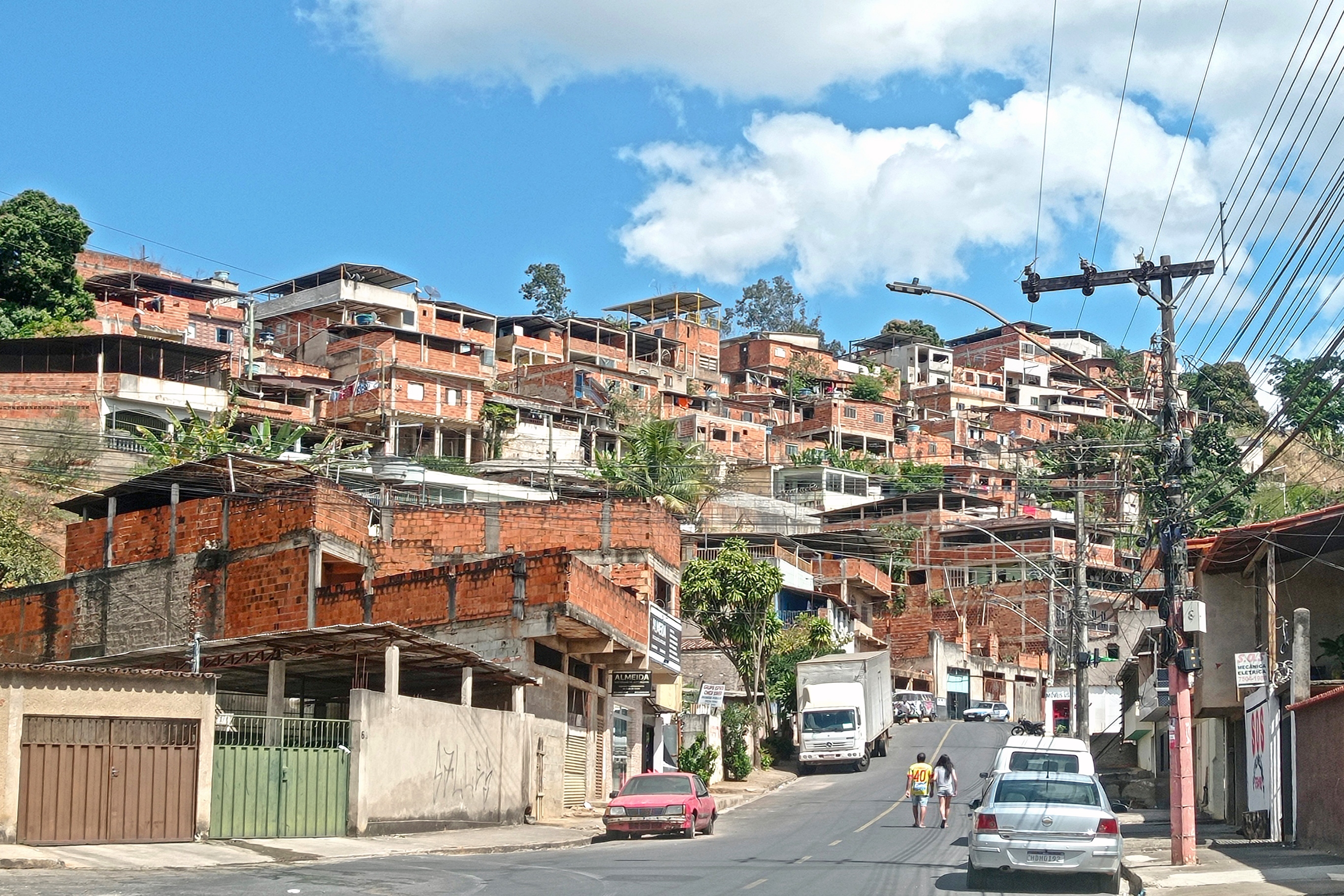
Housing in Morro Padre Rocha, one of the slums of Coronel Fabriciano.

During the establishment of large steel industries in Coronel Fabriciano, the region experienced uncontrolled population growth. In 1964, the municipalities of Ipatinga and Timóteo were separated, incorporating the territories of these industries. Many workers from these companies, however, continued to reside in Coronel Fabriciano, while tax revenues and most social initiatives promoted by the industries were directed to the neighboring cities that hosted them. As a result, Fabriciano faced a shortage of resources and infrastructure to implement the necessary public policies. The urban growth of this municipality, in particular, was not accompanied by economic and social development sufficient to meet the population’s needs.

Consequently, Coronel Fabriciano had the second-highest proportion of residents living in slums among the municipalities of Minas Gerais, with approximately 20% of its population in such conditions in 2022. At the same time, Ipatinga and Timóteo were also among the 15 municipalities in Minas Gerais with the highest percentage of residents in similar situations. Despite the construction of planned housing complexes to accommodate the industrial population in Ipatinga and Timóteo, the presence of slums in these areas, particularly in Timóteo’s territory, stems from uncontrolled land occupation by populations attracted by local progress. The municipalities of Belo Oriente and Bom Jesus do Galho also had slums, according to IBGE data from 2022.

== Religion ==
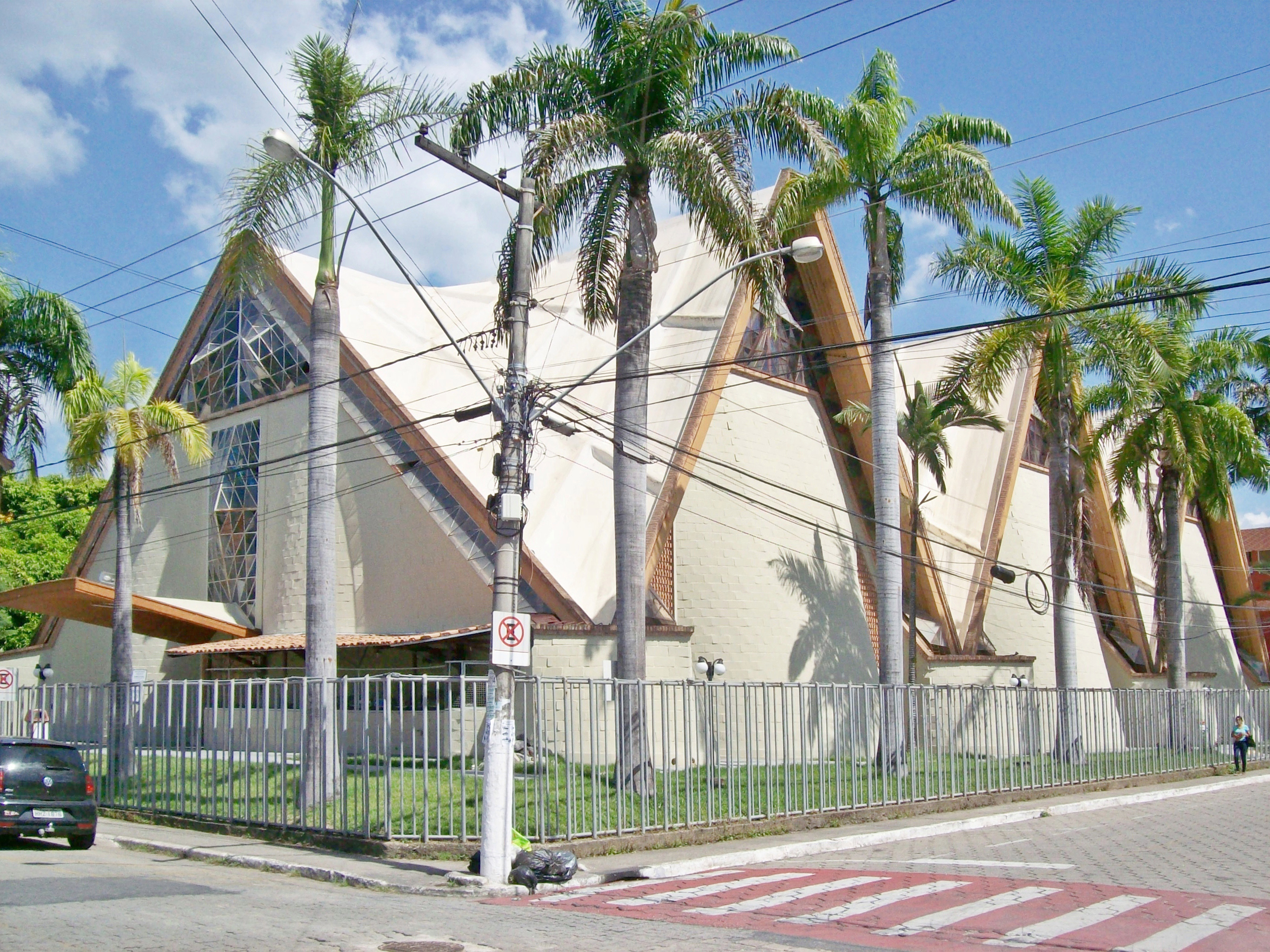
The Saint Sebastian Cathedral in Coronel Fabriciano is the co-seat of the Diocese of Itabira-Fabriciano.

The St. John the Baptist Cathedral, the episcopal seat of the Diocese of Caratinga.

Those identifying as Catholics remain the majority in the municipalities of the Vale do Aço; however, Ipatinga, Timóteo, and Santana do Paraíso have the highest percentages of Protestants in Minas Gerais, with rates of 40.02%, 40.9%, and 42.6%, respectively, according to the 2010 IBGE demographic census. In that year, the population of the RMVA was predominantly composed of Catholics (48%), Protestants (41%), individuals without religion (10%), and Spiritists (1%). Ipaba and Belo Oriente are also among the areas with the lowest presence of Catholics in the state.

The municipality of Coronel Fabriciano has been a co-seat of the Diocese of Itabira-Fabriciano since 1979, alongside the episcopal seat of Itabira. The city also serves as the seat of the so-called Pastoral Region III of the diocese, which comprises a total of 23 parishes across nine municipalities, including the four municipalities of the RMVA. Thus, in the metropolitan core, three parishes are based in Coronel Fabriciano, ten in Ipatinga, three in Timóteo, and one in Santana do Paraíso. In the metropolitan belt, seven other municipalities have parishes and/or communities under the Diocese of Itabira-Fabriciano, while eleven are part of the Diocese of Caratinga (with Caratinga as the episcopal seat), four are part of the Diocese of Governador Valadares, and two are part of the Diocese of Guanhães.

== Composition and administration ==
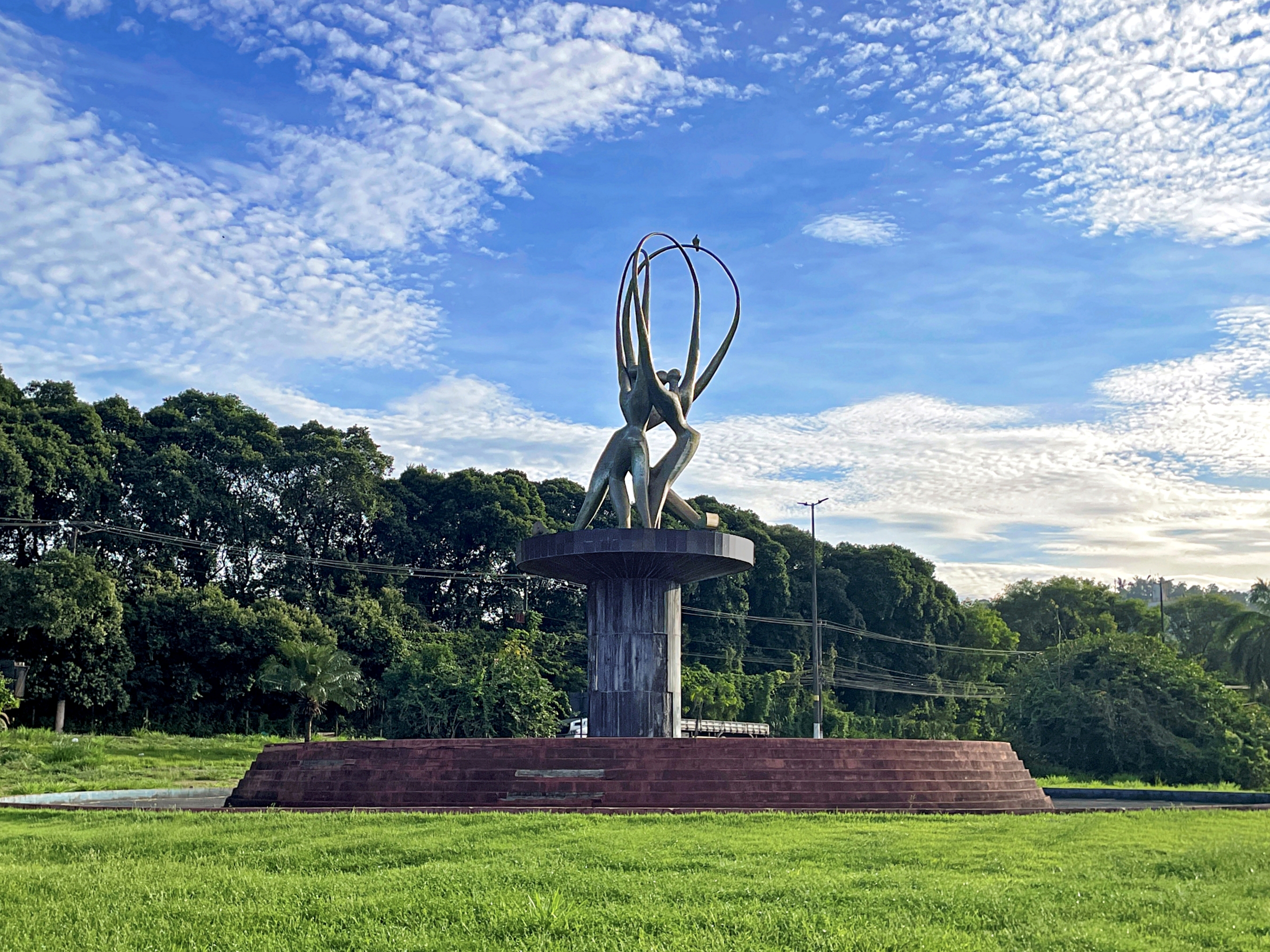
The Sinergia Monument, installed in Timóteo in 1997, symbolizes the municipal administrations of the three main cities of the Vale do Aço.

The Vale do Aço Metropolitan Region (RMVA), established on 30 December 1998 and officially designated as a metropolitan region on 12 January 2006, consists of four main municipalities (Coronel Fabriciano, Ipatinga, Santana do Paraíso, and Timóteo) in addition to the 24 cities located in its metropolitan belt. Subordinate to the municipalities are the districts, with 16 municipalities divided into districts (the remaining 12 consist of only one district, the so-called seat district).

Unlike most metropolitan regions in Brazil, the nomenclature of Vale do Aço does not refer to a central city but rather to its geographic location and main economic activity. According to Articles 182 and 183 of the Brazilian Federal Constitution, the creation of a metropolitan region in the country is possible where there is urban conurbation and strong integration and commuting for work or school among the cities. The Minas Gerais State Constitution stipulates that for the maintenance of a metropolitan region in the state, there must be a Metropolitan Assembly, a Deliberative Development Council, a Development Agency with a technical and executive role, an Integrated Development Master Plan, and a Metropolitan Development Fund.

The Vale do Aço Metropolitan Agency (ARMVA), which handles urban planning, advisory services, regulation, and the facilitation of integrated development instruments, is headquartered in Ipatinga and was established in 2012. It is linked to the State Secretariat for Regional Development, Urban Policy, and Metropolitan Management (SEDRU), as is the case with the Belo Horizonte Metropolitan Region (RMBH). The Development Agency (comprising representatives from municipal and state executive branches, the ALMG, and civil society), the Metropolitan Development Fund (mayors, municipal secretaries, municipal attorneys, and ALMG representatives), and the Deliberative Development Council (managers and ARMVA) also exist, as mandated by the state’s Constitutional Charter.

The Integrated Development Master Plan (PDDI), in turn, was initiated in June 2013 by a technical team from the Catholic University Center of Eastern Minas Gerais (Unileste) and consists of macro-zoning of the Vale do Aço and its metropolitan belt, aiming at proposals for institutional development, urban development, environmental protection, and social and economic development. There are also non-governmental organizations that work toward regional policies, such as the Association of Municipalities of the Vale do Aço Microregion (AMVA), established in 1974, and the Association of Municipalities for Integrated Development (AMDI), founded in 2002, both composed of political representatives from the member cities.

Metropolitan Region

1 / Coronel Fabriciano; 2 / Ipatinga	3 / Santana do Paraíso; 4 / Timóteo

Metropolitan Belt

5	Açucena
6	Antônio Dias
7	Belo Oriente
8	Bom Jesus do Galho
9	Braúnas
10	Bugre
11	Caratinga
12	Córrego Novo

13	Dionísio
14	Dom Cavati
15	Entre Folhas
16	Iapu
17	Ipaba
18	Jaguaraçu
19	Joanésia
20	Marliéria

21	Mesquita
22	Naque
23	Periquito
24	Pingo-d'Água
25	São João do Oriente
26	São José do Goiabal
27	Sobrália
28	Vargem Alegre

== Economy ==
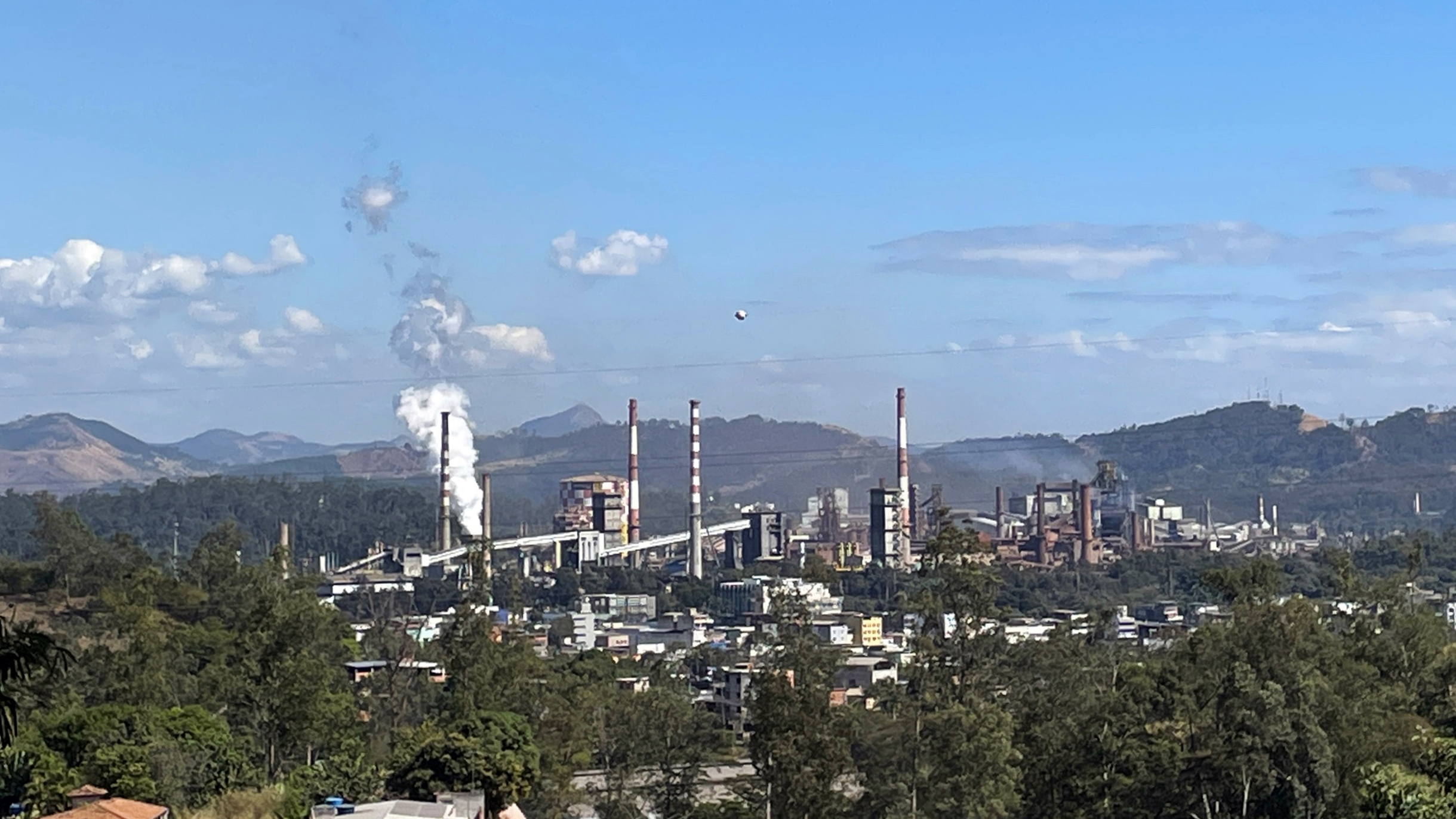
Usiminas factory in Ipatinga, seen from Cidade Nova

The Vale do Aço gained international recognition due to the presence of major companies such as Cenibra (in Belo Oriente), Aperam South America (in Timóteo), and Usiminas (in Ipatinga), all of which export a significant volume of products. As its name suggests, the region stands out for its production of steel, stainless steel, and metalworking products. Since the 1930s, the establishment of industrial complexes in the current RMVA has attracted supplier companies, complementary companies, and service providers to support productive activities. With the establishment of Cenibra, the 1970s also saw a boost in paper and pulp production, leading to the use of vast areas for wood production and exploitation.

The gross domestic product (GDP) of the four RMVA municipalities was R$13,226,864.29 in 2015, equivalent to 2.55% of the GDP of Minas Gerais, while the per capita GDP was R$27,223.95. According to 2011 data, 50.9% of the GDP came from industry, 48.9% from services, and 0.2% from agriculture. Commerce is more prominent in the Centro area of Coronel Fabriciano and in Ipatinga, whose Centro also has significant commercial activity, particularly along Avenida 28 de Abril. The Shopping Vale do Aço, located in Ipatinga, is considered one of the largest shopping centers in the interior of Minas Gerais. Agriculture, meanwhile, retains some relevance in municipalities located in the metropolitan belt.

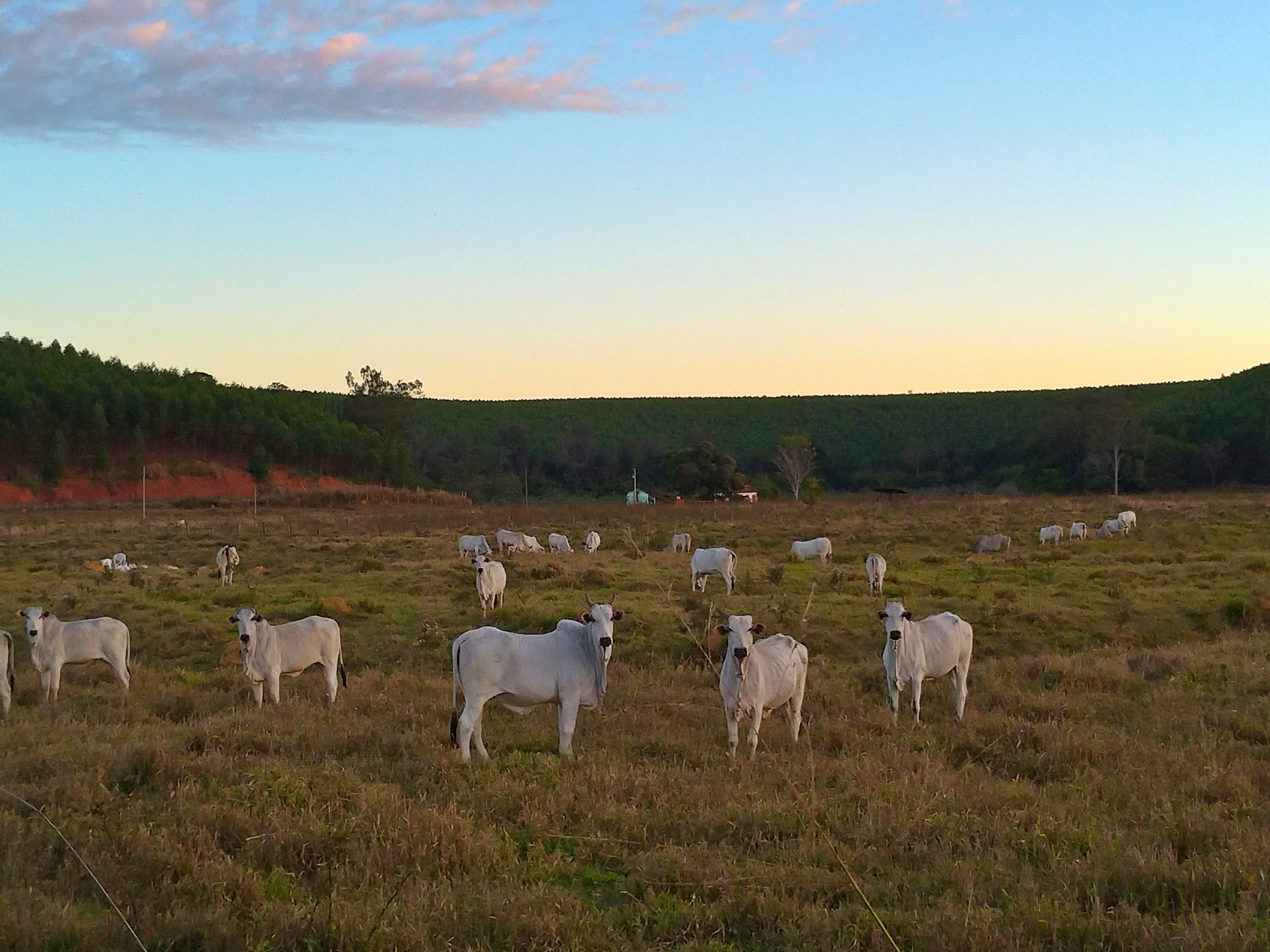
Cattle in Bom Jesus do Galho

In the early 2010s, a decline in demand for steel in both national and international markets led to layoffs and cuts in investments and wages by local industries. In Ipatinga alone, 7,879 industrial jobs were eliminated between 2011 and 2013. Across the four RMVA municipalities, 3,616 industrial jobs were lost in 2013, directly impacting the local commercial and service sectors. In Ipatinga, a total of 10,871 layoffs across all sectors were recorded between January and March 2015, with the majority (3,782) in construction. By December 2015, 25% of the commissioned positions in the Ipatinga city administration had been suspended.

Ipatinga, home to Usiminas, has the highest GDP in the RMVA, with a value of R$8,153,170, followed by Timóteo, home to Aperam, with R$2,145,153, according to IBGE data from 2013. These cities grew due to the presence of these companies, as did neighboring Coronel Fabriciano, which has the third-highest GDP (R$1,288,346). However, in Coronel Fabriciano, commerce became the main source of municipal revenue, as the steel industries, once located in its territory, were transferred to Ipatinga and Timóteo after their emancipation. The fourth position is held by Santana do Paraíso (R$419,532), which is a target for real estate speculation due to its territory being suitable for urban expansion while being close to the steel industries. In the metropolitan belt, the highest GDP belongs to Caratinga, with R$1,079,068, driven by coffee cultivation and commerce. The second-highest GDP in the belt belongs to Belo Oriente (R$983,796), home to Cenibra.

== Infrastructure ==
=== Healthcare ===
Unit 1 of the Márcio Cunha Hospital in Ipatinga.

The RMVA has a Human Development Index (HDI) for longevity above the state and national averages in all four municipalities of the metropolitan core, as is the case with life expectancy at birth in three of the four municipalities. Only Timóteo, with a life expectancy of 75.14 years, is below the state average (75.3 years), though still above the national average (73 years); Coronel Fabriciano and Ipatinga have a life expectancy at birth of 76.8 years, and Santana do Paraíso has 77.6 years. In the metropolitan belt, however, 16 municipalities have an HDI for longevity below the state average.

Regarding the number of children per woman, the average for Coronel Fabriciano and Santana do Paraíso (1.9 in both) is higher than the state (1.7) and national (1.8) averages, while the rates for Ipatinga (1.6) and Timóteo (1.5) are lower than both. In 2012, infant mortality rates ranged from 4.3 deaths of live births in their first year in Santana do Paraíso to 12.9 deaths in Coronel Fabriciano. The Márcio Cunha Hospital in Ipatinga and the Timóteo Hospital and Maternity (formerly Hospital Acesita and Vital Brazil Hospital and Maternity) are considered regional references for high-risk deliveries; however, there are no health centers in the Vale do Aço specialized in high-risk pregnancy care.

With approximately 240 health facilities and 900 hospital beds, the metropolitan core also has a number of hospital beds per thousand inhabitants below the national average in all four municipalities, ranging from 0.64 in Coronel Fabriciano to 2.2 in Ipatinga, compared to the national average of 2.25, according to DATASUS in 2014. The Márcio Cunha Hospital, managed by the São Francisco Xavier Foundation (FSFX), an Usiminas agency, is also a reference for high-complexity services such as oncology and hemodialysis. The Unimed Vale do Aço Metropolitan Hospital, located in Coronel Fabriciano and operational since November 2015, is the main facility of the Unimed network in the region.

=== Education ===
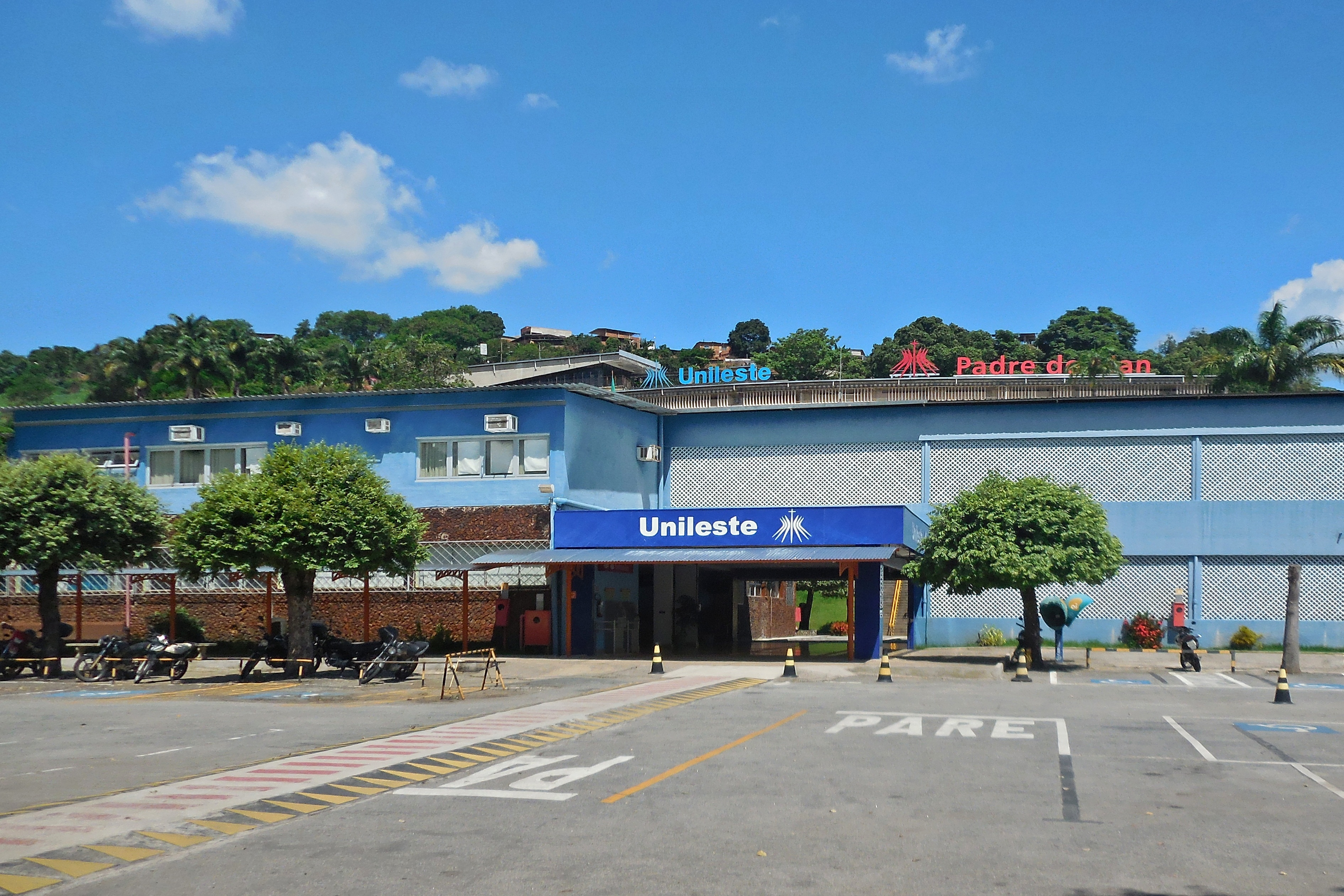
Main campus of Unileste in Coronel Fabriciano.

The average Human Development Index (HDI) for education in the RMVA municipalities is 0.673, according to the PNUD in 2010, which is above the state and national averages and classified as "high" in three of the four municipalities. The exception is Santana do Paraíso, where the education HDI is considered "medium". In 2012, there were a total of 365 schools and, in 2010, 97.9% of children in the metropolitan core aged between six and 14 were enrolled, a figure above the national and state averages of 96.7% and 97.54%, respectively. This also applies when considering the metropolitan belt. In 2010, 67.81% of students aged six to 14 were attending primary education at the recommended age, and 72.84% of adolescents aged 15 to 17 were in secondary education without age distortion. The high school completion rate among youths aged 18 to 20 was 44.9%, and functional illiteracy affected 6.2% of individuals aged 15 or older.

7.6% of students in the RMVA attend school in another city, a figure that reaches 27.1% in Santana do Paraíso. In 2013, the metropolitan region had 16 technical education institutions, with three in Timóteo, four in Coronel Fabriciano, and nine in Ipatinga; and 13 higher education institutions, with one in Coronel Fabriciano, one in Santana do Paraíso, two in Timóteo, and the remaining nine in Ipatinga. The Catholic University Center of Eastern Minas Gerais (Unileste), which has a main campus in Coronel Fabriciano and another in Ipatinga, was established in 1969 and represents the largest educational complex in the Vale do Aço and one of the largest in eastern Minas Gerais. In 2010, 14.5% of the metropolitan population was enrolled in higher education, according to the IBGE.

=== Services and communications ===
Water treatment plant of Copasa in Coronel Fabriciano

With a total of 140,451 households, of which 1.35% are located in rural areas, the water supply and sewage collection services in most of the RMVA are provided by the Minas Gerais Sanitation Company (Copasa), with 94.23% of the population of the four main municipalities served by the general water supply network in 1989. The water used to supply most of the four cities in the metropolitan region is sourced from collection points located in the Santa Terezinha neighborhood in Timóteo and Amaro Lanari in Coronel Fabriciano.

Regarding sewage services, there are wastewater treatment plants in the four cities of the metropolitan region. However, in 2010, only Ipatinga was served by the service, through four stations distributed across the municipal territory. In the other three municipalities, sewage was discharged into watercourses without treatment. A wastewater treatment plant began operating in 2019, in the Limoeiro neighborhood of Timóteo, initially intended to serve 165,000 residents of Timóteo and Coronel Fabriciano. In 2024, another plant began operating in Santana do Paraíso, aiming to treat initially 80% of the municipality's effluents.

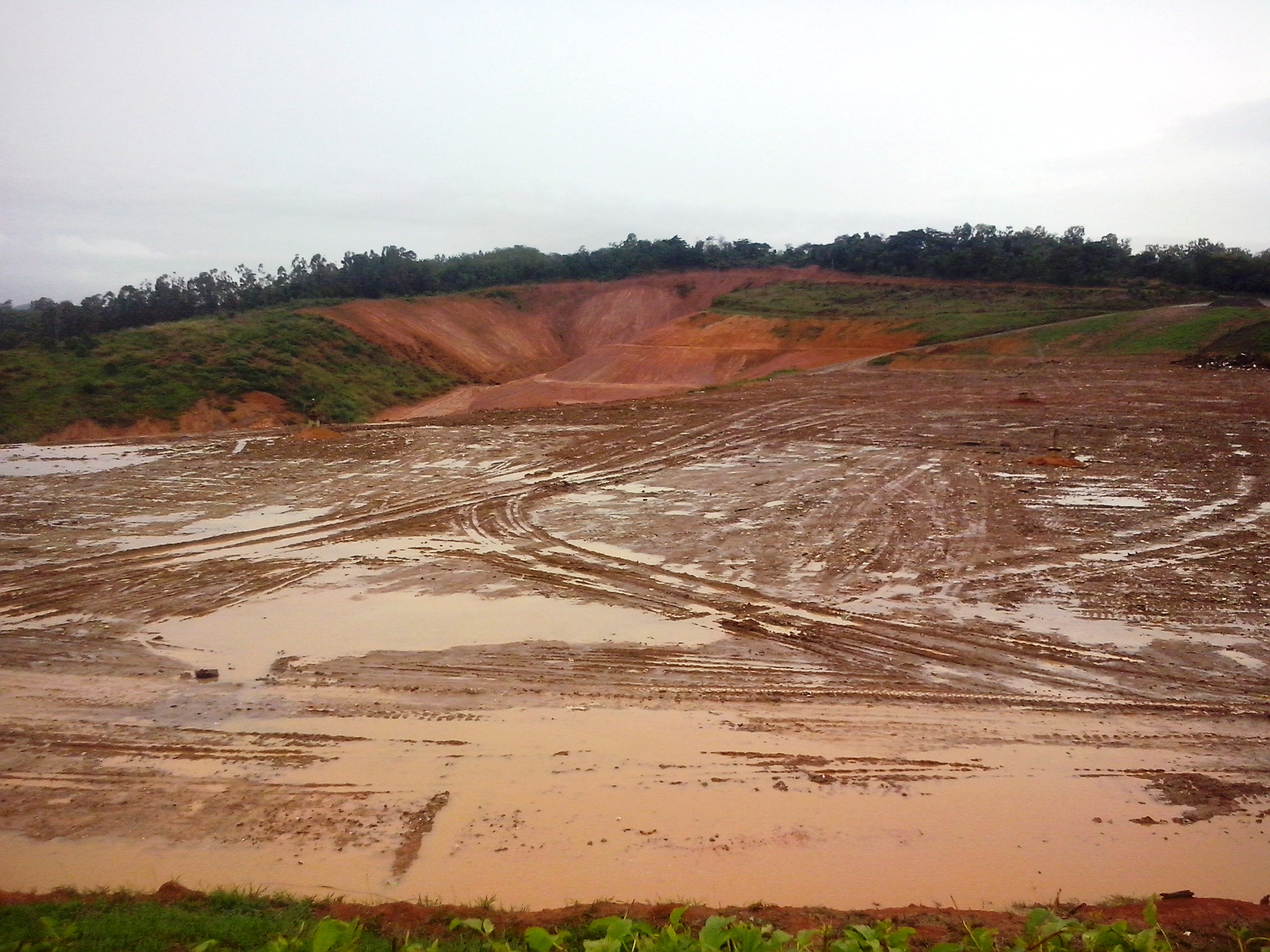
Landfill at the Vale do Aço Waste Treatment Plant (CRVA) in Santana do Paraíso.

As for waste collection, the municipalities of the RMVA use the Vale do Aço Waste Treatment Plant (CRVA), located in Santana do Vale, for waste disposal. Urban cleaning and collection services are managed by the municipal governments and serve approximately 95% of the urban population, although there is also a formal waste recycling collection conducted by waste pickers in some neighborhoods of Coronel Fabriciano and Timóteo and informally in Ipatinga. The supply of electricity, in turn, is provided by the Energy Company of Minas Gerais (Cemig), which serves nearly 100% of the population.

In terms of media, Ipatinga stands out for being home to a branch of InterTV dos Vales, an affiliate of TV Globo. Its coverage reaches almost the entire Vale do Rio Doce and part of the Vale do Mucuri. TV Cultura Vale do Aço, affiliated with TV Cultura and Rede Minas, is also based in Ipatinga and covers parts of the RMVA and its metropolitan belt. Among local daily newspapers, Diário do Aço and Diário Popular stand out. The metropolitan region also has several radio stations, including Líder FM, Jovem Pan FM, Grande Vale FM, Educadora, Galáxia, Itatiaia, Tropical FM, and Vanguarda. According to Praxis Pesquisa, in 2012, approximately 134,680 Ipatinga residents over the age of 16 listened to the radio (74% of this age group). At that time, 95 FM led in audience share with 22% preference.

=== Security and crime ===
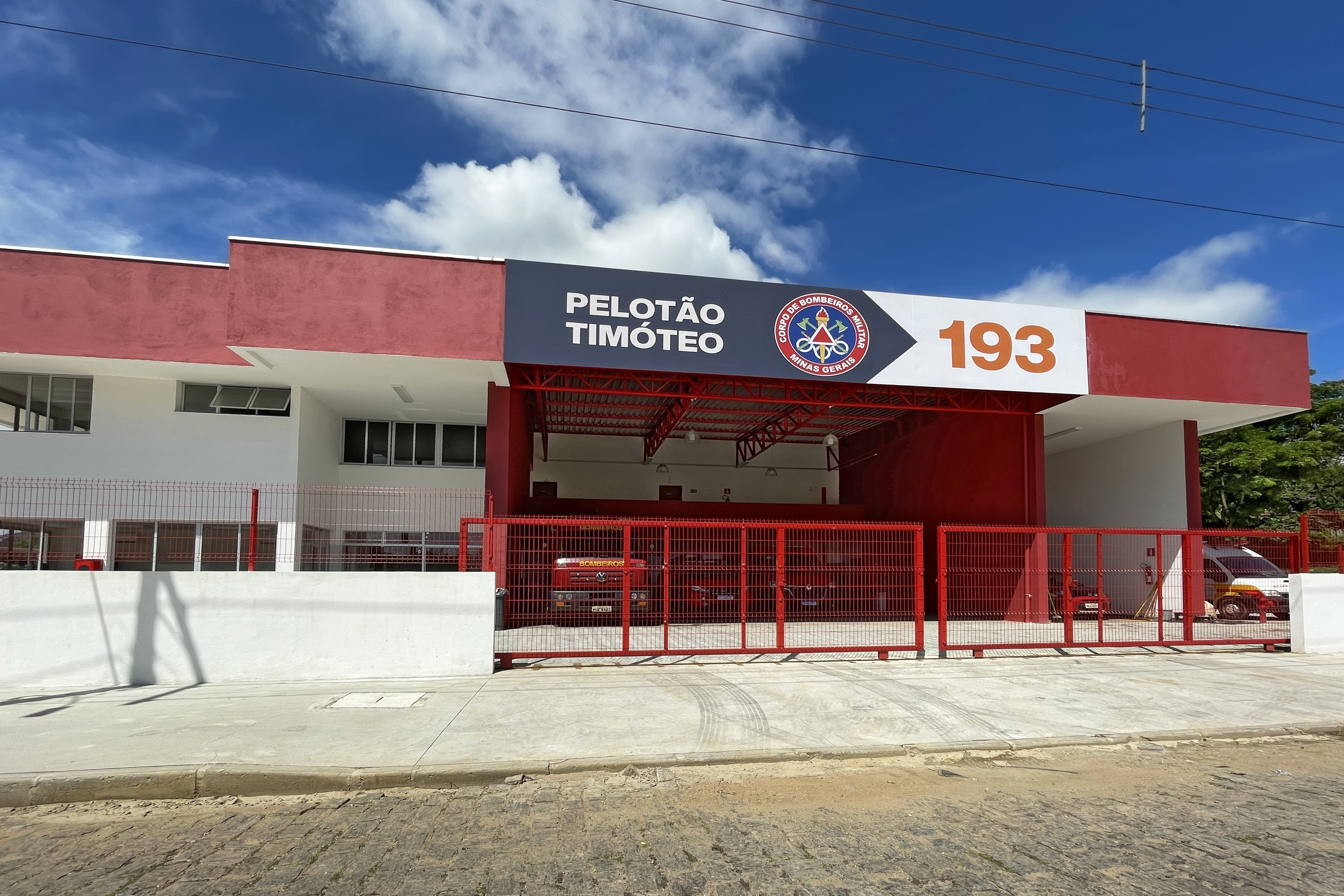
Fire department unit in Timóteo

Public safety in the Metropolitan Region of Vale do Aço is provided by various agencies. The Military Police of Minas Gerais State, a state-level force, is responsible for visible policing in cities, bank patrols, environmental security, prison security, special event security, and social integration initiatives. The metropolitan core is home to Military Police Battalions in Ipatinga and Coronel Fabriciano. On the other hand, the Civil Police aims to combat and investigate crimes and offenses. Ipatinga is home to a battalion of military firefighters that oversees platoons in Ipatinga, Coronel Fabriciano, Timóteo, and Caratinga. Additionally, the civil defense operates under municipal governments.

In 2014, all cities in the metropolitan core recorded homicide rates above the Brazilian average of 25.2 deaths per 100,000 inhabitants in 2013. The rate was highest in Ipatinga, with 28.5 deaths per 100,000 residents. In the Vale do Aço, including its metropolitan belt, 164 homicides were recorded across 15 municipalities in 2014, with 127 occurring in the four main cities. Most homicides are linked to drug trafficking, which also contributes to other crimes, as users often steal to support their addiction. The prison population in the RMVA is housed in facilities in Coronel Fabriciano, Ipatinga (Prisoner Relocation Center-CERESP), Ipaba (Dênio Moreia Penitentiary), and Timóteo, as well as Açucena, which was reopened in 2015 due to overcrowding in the regional and state prison system.

== Transport ==
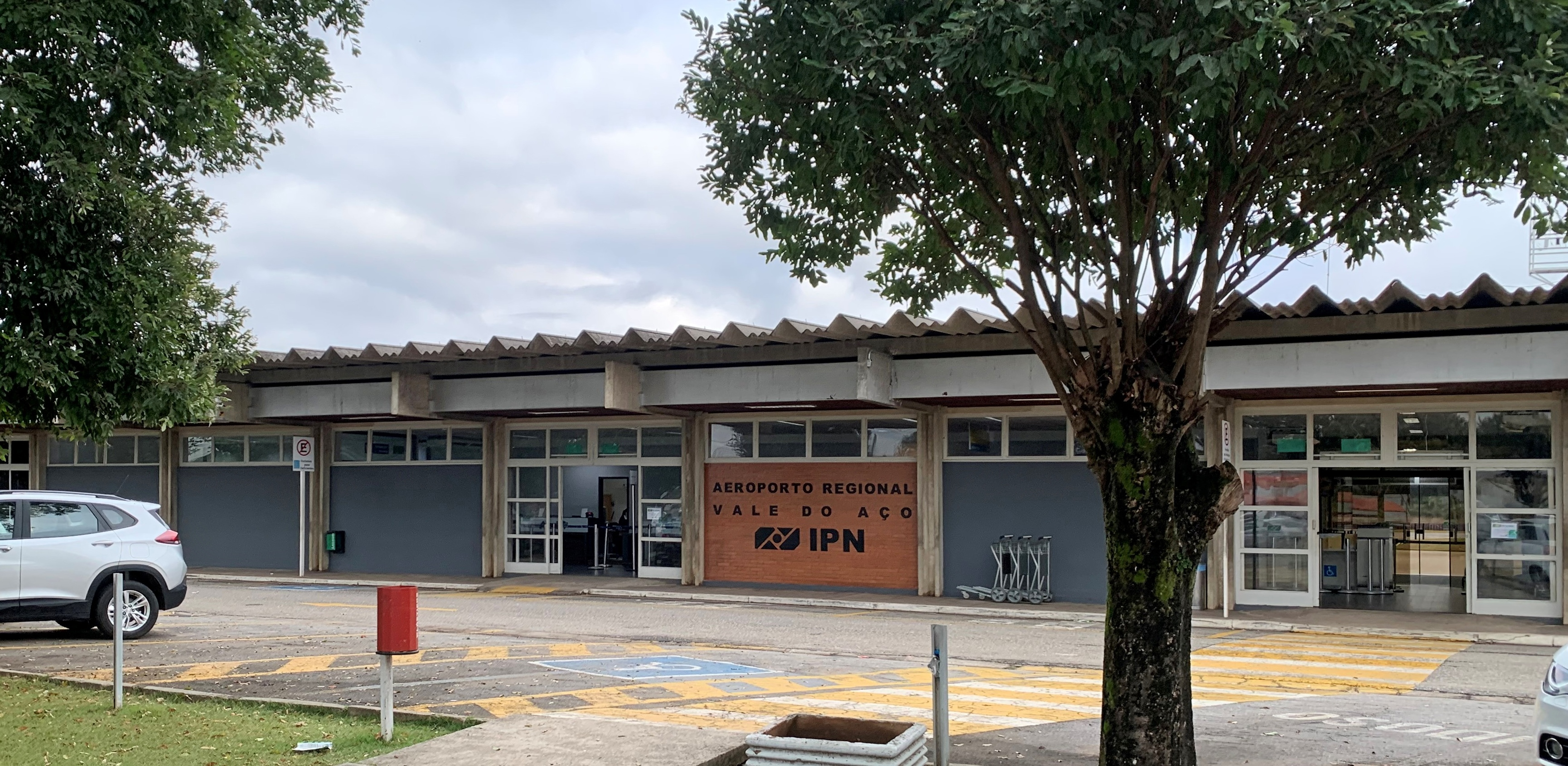
Vale do Aço Regional Airport in Santana do Paraíso

The Vale do Aço Regional Airport, located in Santana do Paraíso, serves the Vale do Aço with daily flights to the Belo Horizonte Metropolitan Region. There are railway stations served daily by trains of the Vitória-Minas Railway (EFVM) in the municipalities of Belo Oriente, Ipaba, Ipatinga (Intendente Câmara Station), Timóteo (Mário Carvalho Station), and Antônio Dias. The construction of the Calado Station, inaugurated in 1924 and deactivated in 1979, was responsible for the emergence of the urban nucleus that corresponds to the current downtown area of Coronel Fabriciano, where the Belgo-Mineira Steel Company complex was established in 1936, bringing infrastructure to the locality and giving rise to industrial activity in the present-day Vale do Aço.

In place of the former Calado Station, the current Coronel Fabriciano Bus Terminal was built, which is the largest passenger terminal in the region. Univale Transportes connects the entire Vale do Aço and part of the metropolitan belt. Saritur is responsible for urban transport in Coronel Fabriciano (alongside Acaiaca) and Ipatinga, also providing intermunicipal lines to the metropolitan region, while in Timóteo, the service is provided by Autotrans — also part of the Saritur group. Access to various cities in Minas Gerais and Brazil is available through nationally significant or local highways, such as BR-116, BR-381, BR-458, BR-474, MG-120, MG-329, MG-425, LMG-758, LMG-759, and LMG-760.

== Culture ==
=== Arts ===
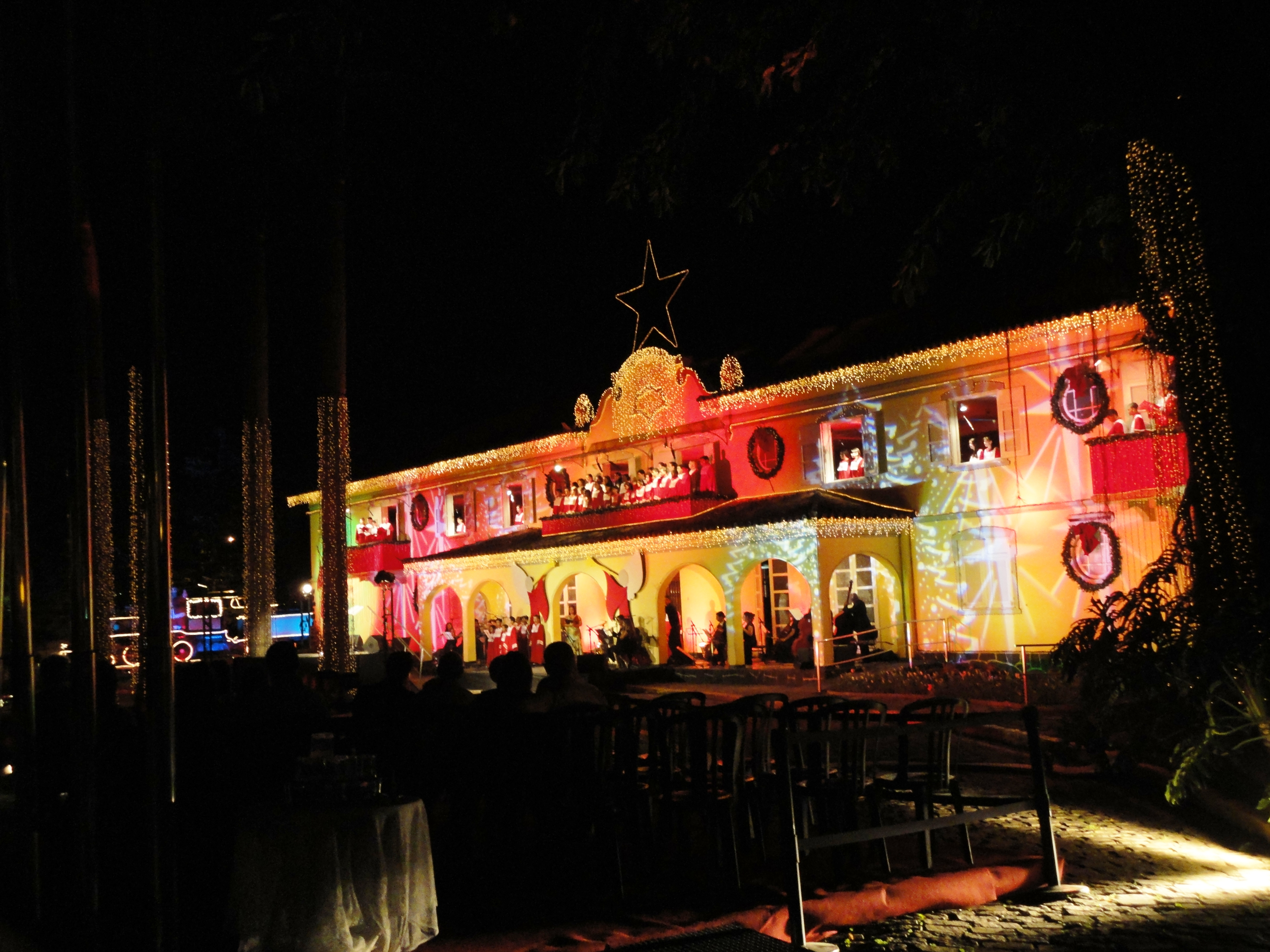
Aperam Acesita Foundation during the institution's Christmas cantata

The RMVA has a range of organizers and cultural spaces that promote the arts in the region, with particular emphasis on those linked to private institutions. This is the case with the Aperam Acesita Foundation Cultural Center, located in Timóteo and affiliated with Aperam South America, which offers the public theatrical performances, workshops, exhibitions, and a museum. Based in Ipatinga, the Usiminas Cultural Center has a regional scope and also provides residents with a diverse program.

Municipal administrations also organize integrated initiatives with the state government and other municipalities and associations to promote local culture and arts. The Catholic University Center of Eastern Minas Gerais (Unileste), through its higher education programs, organizes seminars and other art-related events. In 2012, the State Cultural Incentive Law approved 81 projects from the Vale do Aço municipalities, a region considered, according to members of the commission administering the law, one of the state's major cultural hubs. Among the spontaneous forms of cultural expression in the Vale do Aço, including the metropolitan belt, gastronomy, handicrafts, and congado groups are noteworthy.

=== Landmarks and attractions ===
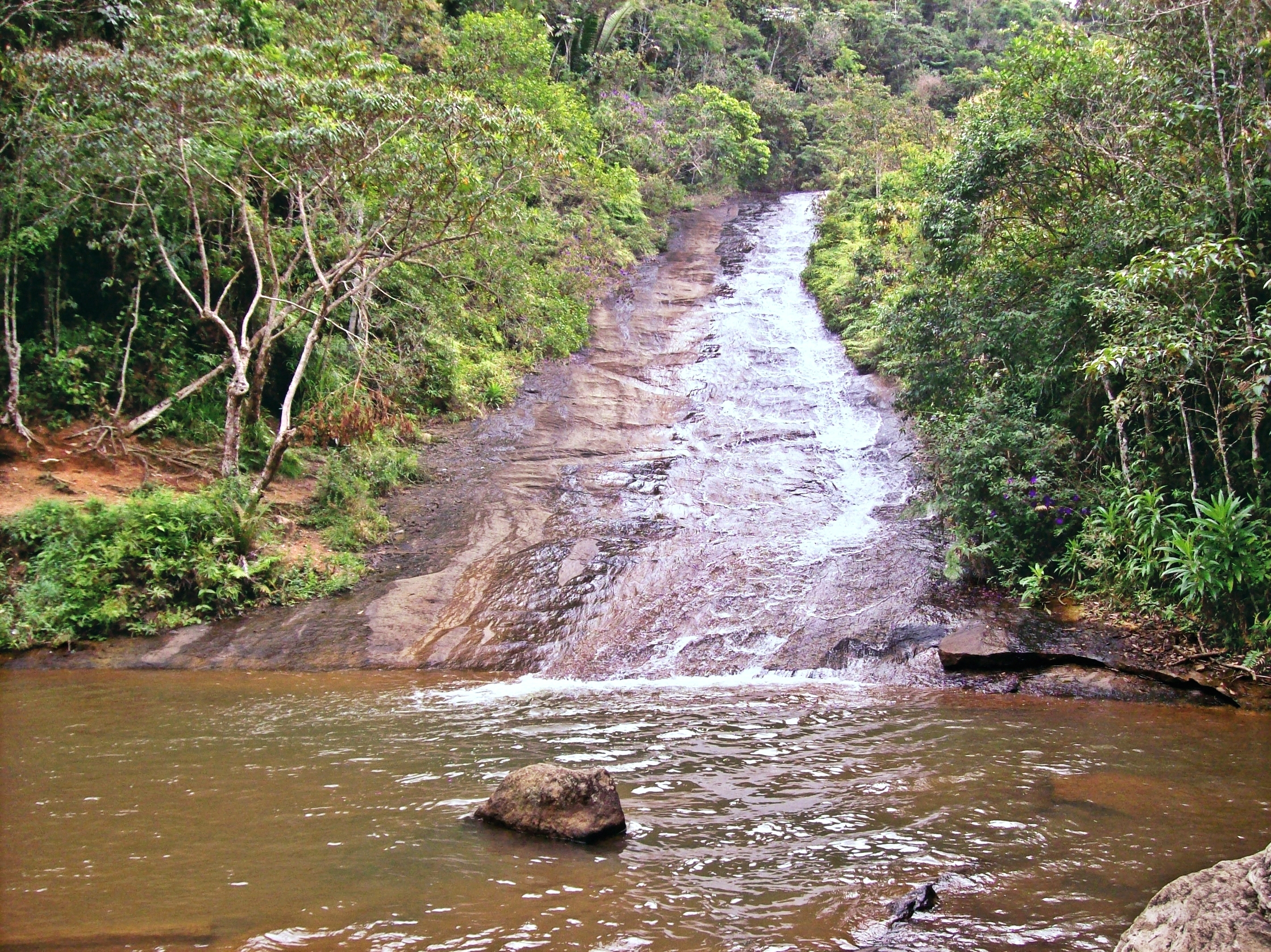
Escorregador Waterfall in the Serra dos Cocais

The four core metropolitan cities, along with some in their metropolitan belt, are part of the Atlantic Forest Tourist Circuit in Minas Gerais, established in July 2001 and restructured in December 2009 by the State Tourism Secretariat to promote ecological and cultural tourism in the Vale do Aço and adjacent areas. These municipalities primarily feature large reserves of Atlantic Forest, with notable attractions including the Serra dos Cocais, the Rio Doce State Park, and the Ana Moura Peak.

The Serra dos Cocais, in the rural area of Coronel Fabriciano, is home to various ecotourism attractions, such as waterfalls, trails, and rock formations, which support activities ranging from visitation to extreme sports such as mountain biking, climbing, trekking, hang gliding, and jeep trails. The Serra da Viúva, in Santana do Paraíso, is also frequently used for hang gliding. Located within this geological formation is the José Paulino dos Santos Hang Gliding Ramp, a reference point for the sport in the region, attracting practitioners from other states and countries. In the rural areas of Ipatinga and Timóteo, there are trails and waterfalls open to visitors.

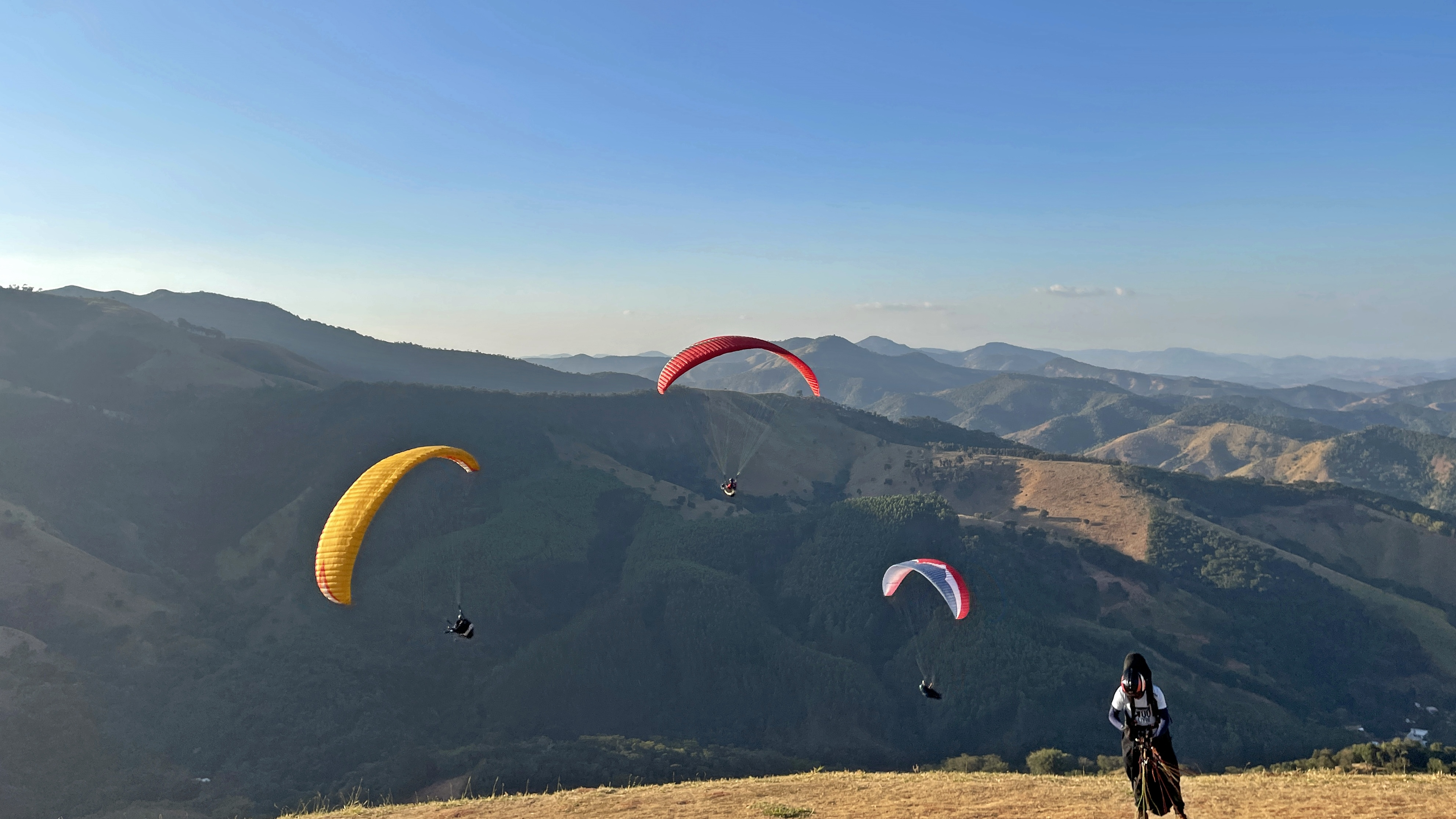
Paragliding jump in the Serra da Viúva, Santana do Paraíso

The metropolitan belt also features attractions and facilities that serve both the metropolitan region and external municipalities. In Caratinga, for example, there are two Private Natural Heritage Reserves (RPPNs), namely the Lagoa Silvana State RPPN and the Feliciano Miguel Abdala Federal RPPN, both open to visitors. The Pedra Itaúna, also in Caratinga, adds scenic value to the city and is used for extreme sports. In the municipality of Pingo-d'Água, the Lagoa Tiririca is a preserved area equipped with chalets, a playground, and a camping site. Between Pingo-d'Água and Marliéria, the Ponte Queimada, of historical and scenic importance, crosses the Doce River at one of the exits of the Rio Doce State Park. In Marliéria, the gateway to the Rio Doce State Park, notable features include waterfalls, hilltop viewpoints, farms, and rural properties. In Ipaba, the RPPN Fazenda Macedônia, maintained by Cenibra, is another conservation unit open to tourism, primarily focused on observing endangered birds. In addition to natural attractions, notable options include rural lodges and farm hotels in the municipalities' rural areas.

The four RMVA municipalities have policies for the preservation and protection of the Municipal Cultural Heritage Council. In urban areas, notable landmarks include the Saint Sebastian Parish Church and the Colégio Angélica in Coronel Fabriciano; the Zeza Souto Memory Station, where Ipatinga's main railway station operated until the 1950s and now houses a museum; and the Santa Ana Parish Church in Santana do Paraíso. The Ipanema Park, in Ipatinga, is one of the largest green areas in the country located within an urban perimeter and was one of the last projects by landscape architect Roberto Burle Marx.

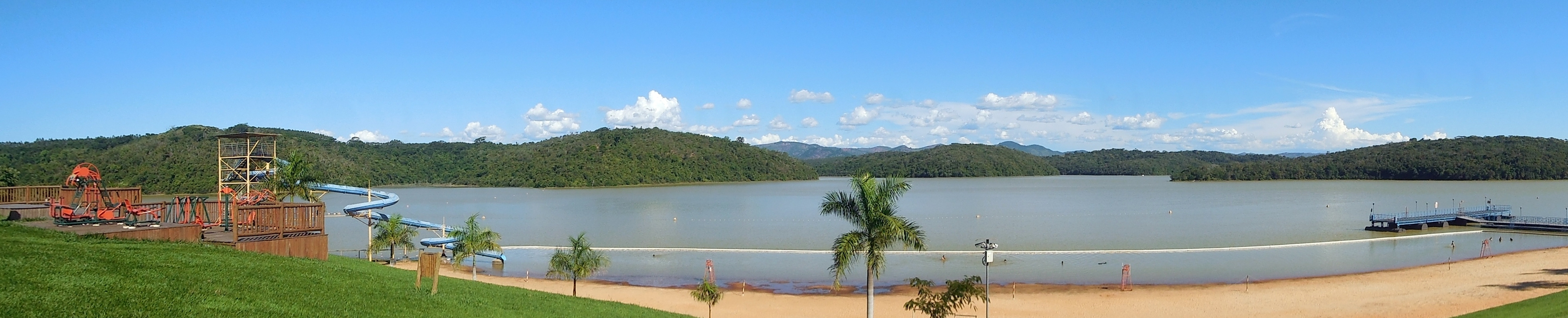
Panoramic view of Lagoa Silvana, in Caratinga.

=== Sports ===
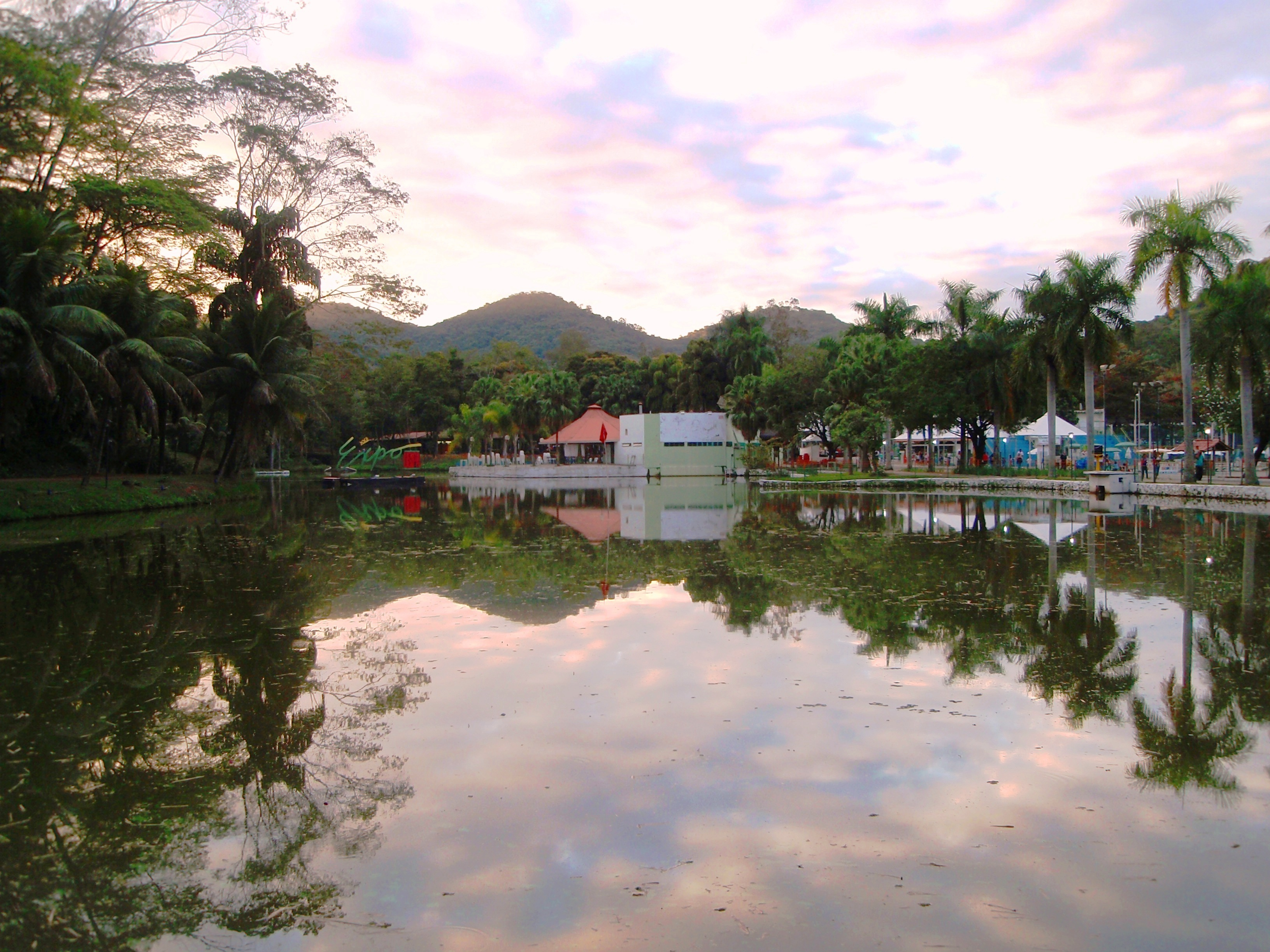
View of Usipa

The Vale do Aço offers a variety of spaces and facilities dedicated to sports activities. The Usipa Sports and Recreational Association stands out, featuring an aquatic park with a heated Olympic-size swimming pool, a football stadium, multi-sport courts, an indoor gymnasium, an athletics track, a zoo, and a children's recreational area. The institution, created by Usiminas, also provides training for specialized sports and football athletes and hosts regional and even national events, such as the Xerimbabo Project (focused on the environment and environmental awareness) and the Expo Usipa (a local business exhibition). The Ipanema Park, also in Ipatinga, the Praça da Estação in Coronel Fabriciano, and the 29 de Abril and 1º de Maio squares in Centro-Sul and Centro-Norte in Timóteo, respectively, are also among the main recreational and event-hosting spaces in the region.

In Ipatinga, the João Lamego Netto Municipal Stadium is the main stadium in the RMVA, with a capacity of up to 23,000 people. Known as Ipatingão, it is considered the "home" of the Ipatinga Futebol Clube, the region's most successful football team, with participation in the top divisions of the Brazilian Championship and the Minas Gerais Championship. Another team from the metropolitan core that achieved prominence is the Social Futebol Clube, from Coronel Fabriciano, which competed in the elite divisions of the Minas Gerais Championship. The Louis Ensch Stadium, owned by Social, is frequently used for important matches in local amateur championships and lower divisions of the state championship.

== Gallery ==
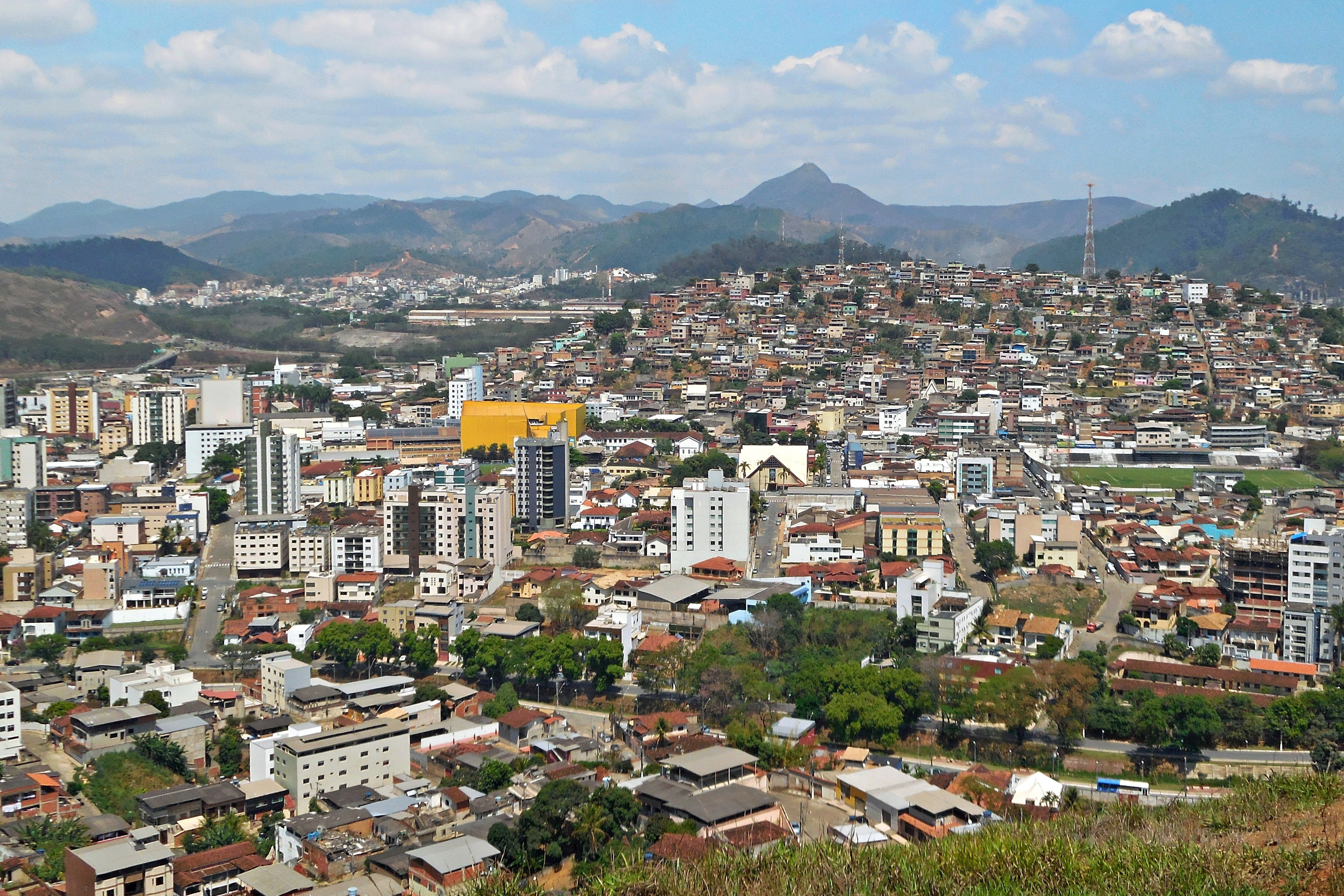
Coronel Fabriciano

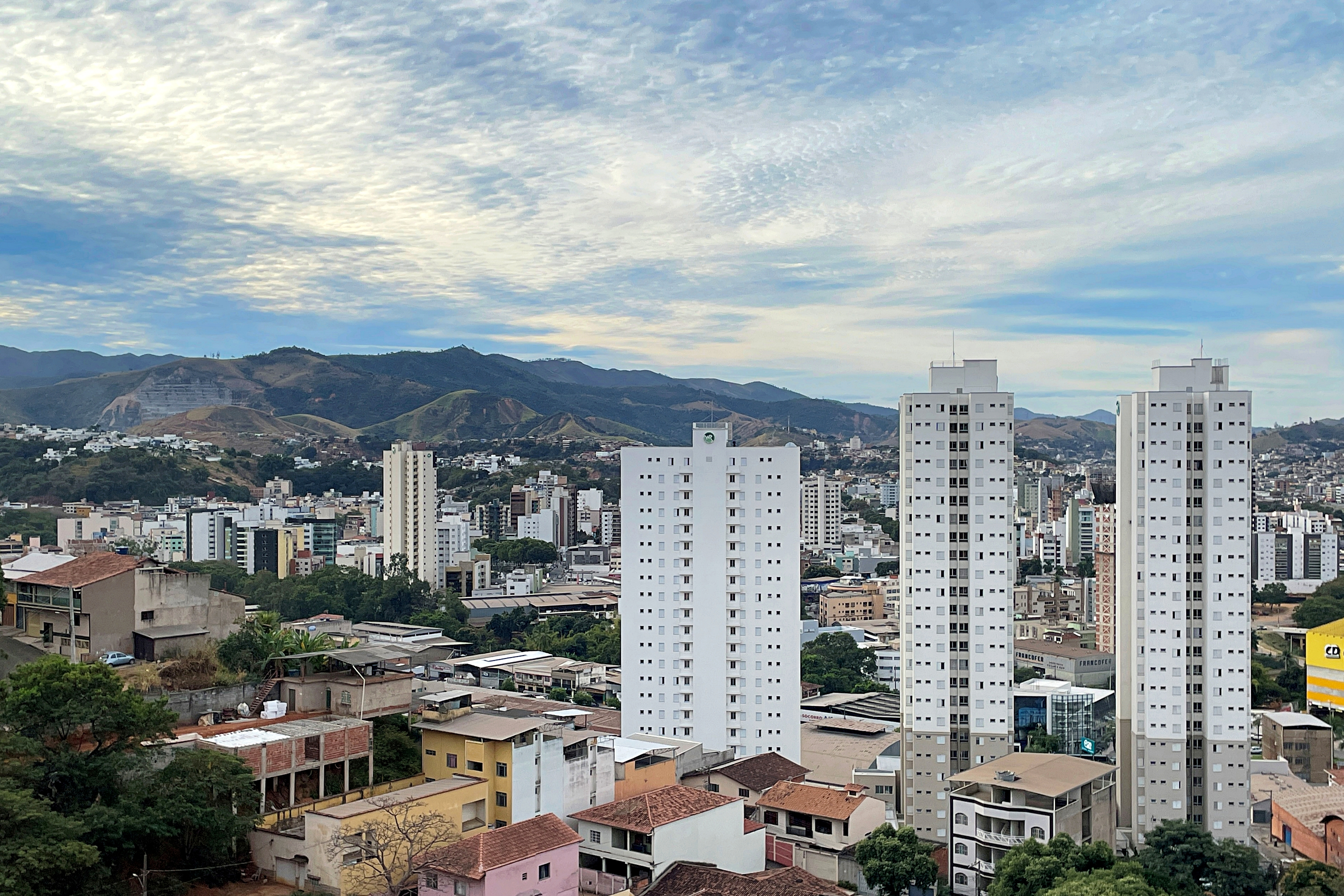
Ipatinga

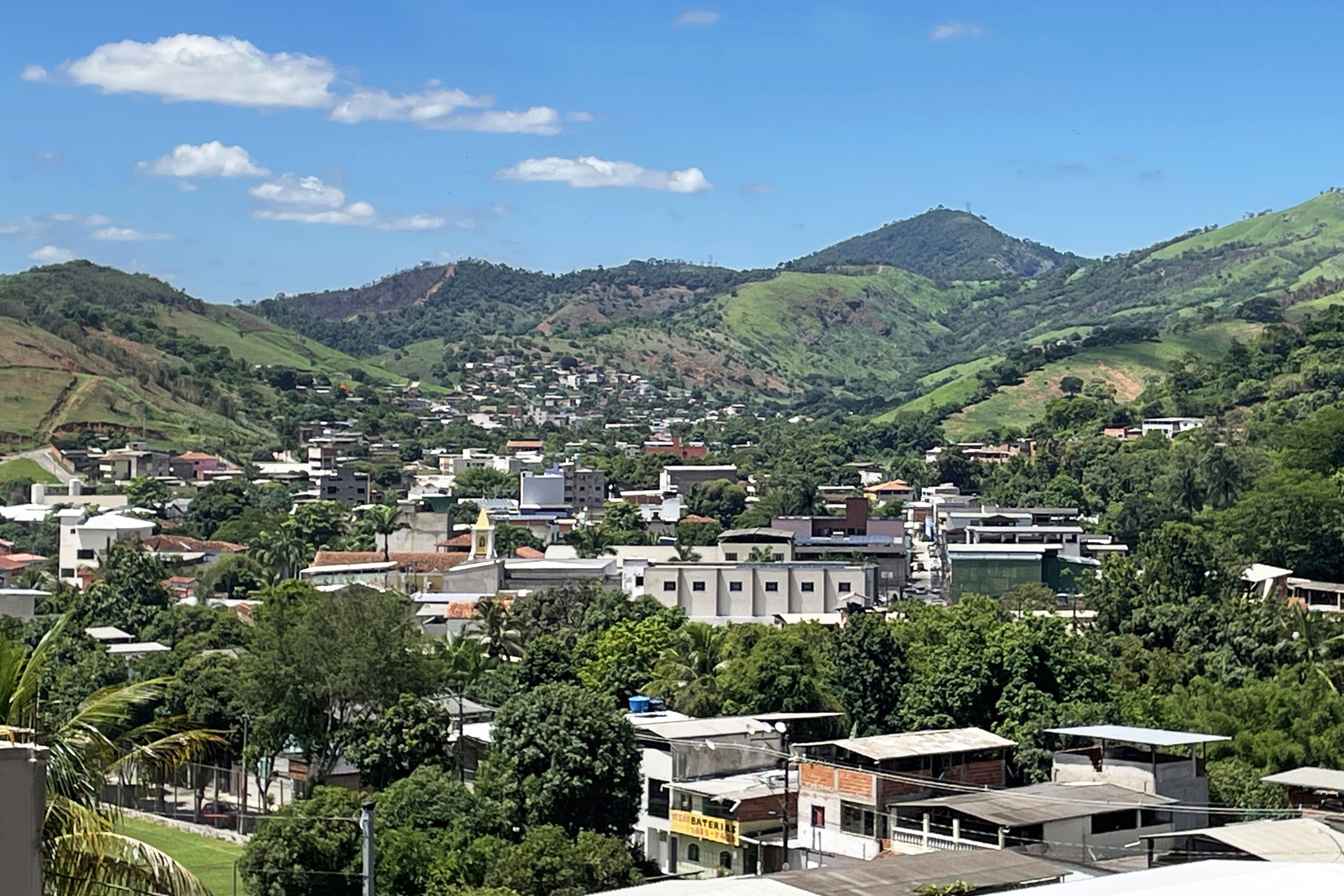
Santana do Paraíso

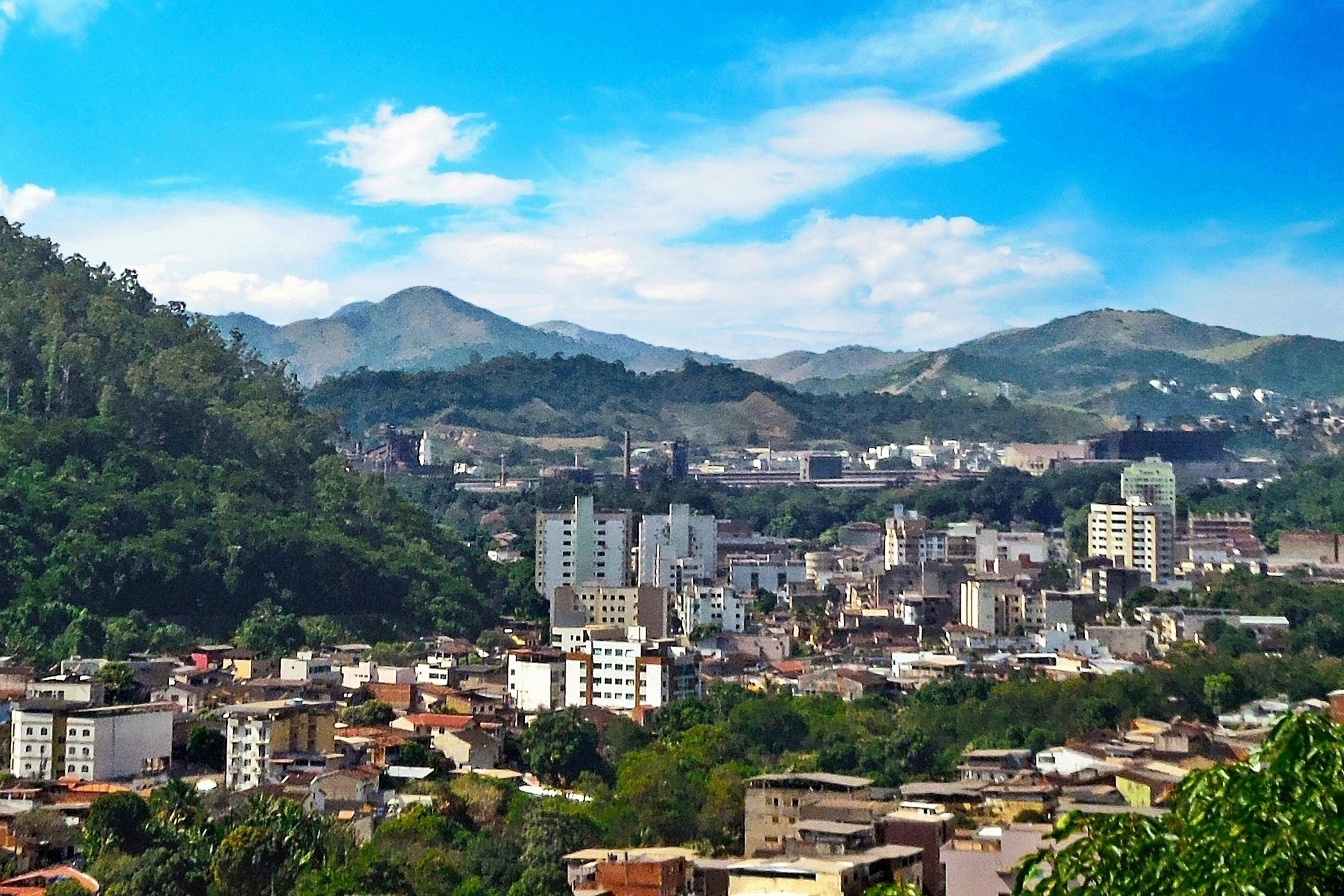
Timóteo

== See also ==
- Ipanema Park
- Colégio Angélica
- Catholic University Center of Eastern Minas Gerais (Unileste)
