= Córrego Novo =

Coordinates: 19.8319°S 42.3958°W

- Municipality
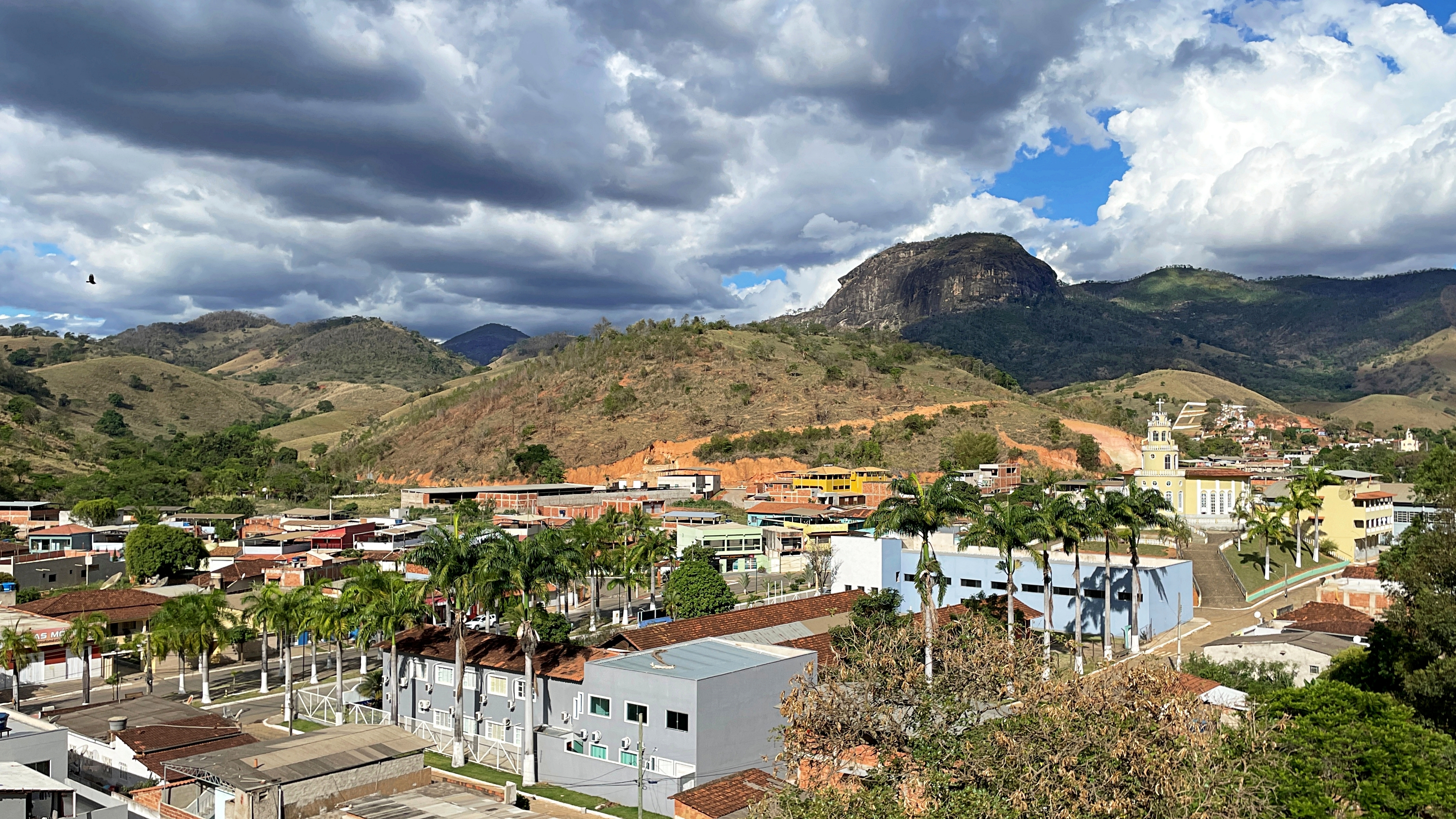
- Partial view of Córrego Novo

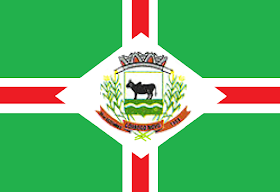
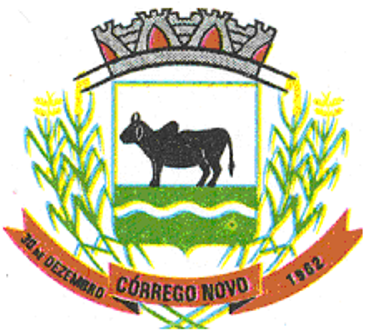
- Flag Coat of arms
- Interactive map of Córrego Novo
- Country: Brazil
- Region: Southeast
- State: Minas Gerais
- Mesoregion: Vale do Rio Doce

Population (2020)
  - Total: 2,728
- Time zone: UTC−3 (BRT)

Córrego Novo is a municipality in the state of Minas Gerais in the Southeast region of Brazil.

== History ==
Its name, which translates to "New Stream" in English, reflects the presence of multiple small watercourses in the area. The town's history dates back to the early settlement efforts by Antônio Albano dos Reis and Cessário Albano dos Reis, who were among the pioneers seeking fertile lands for agriculture. Córrego Novo was officially recognized as a district in 1948 and later gained municipal independence in 1963

== See also ==
- List of municipalities in Minas Gerais
