= Iapu =

Coordinates: 19°26′S 42°13′W

- Municipality
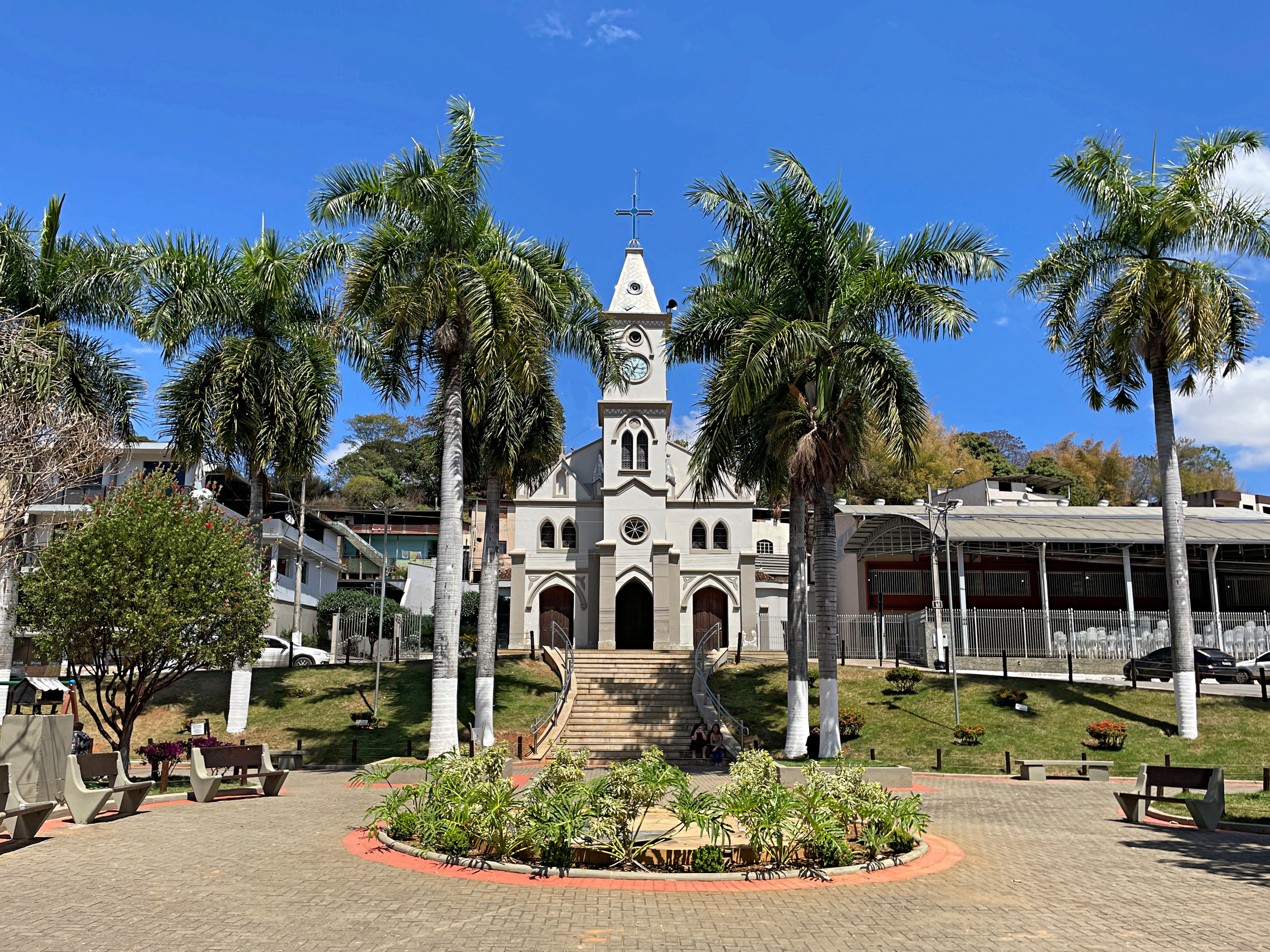
- Higino Fernandes Square with the Saint Stephen Matriz Church in the background

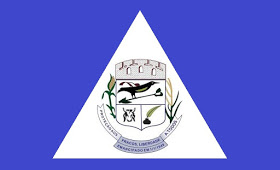
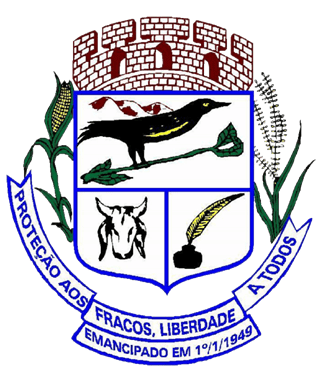
- Flag Coat of arms
- Interactive map of Iapu
- Country: Brazil
- Region: Southeast
- State: Minas Gerais
- Mesoregion: Vale do Rio Doce

Population (2022 Census)
  - Total: 12,030
  - Estimate (2025): 12,583
- Time zone: UTC−3 (BRT)

Iapu is a municipality in the state of Minas Gerais in the Southeast region of Brazil.

== See also ==
- List of municipalities in Minas Gerais
