= Caratinga =

- Municipality
- Municipality of Caratinga
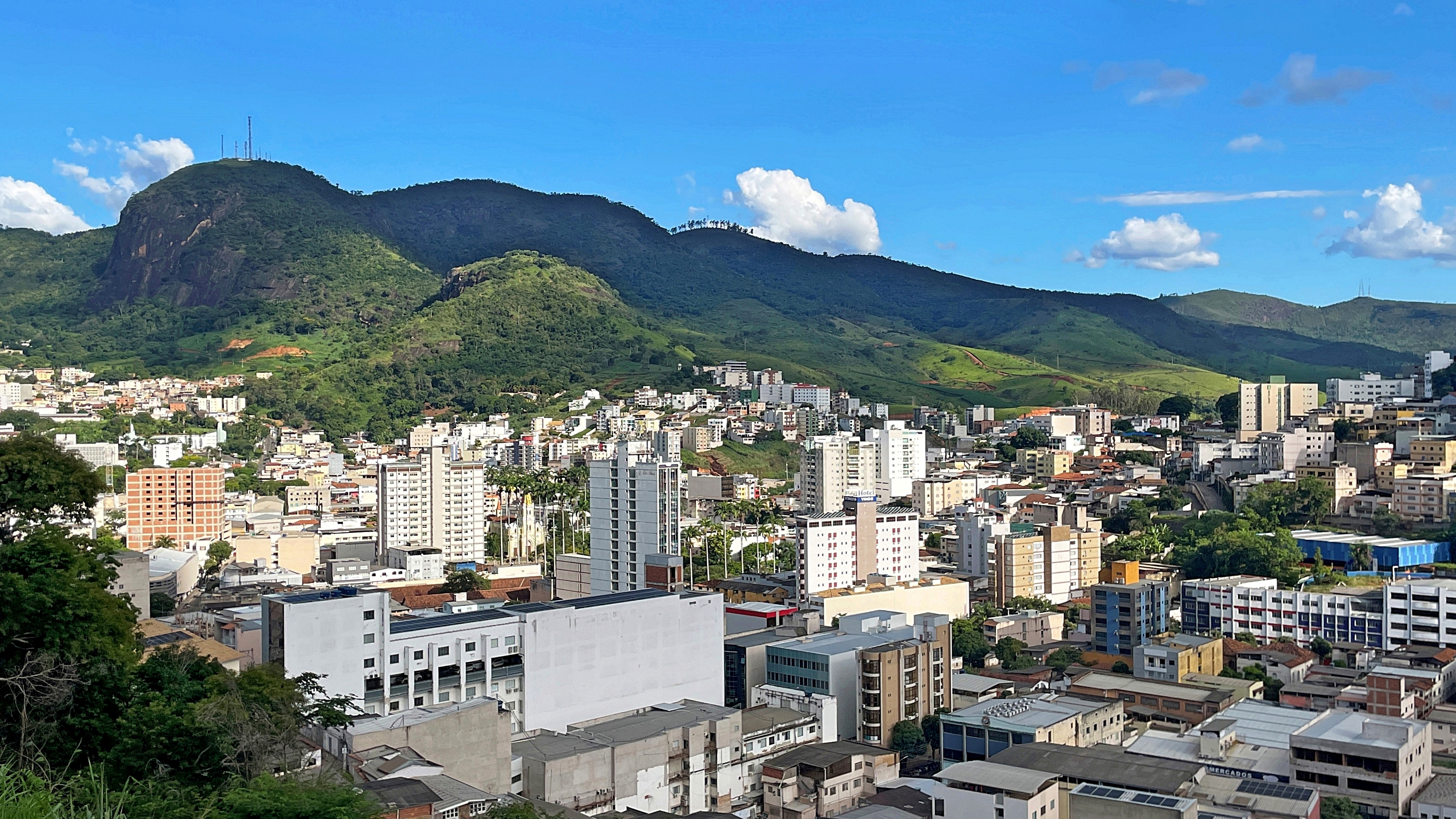
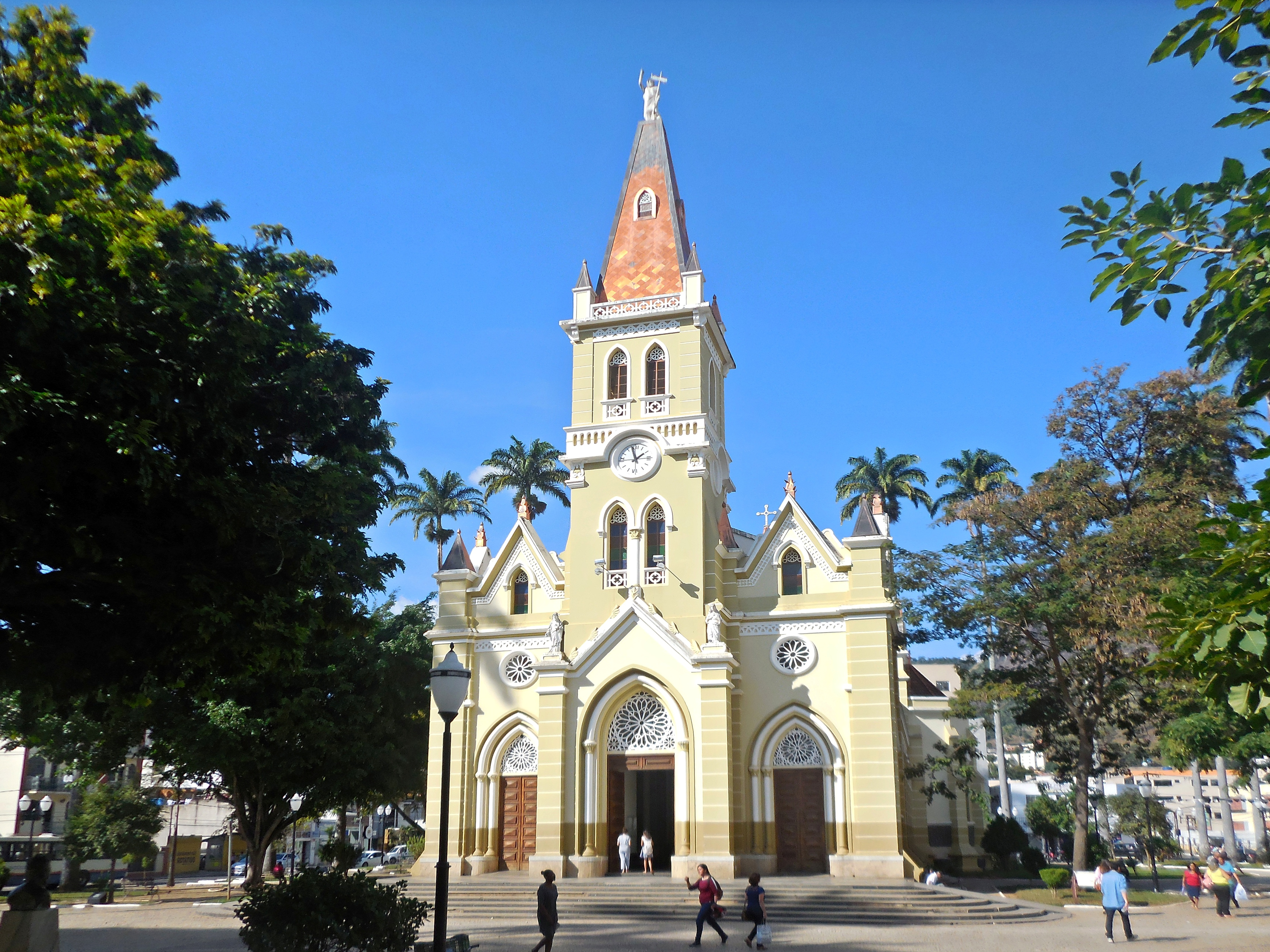
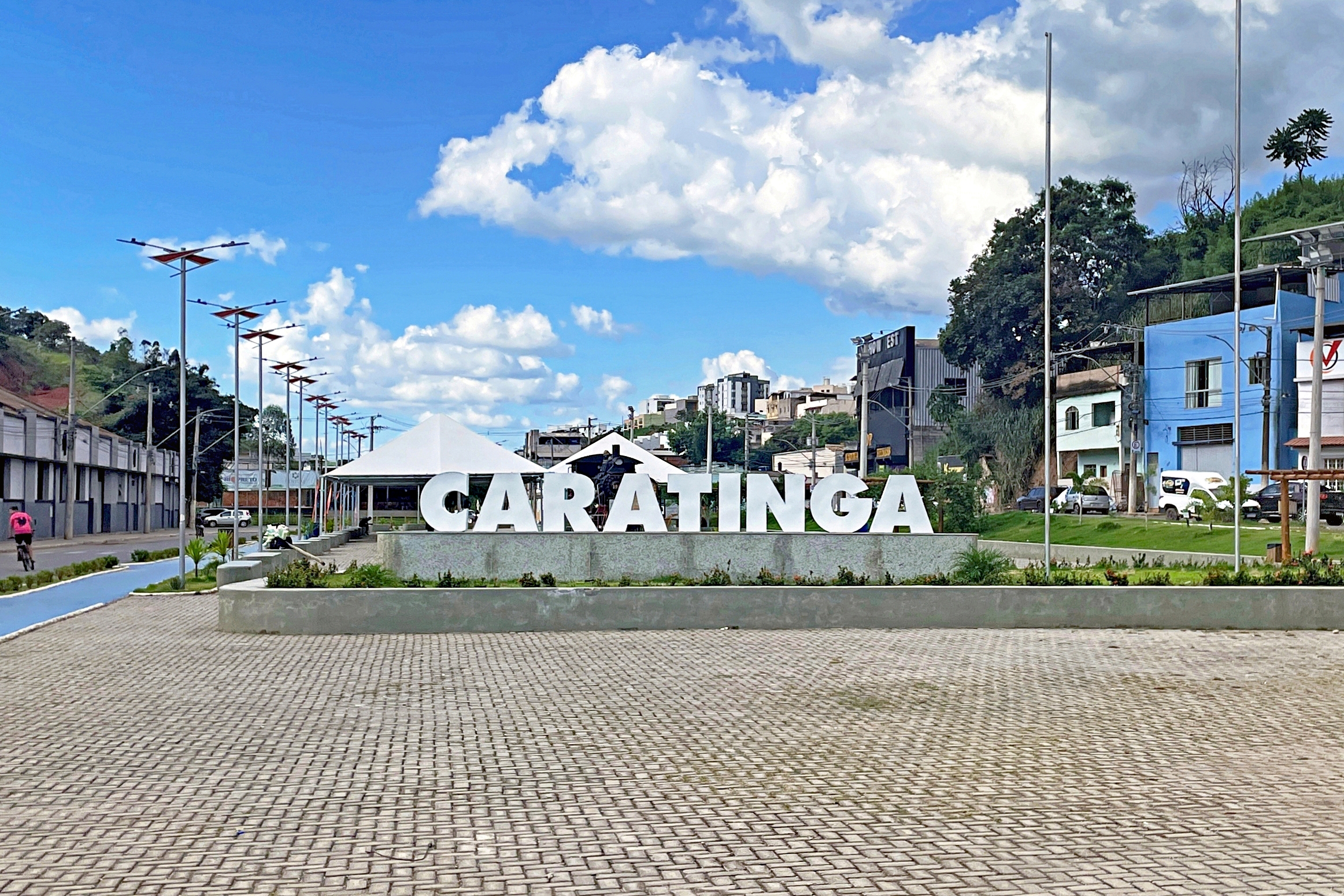
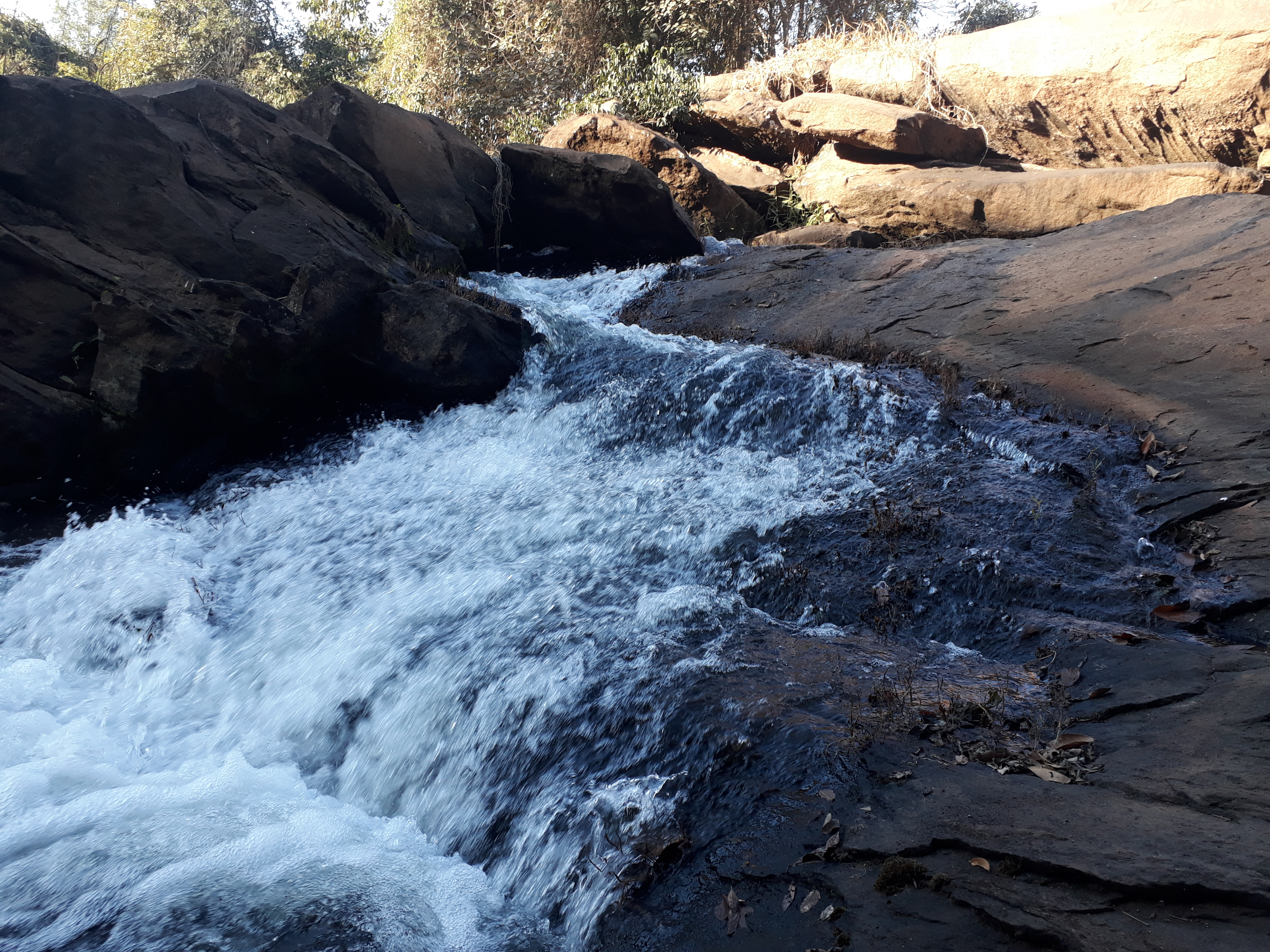
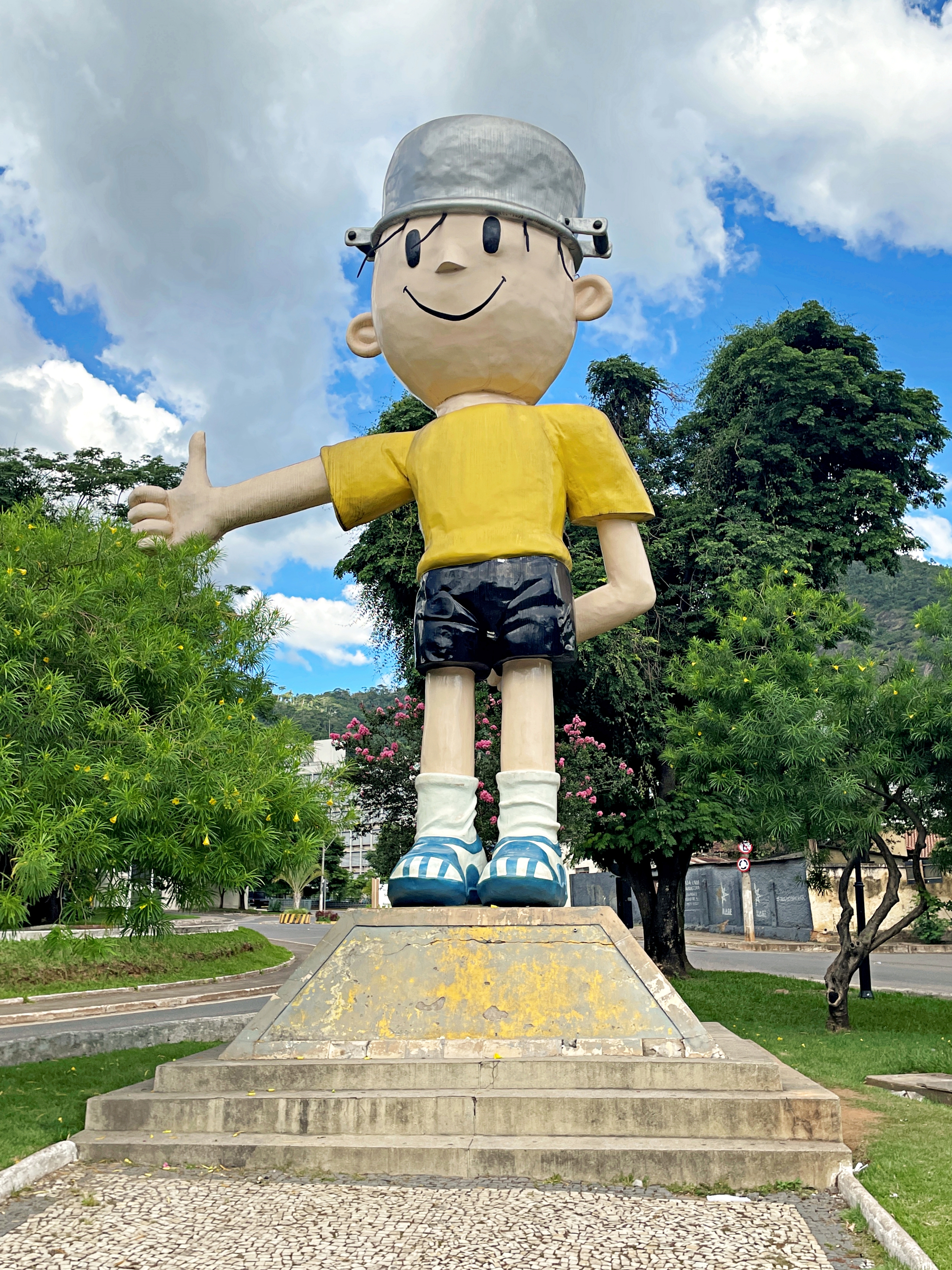
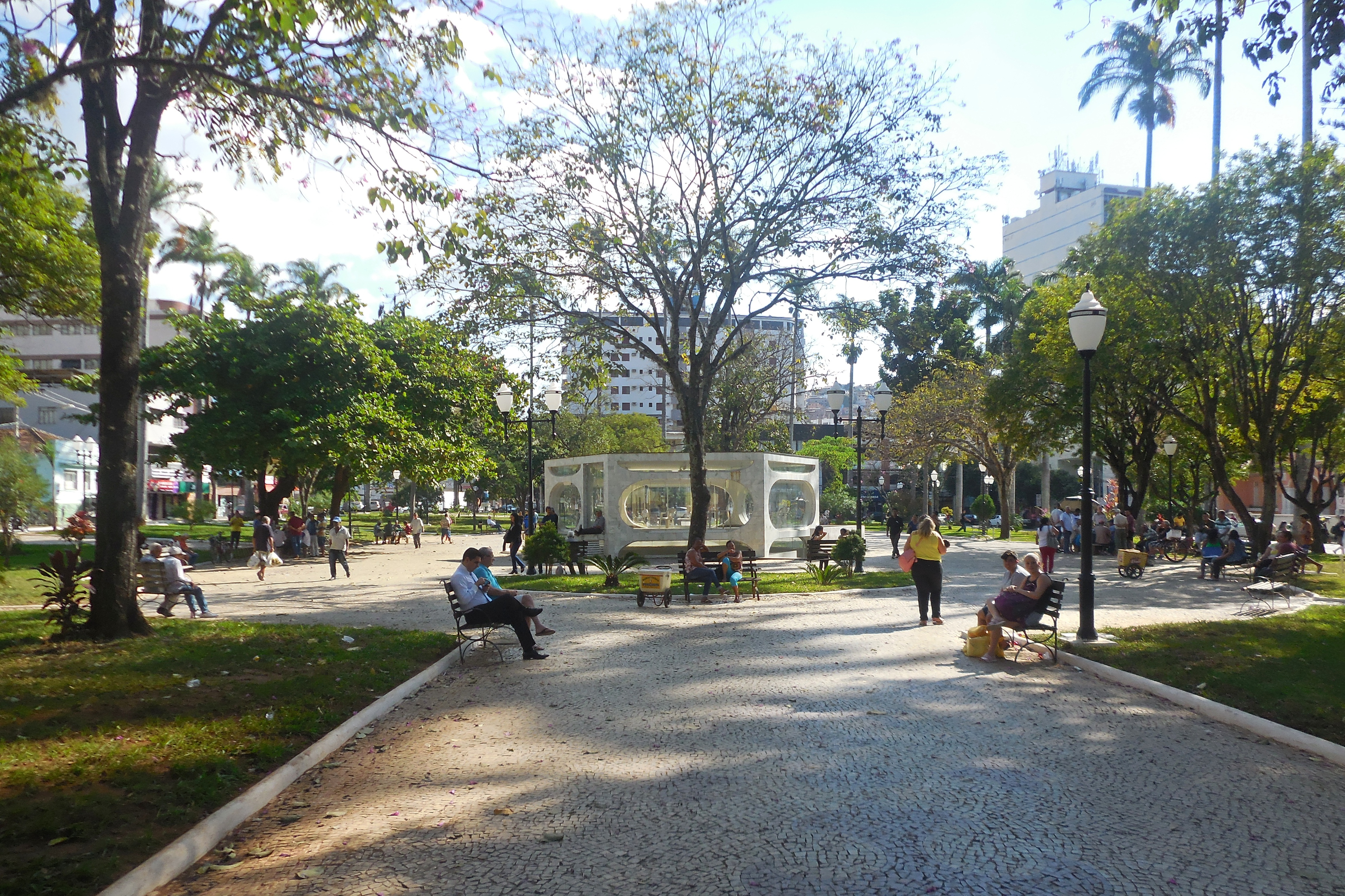
- From top to bottom, left to right: view of the city; St. John the Baptist Cathedral; facade of the House of Doctor Agenor Ludgero Alves (House of Arts); 3D letter sign in the Coronel Raphael da Silva Araújo Square; waterfall in Patrocínio de Caratinga; statue of Menino Maluquinho; Cesário Alvim Square.

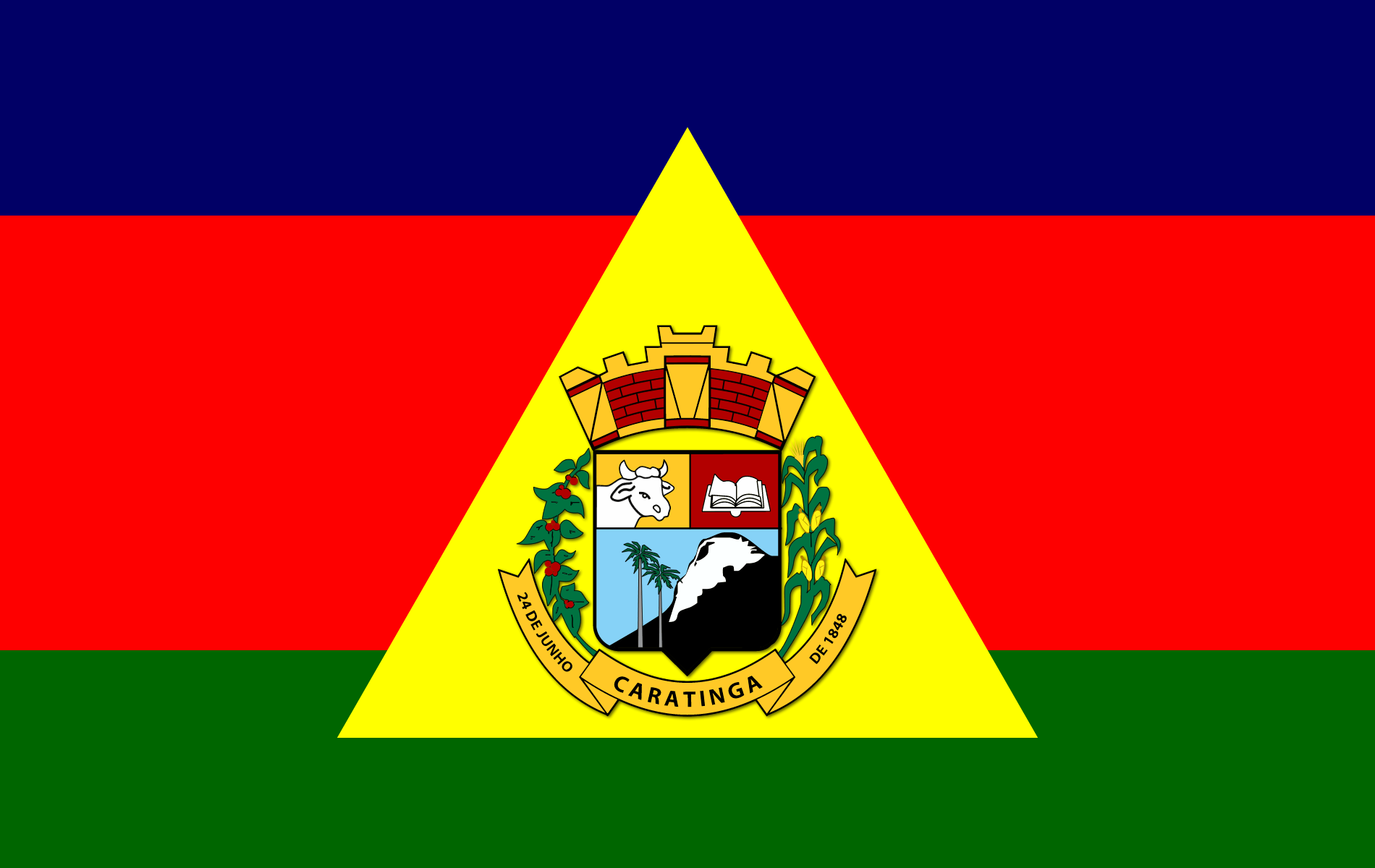
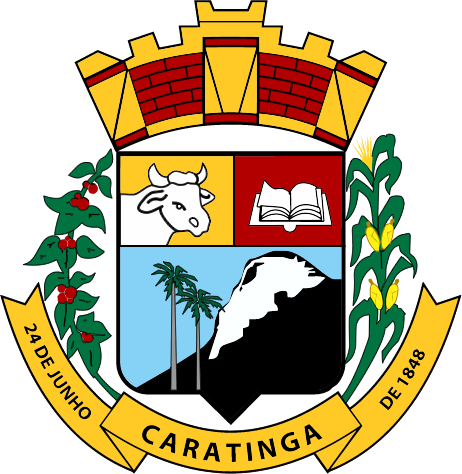
- Flag Coat of arms
- Anthem: Anthem of the Municipality of Caratinga
- Location within Brazil Minas Gerais Location within Brazil
- Coordinates: 19°47′24″S 42°08′20″W
- Country: Brazil
- Region: Southeast
- State: Minas Gerais
- Metropolitan area: Vale do Aço
- Neighboring municipalities: Bom Jesus do Galho, Bugre, Entre Folhas, Iapu, Imbé de Minas, Inhapim, Ipaba, Ipanema, Ipatinga, Piedade de Caratinga, Raul Soares, Santa Bárbara do Leste, Santa Rita de Minas, Santana do Paraíso, Simonésia, Timóteo, Ubaporanga, and Vargem Alegre.
- Founded: 24 June 1848
- Established (as a municipality): 6 February 1890

Government
  - Mayor: Giovanni Correa da Silva (PL)

Area
  - Municipality: 1,258.479 km^{2} (485.901 sq mi)
  - Urban: 17.09 km^{2} (6.60 sq mi)
- Elevation: 578 m (1,896 ft)

Population (2022)
  - Municipality: 87,360
  - Estimate (2024): 90,687
  - Rank: MG: 42nd
  - Density: 69.42/km^{2} (179.8/sq mi)
  - Urban: 73,299
  - Rural: 14,061
- Demonym: Caratinguense

HDI
  - HDI (2010): 0.706 (high)
- Time zone: UTC−3 (BRT)
- GDP (2021): R$2,283,288,080
- GDP per capita (2021): R$24,518.79
- Climate: Tropical savanna (Aw)
- Website: caratinga.mg.gov.br

Caratinga is a Brazilian municipality located in the countryside of the state of Minas Gerais in the Southeast Region of Brazil. Situated in the Vale do Rio Doce, it is part of the Vale do Aço metropolitan area, approximately 190 kilometres (120 mi) east of the state capital, Belo Horizonte. The municipality covers an area of 1,258.479 square kilometres (485.901 sq mi), with 17 square kilometres (6.6 sq mi) in the urban area, and its population was estimated at 90,687 inhabitants in 2024.

The exploration of the region began in the 16th century with expeditions along the Doce and Caratinga rivers in search of precious metals. However, the area was first settled in the 19th century when Domingos Fernandes Lana explored it for ipecac, a valuable medicinal plant, and reported on the fertile lands and peaceful indigenous population. Subsequently, João Caetano do Nascimento, a friend of Lana, led an expedition to the region, claimed the land, and dedicated it to Saint John, officially founding the settlement on 24 June 1848, in honor of the saint's feast day.

Favorable agricultural conditions and its strategic location as the only urban center on the right bank of the Caratinga River spurred population growth, leading to emancipation from Manhuaçu in 1890. Despite unplanned urban expansion, development accelerated with the arrival of the Leopoldina Railway and the BR-116 (Rio–Bahia Highway) in the 1930s and 1940s. The coffee industry flourished in the 1950s following the establishment of an office of the Brazilian Coffee Institute, positioning Caratinga as a coffee production hub. Coffee cultivation, alongside commerce, remains a primary source of income, though industry has grown since the 1980s. A new urban nucleus also emerged parallel to the original city center due to the expansion of the Vale do Aço metropolitan area.

Caratinga is home to significant environmental conservation areas, including the Feliciano Miguel Abdala Private Natural Heritage Reserve, one of Minas Gerais' most important Atlantic Forest remnants, which shelters the northern muriqui, one of the largest primates in the Americas. The reserve attracts researchers from around the world. Other notable landmarks include the Pedra Itaúna, historic farms, waterfalls, and lagoons in the rural areas, and the scenic Cesário Alvim Square, which includes the St. John the Baptist Cathedral, built in 1930. Cultural traditions such as the Folia de Reis, artistic festivals, and June festivals are also prominent.

== History ==
=== Exploration and colonization ===
The area now comprising Caratinga saw little colonization until the mid-19th century, except by the indigenous Aimorés (Bugre tribe). Occasionally, the Botocudo people ventured along the Caratinga River from its confluence with the Doce River in search of food or due to weather conditions. Exploration began with expeditions such as that of Spinosa in 1553, heading toward the São Francisco River, and Sebastião Fernandes Tourinho, who explored the Caratinga River in 1573.

In the early 18th century, during the colonial period, settlers from the Captaincy of Espírito Santo ventured inland, primarily seeking gold. Notably, Pedro Bueno Cacunda, in 1733, explored the region encompassing much of present-day Caratinga, between the Itapeba River (later named Cuiethé, now Caratinga) and the Mayguassu River (Manhuaçu River), searching for gold in streams and tributaries. By the late 18th century, the Estrada do Degredo was established, crossing the current municipal territory and connecting the Estrada Real in Ouro Preto to the Cuité prison (now Conselheiro Pena), serving as an alternative route to the Doce River.

In the 19th century, Domingos Fernandes Lana, from Araponga, explored the region in search of ipecac, a valuable medicinal plant. Around 1841, accompanied by friends, servants, slaves, and catechized indigenous people, he traversed the Caratinga River. Lana named the area's rock formations "Caratinga" due to the abundance of yam, an edible tuber also known as caratinga. The term derives from the Tupi word aka'ratin'ga, meaning "white yam". The expedition continued toward Cuité, near Conselheiro Pena.

The fertile lands and peaceful indigenous population attracted João Caetano do Nascimento, a friend of Lana, who arrived with his elder sons and companions João da Cunha, João José, and João Antonio de Oliveira, along with their families and servants. On 23 June 1848, they celebrated Saint John's Day with a large bonfire, dedicating the land and founding the settlement in honor of the patron saint. João Caetano settled in the area now known as Serra da Jacutinga, claiming large land grants. He began clearing vegetation and preparing the land for cultivating cereals, fruits, and vegetables, as well as raising small animals and poultry, encouraging further settlement. In June 1848, a parish was established under the comarca of Mariana.

=== Emancipation and administrative development ===
São João Church, Caratinga's first parish church

Princesa Isabel state school, built in 1909.

The settlement initially developed irregularly. In 1867, construction began on the São João Church, now a listed cultural heritage site, with Father Maximiano João da Cruz as its first priest. By Provincial Law No. 2,027 of 1 December 1873, the settlement was elevated to a district under Manhuaçu, named São João do Caratinga. A parish was created to represent the community.

The fertile lands and its position as the only urban center on the right bank of the Caratinga River sustained population growth, attracting settlers from southern regions aiming to reach the Doce River. This established Caratinga as a significant regional hub, leading to its emancipation by State Decree No. 16 on 6 February 1890, under the name Caratinga, signed by Governor José Cesário de Faria Alvim. In 1890, the population was approximately 25,000 across an area of 10,572 square kilometres (4,082 sq mi).

Upon emancipation, Caratinga included the districts of Bom Jesus do Galho, Cuieté, Entre Folhas, Floresta, Santo Antônio do Manhuaçu, and São Francisco Vermelho, alongside the municipal seat. The municipality was officially established on 12 May 1890, confirmed by State Law No. 2 of 14 September 1891. The first municipal chamber was sworn in on 7 March 1892, with Symphrônio Fernandes as president and municipal governor. The Caratinga comarca was created by Law No. 11 of 13 November 1891, enacted by Cesário Alvim, and established on 7 May 1892. It was briefly abolished in 1912 but restored on 1 December 1917.

Over time, the municipality underwent several administrative changes. In 1911, it comprised Bom Jesus do Galho (emancipated in 1943), Cuieté (incorporated into Itanhomi in 1923, now Conselheiro Pena), Entre Folhas (emancipated in 1992), Floresta (incorporated into Itanhomi in 1923, now Alvarenga), Imbé (emancipated in 1995 as Imbé de Minas), Inhapim (emancipated in 1938), Resplendor (incorporated into Aimorés in 1915), Santo Antônio do Manhuaçu, São Francisco do Vermelho (abolished before 1920, restored in 1924 as a district of Raul Soares), Tarumirim (incorporated into Itanhomi in 1923), and Vermelho Novo (incorporated into Matipó in 1923), alongside the municipal seat. With Inhapim's emancipation in 1938, the districts of Santo Estevão and Veadinho (created in 1923) were also detached.

Until the end of the First Brazilian Republic, in the 1930s, coronelism dominated, with two political factions, "caranguejo" and "bacurau", alternating power. From 1919 to 1930, the Empresa Industrial de Caratinga began producing and distributing electricity. In 1927, Agenor Ludgero Alves, a prominent political figure, signed a contract integrating Caratinga into the Leopoldina Railway, inaugurated in 1930. The railway spurred urban development by making it easier to open roads and access other regions. Initially, it provided passenger transport to Rio de Janeiro. Between the 1930s and 1940s, Mayor Omar Coutinho cleared public debts, and the BR-116 (Rio–Bahia Highway) enhanced commerce and development. The railway ceased passenger and cargo transport in the 1970s.

=== Urban consolidation and recent history ===
Old Caratinga Railway Station, built in 1930 and deactivated in 1970s.

The coffee industry surged in the 1950s with the establishment of a Brazilian Coffee Institute office, making Caratinga a coffee production hub. However, in the 1950s and 1960s, many residents migrated to the Vale do Aço for opportunities driven by the industrial complexes of Acesita in Timóteo and Usiminas in Ipatinga. Urban expansion occurred in the 1970s under Mayor Moacyr de Mattos toward the Limoeiro neighborhood and in the 1990s under Dário da Anunciação Grossi toward the second unit of the Caratinga University Center. However, growth was unplanned, extending toward surrounding hills, leading to irregular land occupations and slums.

Parallel to the original city center, a new development zone emerged near the border with Ipatinga. As urban expansion space diminished in the Vale do Aço metropolitan area, the BR-458 facilitated access, prompting investors to develop subdivisions in Caratinga. In the 1980s and 1990s, Caratinga integrated into the Vale do Aço urban agglomeration, alongside Belo Oriente and Santana do Paraíso. In January 2012, Caratinga was officially included in the Vale do Aço metropolitan area by Complementary Law 122.

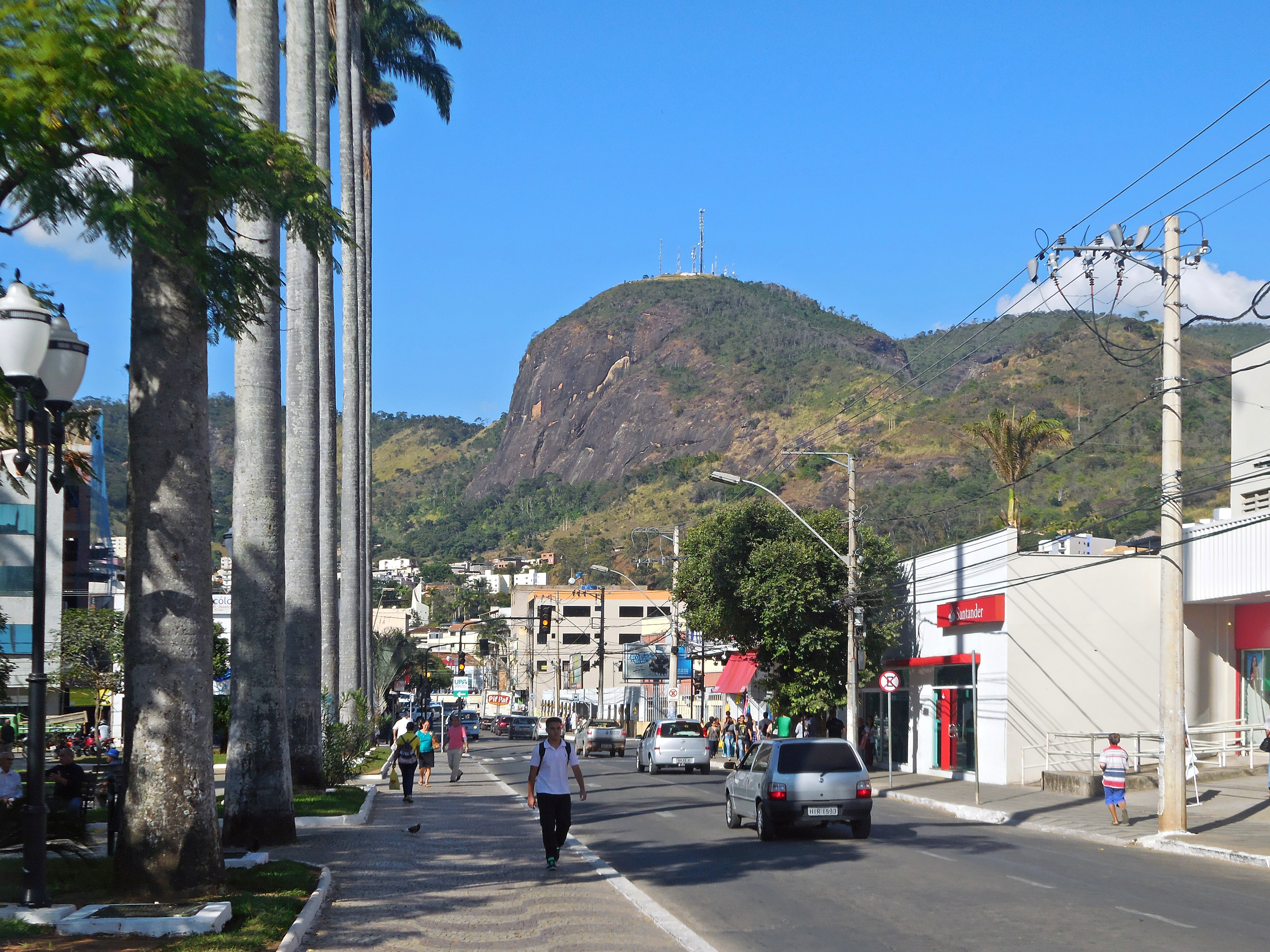
Cesário Alvim in 2018

State Law No. 10,704 of 27 April 1992 led to the emancipation of the districts of Entre Folhas (created in 1890), Ubaporanga (1938), Santa Bárbara do Leste (1948), Santa Rita de Minas (1948), Vargem Alegre (1953), and Ipaba (1982). State Law No. 12,030 of 21 December 1995 emancipated Imbé de Minas (1890) and Piedade de Caratinga (1991). Since then, the municipality comprises the districts of Santo Antônio do Manhuaçu (1890), Dom Lara (1948), Santa Efigênia de Caratinga (1948), Sapucaia (1948), São Cândido (1952), São João do Jacutinga (1952), Cordeiro de Minas (1991), Patrocínio de Caratinga (1991), Santa Luzia de Caratinga (1991), and Dom Modesto (1992), alongside the municipal seat. Despite these changes, Caratinga remains a regional hub for cities west of the Serra do Caparaó.

Unplanned occupation along the Caratinga River and smaller waterways, as well as on hills, has increased vulnerability to natural disasters. In January 2003, flooding of urban waterways, particularly the Caratinga River, inundated the city center, displacing 6,800 people, destroying 433 homes, endangering 80 properties, closing 120 public roads, damaging 38 bridges and rural roads, and affecting 446 commercial establishments. Three deaths occurred, the city was isolated, and Mayor Ernani Campos Porto declared a state of emergency, halting commerce, industry, and public services for a week. In January 2004, floods again struck, flooding the city center, declaring a state of emergency, causing deaths, damaging at least 77 homes, and destroying 24 others.

Efforts to channel urban streams and mitigate flood damage have been implemented, including river level monitoring and flood alert systems to reduce the impact of potential overflows. After sewage fees were charged since 1999, a wastewater treatment plant began operations in 2017. Overall, access to basic infrastructure (piped water, sewage, waste collection, and electricity) expanded significantly between the 1990s and 2010s, though slums and a significant housing shortage persist, among the highest in the Vale do Aço metropolitan area.

== Geography ==
According to the Brazilian Institute of Geography and Statistics (IBGE), Caratinga's area is 1,258.479 square kilometres (485.901 sq mi), with 17.09 square kilometres (6.60 sq mi) in the urban area. Located at 19°47′24″S 42°08′20″W, it is 311 kilometres (193 mi) east of Belo Horizonte, within the Vale do Aço metropolitan area alongside 23 other cities since January 2012. Its neighboring municipalities are Inhapim to the northeast and north; Imbé de Minas, Piedade de Caratinga, Ubaporanga, Iapu, and Ipaba to the north; Santana do Paraíso to the northwest; Ipatinga and Timóteo to the west; Bom Jesus do Galho, Vargem Alegre, and Entre Folhas to the southwest; Raul Soares, Santa Rita de Minas, and Santa Bárbara do Leste to the south; Simonésia to the southeast; and Ipanema to the east.

According to the regional division established by the IBGE in 2017, Caratinga belongs to the Ipatinga Intermediate Geographic Region and the Caratinga Immediate Geographic Region. Previously, under the mesoregion and microregion divisions, it was part of the Caratinga microregion within the Vale do Rio Doce mesoregion.

=== Topography and hydrography ===
Undulating terrain in the municipality

The predominant terrain in Caratinga is characterized by a "sea of hills," with undulating landscapes, isolated rock formations, and susceptibility to erosion and landslides. The highest elevation is 1,516 metres (4,974 ft) at Serra do Rio Preto, while the lowest is at the mouth of the Boachá stream, at 330 metres (1,080 ft). The city center is at an elevation of 578.1 metres (1,897 ft). The original urban area developed amidst undulating terrain and expanded toward surrounding hills without a proper urban plan, leading to irregular occupations and land cuts prone to landslides. The local soil features granite and gneiss complexes interspersed with mafic minerals, supporting latosols (red-yellow soils with iron oxides), ideal for coffee cultivation.

The municipality lies within the Caratinga River basin, part of the Doce River Basin. The Doce River borders the municipality at its boundaries with Ipatinga and Santana do Paraíso, while the Caratinga River runs through the municipal territory and urban area, joined by smaller streams such as Salim, Sales, Santa Cruz, São João, and Seco. Urban waterways are subject to considerable levels of water contamination, causing flooding, unpleasant odors, and the proliferation of insects. The rural area features numerous springs and streams, including the Providência, Chaves, Calixto, Macaquinho, Silvestre, Marcinos, Leite, Pastor, and São Cândido springs, as well as the Ribeirão do Boi, Macaco, Lagoa Nova, and Laje streams. The Laje stream supplies the city with water. Lagoons are common in the western part of the municipality.

=== Climate ===
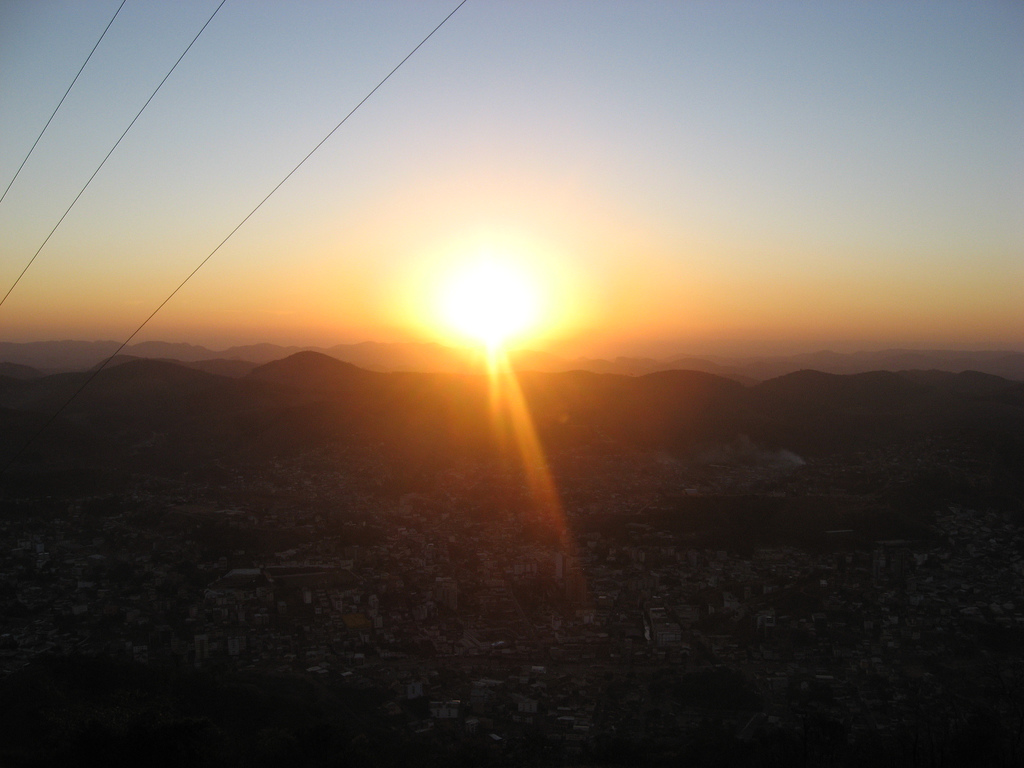
The city at sunset viewed from Pedra Itaúna

Caratinga's climate ranges from mild mesothermal tropical semi-humid to hot semi-humid (Aw), with a hot semi-humid climate near the Doce River. The average annual temperature is 22 °C (72 °F), with an average rainfall of 1,200 millimetres (47 in) per year, concentrated between October and April. The wet season coincides with warmer months, while the dry season spans milder months, with autumn and spring as transitional seasons. The transition between dry and wet seasons often brings thunderstorms, especially from late winter to spring.

Precipitation primarily falls as rain, with occasional hail, causing damage in both urban and rural areas. Storms may include lightning and strong wind gusts. According to the National Institute for Space Research’s Atmospheric Electricity Group (ELAT/INPE) in 2018, Caratinga had a lightning density of 1.395 strikes per km²/year, ranking 642nd in Minas Gerais and 4,241st nationally. With over 2,300 hours of insolation annually, the average relative humidity is 77%, though low humidity levels occur during the dry season or prolonged Indian summers. Dry air and pollution increase the concentration of atmospheric pollutants, which degrades air quality.

Highest 24-hour precipitation accumulations recorded in Caratinga by month (INMET)
Month	Accumulation	Date	Month	Accumulation	Date
January	120.7 millimetres (4.75 in)	25 January 2020	July	41.3 millimetres (1.63 in)	11 July 1965
February	103.4 millimetres (4.07 in)	8 February 2021	August	55.5 millimetres (2.19 in)	26 August 1986
March	150 millimetres (5.9 in)	26 March 1973	September	73.3 millimetres (2.89 in)	29 September 2022
April	131.5 millimetres (5.18 in)	22 April 1977	October	123.2 millimetres (4.85 in)	31 October 2020
May	46.8 millimetres (1.84 in)	25 May 2014	November	119.5 millimetres (4.70 in)	7 November 1999
June	47.8 millimetres (1.88 in)	12 June 1993	December	164.9 millimetres (6.49 in)	2 December 2017
Period: 1 January 1961 to 10 July 1968, 1 November 1971 to 31 December 1983, 1 January 1986 to 31 December 1987, and 1 January 1991 to 30 June 2024

Fog occurs on cold mornings due to high humidity and low temperatures, while frost may occur in rural areas during intense polar air mass events, such as in Santa Luzia de Caratinga in July 2019, with unofficial sub-zero temperatures. The prevailing wind comes from the east, with an average speed of 11.1 kilometres per hour (6.9 mph) during the windiest period (5 August to 11 January), peaking slightly in September and October. During the calmer period (April to June), speeds range from 8 to 9 kilometres per hour (5.0 to 5.6 mph).

According to the National Institute of Meteorology's (INMET) conventional measurements for the periods from 1961 to 1968, 1971 to 1983, 1986 to 1987, and from January 1991 to June 2024, the lowest temperature recorded was 4.2 °C (39.6 °F) on 1 June 1979 and 16 June 2006, though the absolute minimum since 1924 was 1.4 °C (34.5 °F) on 18 July 1926. The highest was 39 °C (102 °F) on 7 October 2020. The lowest relative humidity was 22% on 12 July 1996 and 5 September 2008. The highest 24-hour precipitation was 164.9 millimetres (6.49 in) on 2 December 2017, followed by 150 millimetres (5.9 in) on 26 March 1973, 131.5 millimetres (5.18 in) on 22 April 1977, 123.2 millimetres (4.85 in) on 31 October 2020, and 120.7 millimetres (4.75 in) on 25 January 2020.

Data from INMET's automatic weather station, installed on 23 May 2007, recorded a low of 6.4 °C (43.5 °F) on 31 July 2007 and a high of 39.4 °C (102.9 °F) on 31 October 2012, 17 October 2015, and 25 September 2023. The lowest relative humidity was 14% on multiple dates. The highest 24-hour precipitation was 126 millimetres (5.0 in) on 25 January 2020, with the highest hourly precipitation of 72.4 millimetres (2.85 in) between 19:00 and 20:00 on 27 February 2013. The strongest wind gust was 88.56 kilometres per hour (55.03 mph) during a storm on 9 December 2010.

Climate data for Caratinga (1981–2010 normals, extremes 1961–present)
Month	Jan	Feb	Mar	Apr	May	Jun	Jul	Aug	Sep	Oct	Nov	Dec	Year
Record high °C (°F)	37.2 (99.0)	36.9 (98.4)	35.8 (96.4)	34.1 (93.4)	32.8 (91.0)	33.3 (91.9)	33.4 (92.1)	35.2 (95.4)	38.0 (100.4)	39.0 (102.2)	38.0 (100.4)	35.7 (96.3)	39.0 (102.2)
Mean daily maximum °C (°F)	28.9 (84.0)	30.0 (86.0)	29.4 (84.9)	27.9 (82.2)	26.1 (79.0)	25.2 (77.4)	25.5 (77.9)	26.4 (79.5)	27.2 (81.0)	28.1 (82.6)	28.0 (82.4)	28.5 (83.3)	27.6 (81.7)
Daily mean °C (°F)	23.6 (74.5)	24.1 (75.4)	23.5 (74.3)	22.0 (71.6)	19.7 (67.5)	18.2 (64.8)	18.2 (64.8)	19.4 (66.9)	20.9 (69.6)	22.5 (72.5)	22.9 (73.2)	23.3 (73.9)	21.5 (70.7)
Mean daily minimum °C (°F)	19.4 (66.9)	19.4 (66.9)	19.0 (66.2)	17.3 (63.1)	14.7 (58.5)	12.9 (55.2)	12.6 (54.7)	13.7 (56.7)	15.7 (60.3)	17.8 (64.0)	18.6 (65.5)	19.1 (66.4)	16.7 (62.1)
Record low °C (°F)	11.4 (52.5)	14 (57)	9.7 (49.5)	8.8 (47.8)	4.5 (40.1)	4.2 (39.6)	4.4 (39.9)	5.8 (42.4)	5.4 (41.7)	10.9 (51.6)	12 (54)	9.6 (49.3)	4.2 (39.6)
Average precipitation mm (inches)	220.8 (8.69)	96.7 (3.81)	143.8 (5.66)	70.6 (2.78)	25.6 (1.01)	12.5 (0.49)	6.5 (0.26)	15.5 (0.61)	41.6 (1.64)	80.4 (3.17)	209.1 (8.23)	278.6 (10.97)	1,201.7 (47.31)
Average precipitation days (≥ ≥ 1 mm)	13	7	11	7	4	2	1	2	4	7	12	16	86
Average relative humidity (%)	79.5	75.6	79.0	80.6	80.4	79.7	75.2	71.2	70.0	69.7	76.7	80.3	76.5
Mean monthly sunshine hours	187.9	209.2	208.0	198.5	200.0	192.0	210.1	219.7	174.0	172.0	153.0	166.1	2,290.5
Source: National Institute of Meteorology (INMET) temperature records: 01 January 1961 to 10 July 1968, 01 November 1971 to 31 December 1983, 01 January 1986 to 31 December 1987, and 01 January 1991 to 30 June 2024

Climate data for Caratinga (automatic station)
Month	Jan	Feb	Mar	Apr	May	Jun	Jul	Aug	Sep	Oct	Nov	Dec	Year
Record high °C (°F)	37.8 (100.0)	36.6 (97.9)	36.8 (98.2)	35 (95)	34.3 (93.7)	34.2 (93.6)	33.2 (91.8)	36.4 (97.5)	39.4 (102.9)	39.4 (102.9)	39.1 (102.4)	36.8 (98.2)	39.4 (102.9)
Record low °C (°F)	15.3 (59.5)	15.7 (60.3)	16.3 (61.3)	11.9 (53.4)	7.7 (45.9)	6.6 (43.9)	6.4 (43.5)	7.5 (45.5)	9.6 (49.3)	13.5 (56.3)	13.8 (56.8)	16.3 (61.3)	6.4 (43.5)
Source: National Institute of Meteorology (INMET) — temperature records: 23 May 2007–31 December 2024

=== Ecology and environment ===
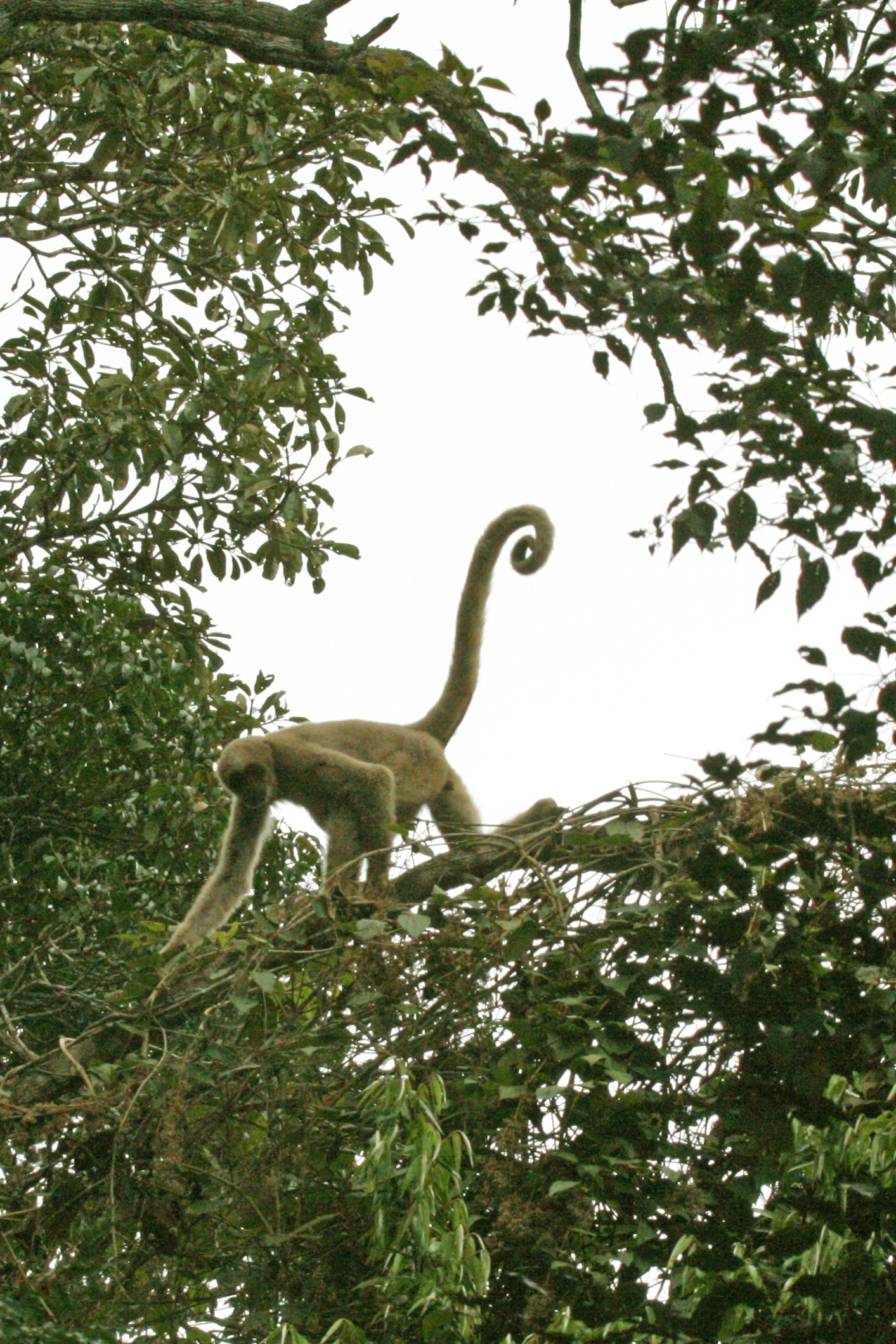
A northern muriqui in the Feliciano Miguel Abdala Private Natural Heritage Reserve

The native vegetation belongs to the Atlantic Forest domain, with remnants covering 11,156 hectares (27,570 acres) in 2011, or 8.9% of the municipal area. Much of the original vegetation has been cleared for pastures and agriculture, which continues to pressure conservation areas. Some areas of the municipality practice monoculture reforestation with eucalyptus to produce raw material for the Cenibra pulp mill in Belo Oriente. Caratinga has two environmental protection areas (APAs): the Lagoas de Caratinga APA and the Pedra Itaúna APA. The Lagoas de Caratinga APA is largely used for eucalyptus cultivation, while the Pedra Itaúna APA, near the urban area, suffers from occasional fires. The Caratinga Municipal Park, spanning 402 hectares, also faces degradation.

Caratinga is home to two private natural heritage reserves (RPPNs): the Lagoa Silvana State Natural Heritage Reserve and the Feliciano Miguel Abdala Federal Private Natural Heritage Reserve. The Lagoa Silvana State Natural Heritage Reserve, near the Rio Doce State Park, owned by Usiminas, was established in 2000 and formalized in 2012. The Feliciano Miguel Abdala Private Natural Heritage Reserve, purchased by Feliciano Miguel Abdala in 1942 for conservation, particularly of the northern muriqui, one of the largest primates in the Americas, spans 957 hectares, 80% of which is preserved forest. Recognized as a private natural heritage reserve in 2001, it supports global scientific research at the Caratinga Biological Station (EBC). In 2015, approximately 1,000 northern muriquis remained in Brazil, with 361 in Caratinga.

Conserved areas boast notable biodiversity, including the Geoffroy's cat, jaguarundi, coati, agouti, tayra, pale-throated sloth, crab-eating raccoon, greater grison, Brazilian squirrel, capybara, and red brocket. Bird species include the dusky-legged guan and solitary tinamou, as well as several species of hawks. In 2014, a 66,424.5607 hectares (164,138.664 acres) area across Caratinga, Simonésia, Manhuaçu, Ipanema, Santa Bárbara do Leste, Santa Rita de Minas, and Piedade de Caratinga was designated as Minas Gerais’ first wildlife corridor, linking the Feliciano Miguel Abdala Private Natural Heritage Reserve and the Sossego Forest Biological Station in Simonésia and Manhuaçu. This corridor, encompassing 21 springs, has lost 70% of its original vegetation and remains threatened by human activity, where approximately 100 families live. Century-old royal palms in the urban center, particularly downtown, earned Caratinga the nickname "City of Palms."

== Environmental issues ==
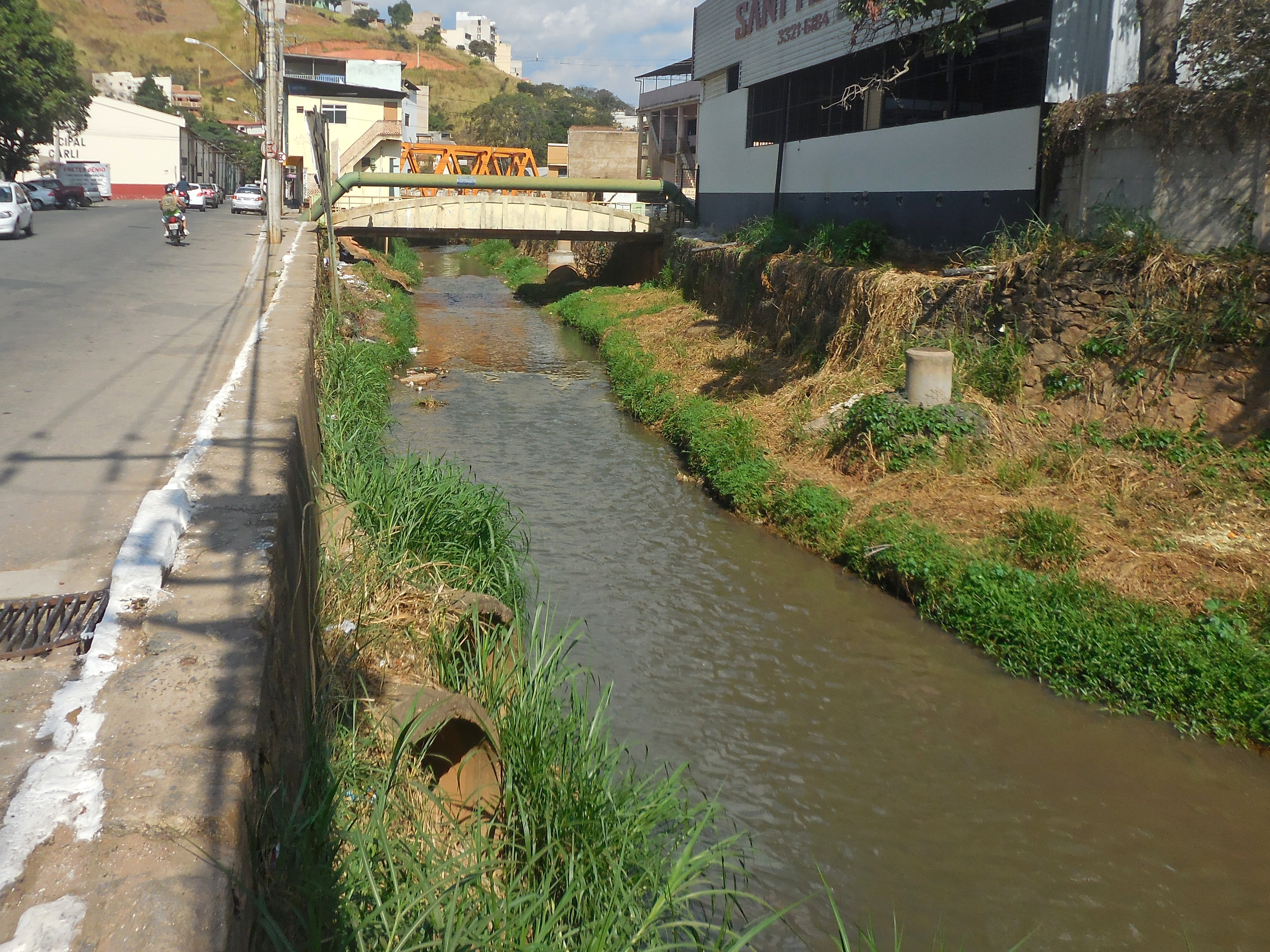
Areas occupied along the banks of the Caratinga River in Praça da Estação (Salatiel neighborhood)

Some of the main environmental problems affecting the city are floods, which during the rainy season cause significant damage in the lower and more densely populated areas along the banks of watercourses, as well as landslides on hills and slopes. The causes of these issues are often the construction of residences in irregular zones, in addition to the disposal of garbage and sewage into streams and rivers. Organizations such as the Doce River Basin Committee maintain rainfall stations and monitoring points for the water level of the Caratinga River in Caratinga and other municipalities within the river basin, alerting the population in case of potential risks. There is also a mapping of risk areas in the municipality, which serves as a foundation for other preventive measures.

On the other hand, during the dry season and prolonged Indian summers in the midst of the rainy season, wildfires are commonly reported in hills and brushlands, including within conservation units. Forest fires contribute to the destruction of native vegetation, degrade soil quality, and impair air quality, which is already compromised by a high concentration of pollutants from vehicle emissions. In the first 15 days of October 2015, Caratinga ranked seventh in Minas Gerais for the number of wildfire hotspots according to INPE, during which a three-day arson fire consumed 155 hectares of the Itaúna Environmental Protection Area. The rugged terrain hinders the Fire Department's response to such incidents. Visual pollution, meanwhile, is significant in various parts of the urban area, with a considerable presence of uncontrolled posters and advertisements affixed to walls, poles, and other open spaces.

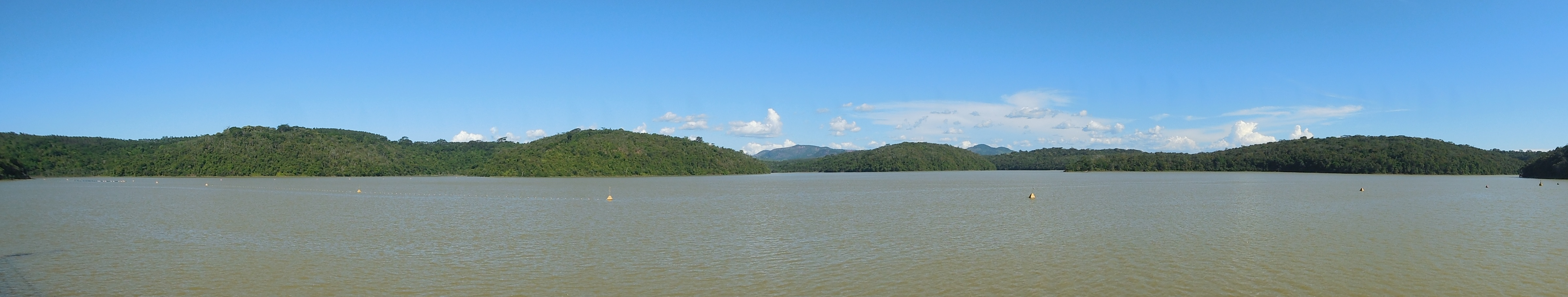
Preserved Atlantic Forest around Silvana Lagoon

== Demographics ==
Historical population
Year	Pop.	±%
1970	109,772	—
1980	110,038	+0.2%
1991	125,686	+14.2%
2000	77,789	−38.1%
2010	85,239	+9.6%
2022	87,360	+2.5%
Source: Brazilian Institute of Geography and Statistics (IBGE); Note: In the 1990s, the former districts of Entre Folhas, Imbé de Minas, Ipaba, Piedade de Caratinga, Santa Bárbara do Leste, Santa Rita de Minas, Ubaporanga, and Vargem Alegre were emancipated.

In 2022, the population was estimated at 87,360 inhabitants according to the census conducted that year by the Brazilian Institute of Geography and Statistics (IBGE). Of the total, 42,471 were men (48.62%) and 44,889 were women (51.38%). According to the same census, 73,299 inhabitants lived in the urban area (83.9%) and 14,061 in the rural area (16.1%).

Of the total population in 2022, 16,188 inhabitants (18.53%) were under 15 years old, 12,681 (14.52%) were aged 15 to 24, 19,042 (21.79%) were aged 25 to 39, 28,389 (32.49%) were aged 40 to 64, and 11,060 (12.67%) were over 65. In 2010, the life expectancy at birth was 75.2 years, and the total fertility rate per woman was 1.9.

The IBGE classifies Caratinga as a zone center B, meaning the city exerts significant influence over nearby municipalities, including Alvarenga, Bom Jesus do Galho, Córrego Novo, Dom Cavati, Entre Folhas, Imbé de Minas, Inhapim, Piedade de Caratinga, Santa Bárbara do Leste, Santa Rita de Minas, São Domingos das Dores, São Sebastião do Anta, Ubaporanga, Vargem Alegre, and Vermelho Novo.

=== Indicators and inequality ===
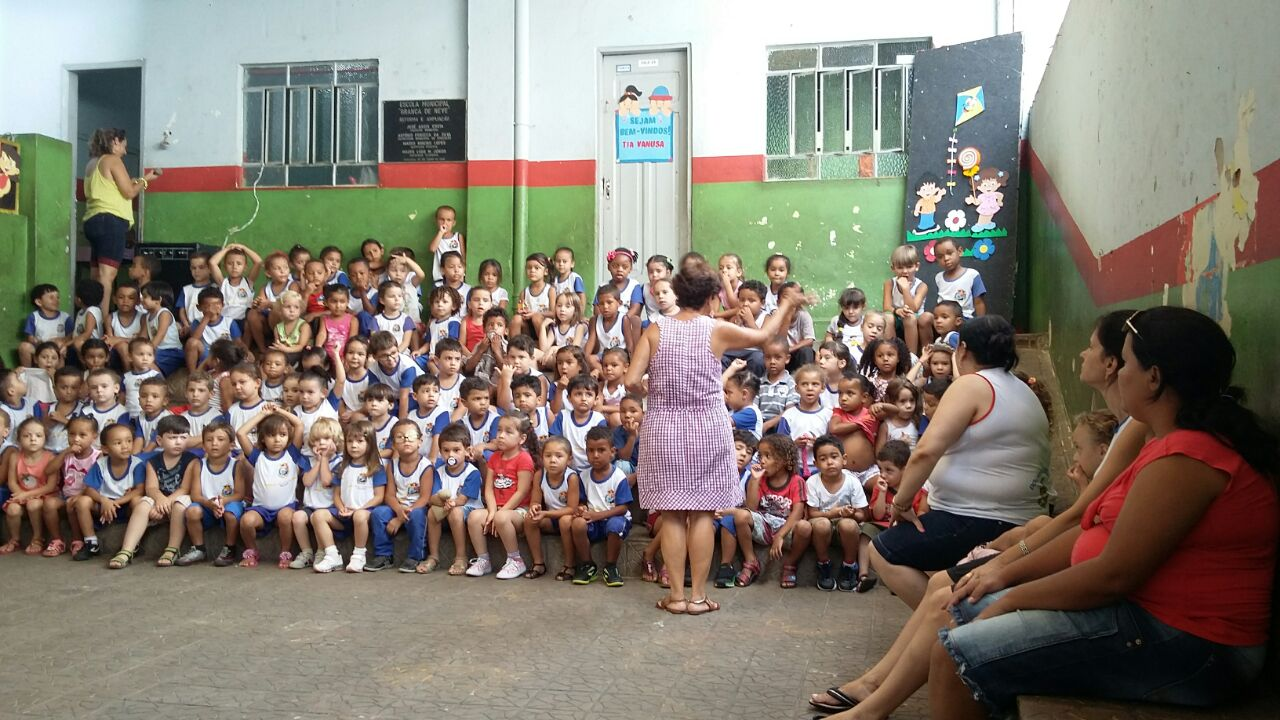
Children at a municipal school in Caratinga

The Municipal Human Development Index (HDI-M) of Caratinga is considered high by the United Nations Development Programme (UNDP), with a value of 0.706 (the 1,720th highest in Brazil and the 195th highest in Minas Gerais). The city has most indicators close to the national average according to the UNDP. Considering only the education index, the value is 0.603, the longevity index is 0.836, and the income index is 0.697. In the same year, there was a deficit of 2,296 households, the largest among the municipalities in the Vale do Aço metropolitan area in absolute numbers, while 22.7% of residences exhibited housing inadequacy.

From 2000 to 2010, the proportion of people with a per capita household income of up to half the minimum wage decreased by 44.2%. In 2010, 84.6% of the population lived above the poverty line, 9.3% were at the poverty line, and 6.1% were below it. The Gini coefficient, which measures social inequality, was 0.547, where 1.00 is the worst and 0.00 is the best. The share of the city's total income held by the wealthiest 20% of the population was 58.4%, or 16.8 times higher than that of the poorest 20%, which was 3.5%.

In 2010, Caratinga had the third-highest percentage of residences in slums among Minas Gerais municipalities, with 17.5% of its households located in areas classified as such, encompassing 15,709 inhabitants. That year, seven locations were identified as slums by the IBGE. Despite expanded access to basic infrastructure between the 1990s and 2010, the lack of public policies focused on urban growth contributes to the persistence of these issues, facilitating the emergence of irregular occupations.

=== Ethnicities and religion ===
The St. John the Baptist Cathedral

In 2022, the population was composed of 42,517 mixed-race (48.97%), 35,289 white (40.40%), 9,363 black (10.72%), 145 Asian (0.17%), and 42 Indigenous (0.05%) individuals. In 2010, considering the region of birth, 83,551 were born in the Southeast (98.02%), 889 in the Northeast (1.04%), 193 in the Central-West (0.23%), 163 in the South (0.19%), and 61 in the North (0.07%). 81,205 inhabitants were natives of Minas Gerais (95.27%), and of that total, 60,448 were born in Caratinga (70.92%). Among the 4,034 individuals born in other states, São Paulo had the highest presence with 1,023 people (1.20%), followed by Rio de Janeiro with 1,000 residents (1.17%), and Bahia with 478 residents (0.56%).

According to data from the 2010 census conducted by the IBGE, the municipal population consists of: 57,648 Catholics (67.63%), 21,461 Evangelicals (25.18%), 4,349 people without religion (5.10%), 637 Spiritists (0.75%), 472 Jehovah's Witnesses (0.55%), 42 Umbandists (0.05%), 29 Jews (0.03%), and the remaining 0.71% are distributed among other religions. According to the division established by the Catholic Church, the municipality is home to the episcopal see of the Diocese of Caratinga, which is the St. John the Baptist Cathedral. The diocese was established in December 1915 and, in 2021, comprised six deaneries covering municipalities in the region.

== Politics and administration ==
Caratinga City Hall

Municipal administration in Caratinga is carried out by the Executive and Legislative branches. The Executive branch is led by the mayor, who is supported by a cabinet of secretaries. Following the Revolution of 1930, which separated the Executive and Legislative powers, the first mayor of the municipality was Jorge Coura Filho, who served from 1931 to 1932. In the 2024 municipal elections, Giovanni Correa da Silva (Dr. Giovanni) was elected mayor, representing the Liberal Party (PL) with 33.27% of the valid votes, alongside Ronaldo Gomes de Carvalho (Ronaldo da Milla, NOVO) as deputy mayor. The Legislative branch is represented by the municipal chamber, composed of 17 councilors. The chamber is responsible for drafting and voting on laws essential to municipal administration and the Executive branch, particularly the participatory budget (budget guidelines law).

In support of the legislative process and the work of the secretariats, several active municipal councils exist, including those for the rights of children and adolescents (established in 1991), guardianship (1991), elderly rights (2002), rights of persons with disabilities (2009), and policies for women (2003). Caratinga is governed by its organic law, enacted on 21 April 1990, and hosts a judicial district of the state judiciary, classified as a special jurisdiction, which includes the municipalities of Bom Jesus do Galho, Córrego Novo, Entre Folhas, Imbé de Minas, Piedade de Caratinga, Pingo-d'Água, Santa Bárbara do Leste, Santa Rita de Minas, Ubaporanga, and Vargem Alegre. As of September 2024, the municipality had 61,103 registered voters, according to the Superior Electoral Court (TSE).

== Subdivisions ==
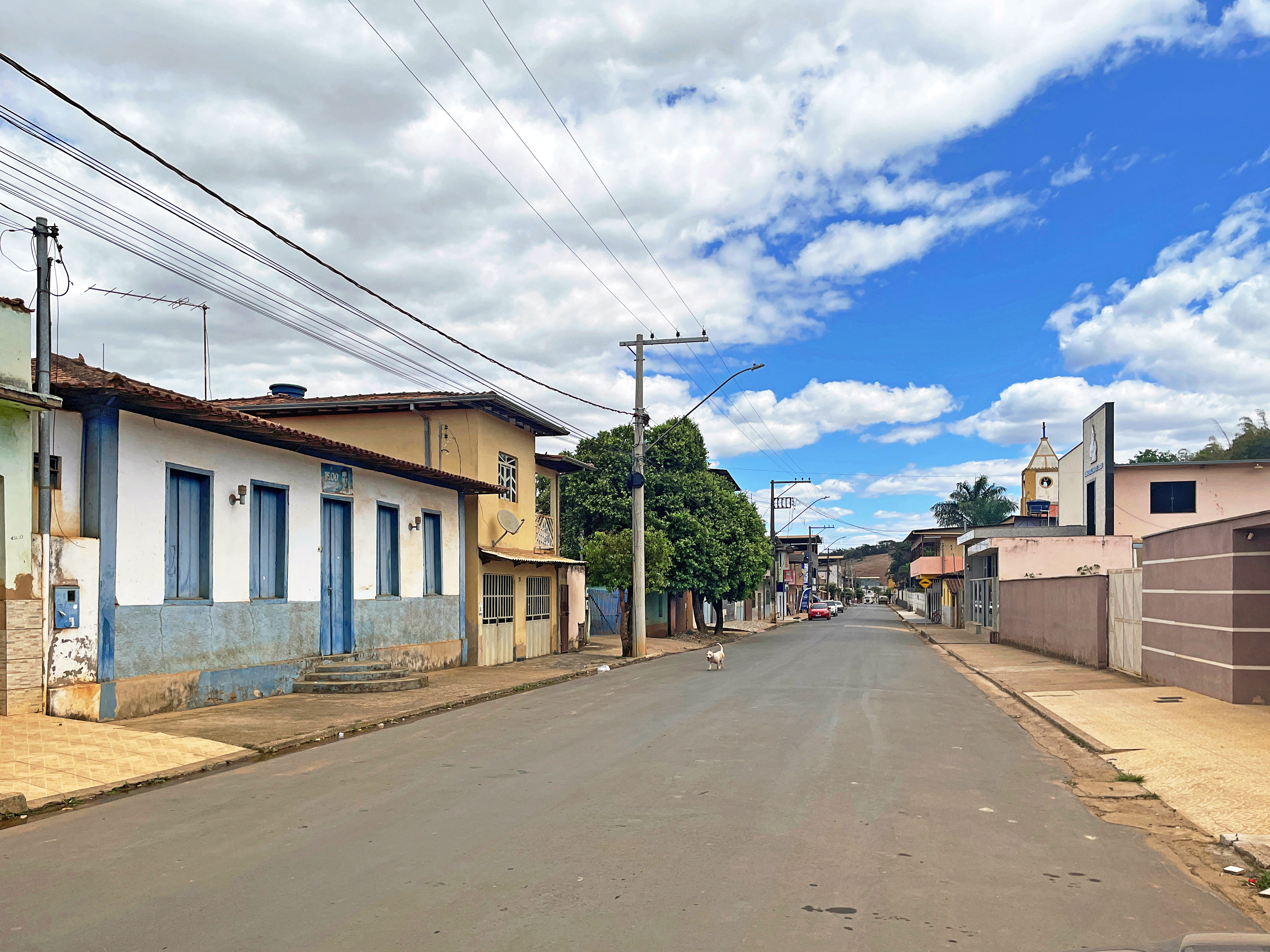
Main street of the São Cândido district

The municipality of Caratinga is divided into ten districts, in addition to the municipal seat. These districts are: Cordeiro de Minas, Dom Lara, Dom Modesto, Patrocínio de Caratinga, Santa Efigênia de Caratinga, Santa Luzia de Caratinga, Santo Antônio do Manhuaçu, Sapucaia, São Cândido, and São João do Jacutinga. The current division results from a series of changes to Caratinga's territorial configuration throughout the 20th century, which involved the separation of several districts to create new municipalities. The most recent separation occurred on 21 December 1995, when Piedade de Caratinga and Imbé de Minas were emancipated.

Urban development in areas distant from the municipal seat intensified from the 1980s onward, particularly in regions near the Vale do Aço Metropolitan Region, due to real estate saturation in the metropolitan area and easy access via the BR-458 highway. This led to the emergence of relatively recent subdivisions and settlements, such as the neighborhoods of Ilha do Rio Doce, Parques do Vale, and Porto Seguro. This region also began to attract industrial developments and leisure investments, such as clubs and resorts, primarily aimed at serving the metropolitan population. These factors contributed to Caratinga's integration into the urban expansion of the Vale do Aço Metropolitan Region, alongside the original city seat.

The original urban area of Caratinga is divided into twelve official neighborhoods, as recorded by the Brazilian Institute of Geography and Statistics (IBGE) in 2022. These are: Anápolis, Dario Grossi, Esperança, Esplanada, Limoeiro, Nossa Senhora Aparecida, Nossa Senhora das Graças, Salatiel, Santa Cruz, Santa Zita, Santo Antônio, and Zacarias Cimini. Among these, Santa Cruz was the most populous, with 6,815 inhabitants in 2022. It is noteworthy that the original municipal seat is the area with the highest concentration of irregular settlements, such as slums.

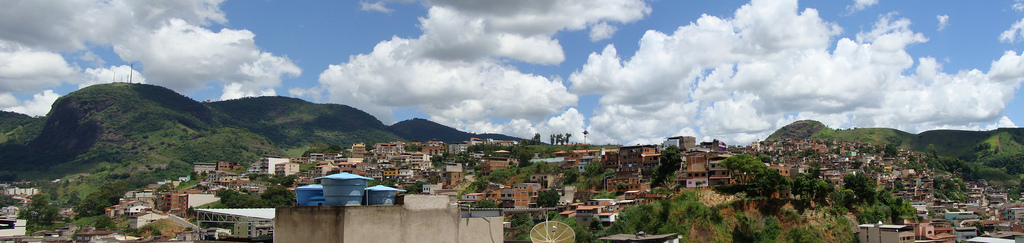
Panoramic view of inhabited hills in the city, with Pedra Itaúna on the left.

== Economy ==
In the Gross Domestic Product (GDP) of Caratinga, the industrial and service sectors stand out, though agribusiness also plays a significant role, particularly coffee production. According to 2021 data from the IBGE, the municipality's GDP at current prices was R$ 2,283,288.08. 274,854.24 came from taxes on products net of subsidies at current prices, and the per capita GDP was R$ 24,518.79. However, a considerable portion of the population commutes to other municipalities for work, given the easy access to industries in the Vale do Aço Metropolitan Region. Among Caratinga's workforce employed in other municipalities, 28.6% work in Ipatinga, 0.6% in Santana do Paraíso, 0.6% in Timóteo, 0.5% in Coronel Fabriciano, and 9.7% in other cities in the metropolitan region.

In 2022, salaries and other forms of remuneration totaled 603,017 reais, with the average monthly salary in the municipality being 1.9 minimum wages. There were 4,467 local units and 4,288 active companies. According to the IBGE, in 2010, 65.58% of households survived on less than one minimum wage per month per resident (17,483 households), 24.19% had between one and three minimum wages per person (6,449 households), 3.46% earned between three and five minimum wages (923 households), 2.28% had monthly incomes above five minimum wages (609 households), and 4.48% had no income (1,194 households).

=== Agribusiness ===
Production of beans, corn, and sugarcane (2023)
Product	Harvested area (hectares)	Production (tons)
Beans	900	670
Corn	500	1,560
Sugarcane	220	8,800

In 2021, livestock and agriculture contributed 104,000.53 reais to Caratinga's economy, while in 2010, 17.73% of the municipality's economically active population was employed in this sector. According to the IBGE, in 2023, the municipality had 40,858 cattle, 35,640 poultry, 2,226 pigs, 1,896 sheep, 1,249 horses, 398 goats, and 34 buffaloes. In the same year, the city produced 24,984 liters of milk from 9,598 cows, 117,000 dozens of chicken eggs from 9,875 hens, and 17,500 kilograms of honey from bees. In aquaculture, the main productions were tilapia (900), tambaqui (540), and tambacu (150).

In 2023, the largest cultivated areas for temporary crops were for beans (900 hectares), corn (500 hectares), and sugarcane (220 hectares), in addition to cassava, tomatoes, peanuts, sweet potatoes, watermelons, rice, garlic, pineapple, and onions. In terms of permanent crops, the highlights were coffee (10,000 hectares), bananas (350 hectares), and oranges (29 hectares), along with tangerines, lemons, avocados, mangoes, passion fruit, heart of palm, coconuts, and guavas.

Caratinga is a significant producer of mountain coffee, despite the activity experiencing a decline due to rising costs. During the harvest season, which runs from April to September, local commerce experiences increased activity. The importance of horticultural production should also be noted, with an average output of 3,000 tons per month. The city has a Central Supply Market (CEASA), where local horticultural production is sold, serving approximately 50 municipalities in the region, with 51% of the products sold at Caratinga's CEASA being produced within the municipality itself.

== Infrastructure ==
=== Healthcare ===
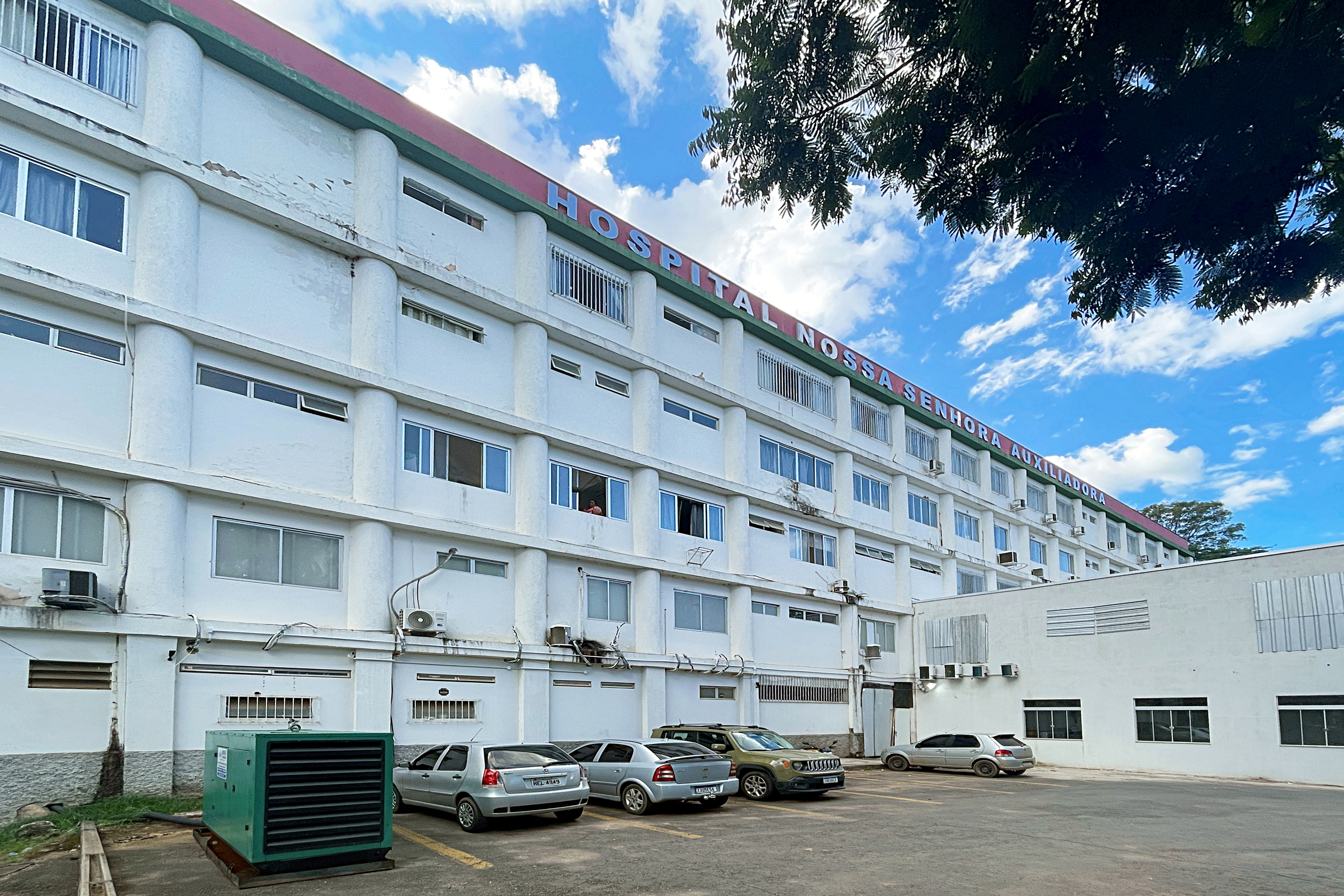
Nossa Senhora Auxiliadora Hospital

Caratinga's healthcare network, as of 2018, includes 28 primary healthcare units, two health centers, three general hospitals, and three psychosocial care centers (CAPS). The Nossa Senhora Auxiliadora Hospital, built between the 1910s and 1920s, is the city's oldest hospital. This philanthropically managed facility serves both Caratinga and surrounding municipalities. It has 119 beds, though financial constraints limited active beds to 90 as of July 2019.

The municipality has 12 cemeteries, located in the municipal seat and its districts. In 2022, 732 deaths were recorded due to diseases, with circulatory system disorders being the leading cause (29.78%), followed by tumors (16.12%). In the same year, 1,119 live births were recorded, with an infant mortality rate of 20.55 deaths per thousand live births for children under one year. Notably, in 2010, 1.96% of girls aged 10 to 17 had children.

=== Education ===
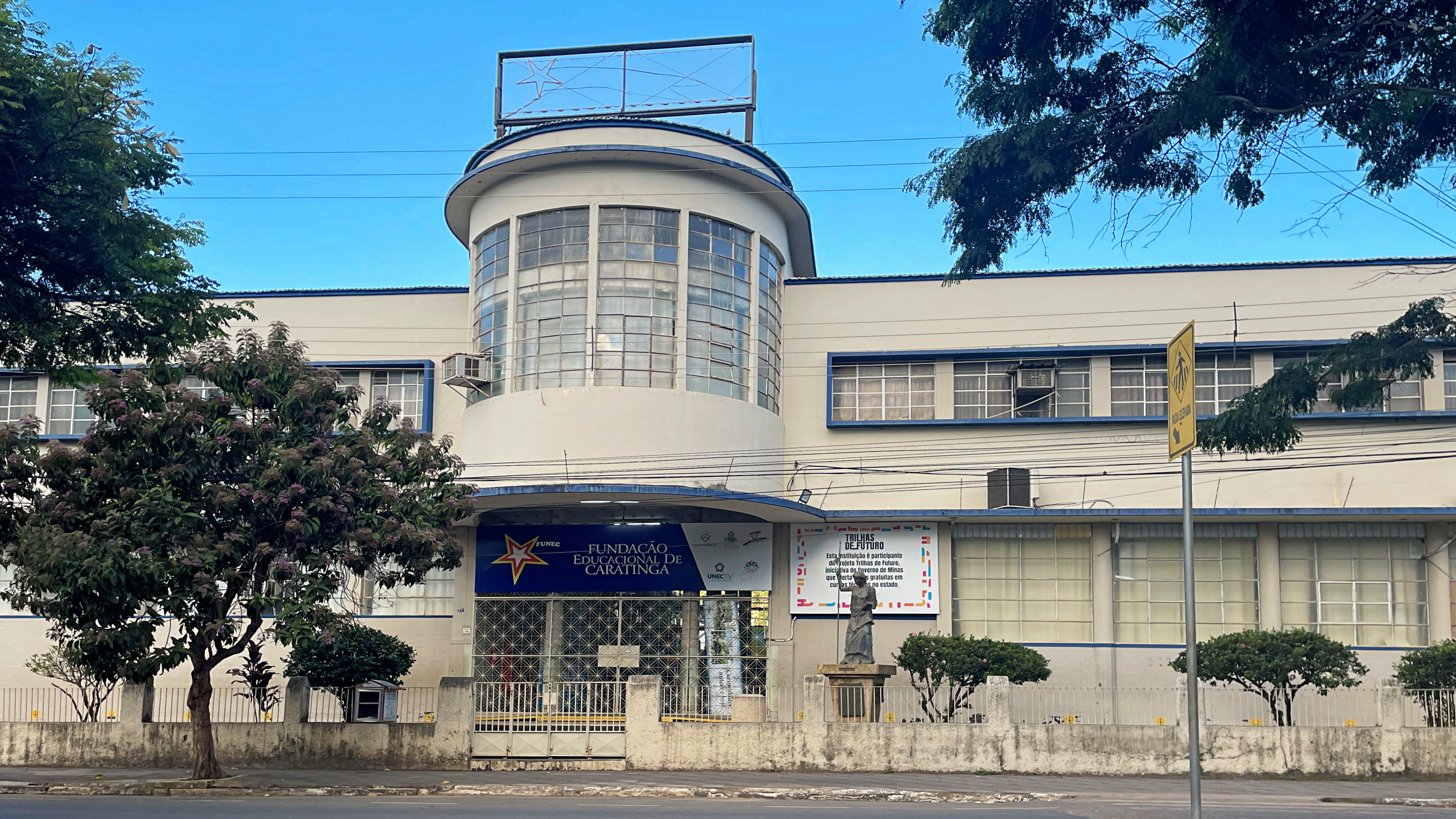
Building of the Educational Foundation of Caratinga (FUNEC), where is located the University Center of Caratinga (UNEC) and the Professor Jairo Grossi School.

In education, the average Basic Education Development Index (IDEB) for students in the early years of primary education in Caratinga's public schools was 6.4 in 2023, on a scale from 1 to 10, while the score for students in the later years was 4.9. In 2022, 30.6% of children aged 0 to 3, 84.08% of those aged 4 to 5, and 98.8% of those aged 6 to 14 were enrolled in schools, along with 80.08% of adolescents aged 15 to 17. Additionally, 24.73% of residents aged 18 to 24 and 6.04% of those 25 and older attended educational institutions.

Among residents aged 18 and older in 2022, 42.88% had not completed primary education, 13.2% had only completed primary education, 29.38% had completed secondary education, and 14.54% had completed higher education. The population aged 11 and older had an average of 8.5 years of schooling. The literacy rate for residents aged 15 and older was 93.51%, with 6.49% of this group being illiterate. In 2023, there were 16,433 enrollments in early childhood education, primary, and secondary schools in the city. Private higher education institutions, such as the Caratinga University Center (UNEC) and the Doctum Colleges in Caratinga, attract students from neighboring cities.

Education in Caratinga by numbers (2023)
Level	Enrollments	Teachers	Schools (Total)
Early childhood education	3,765	262	46
Primary education	9,785	671	55
Secondary education	2,883	375	21

=== Housing, services, and communications ===
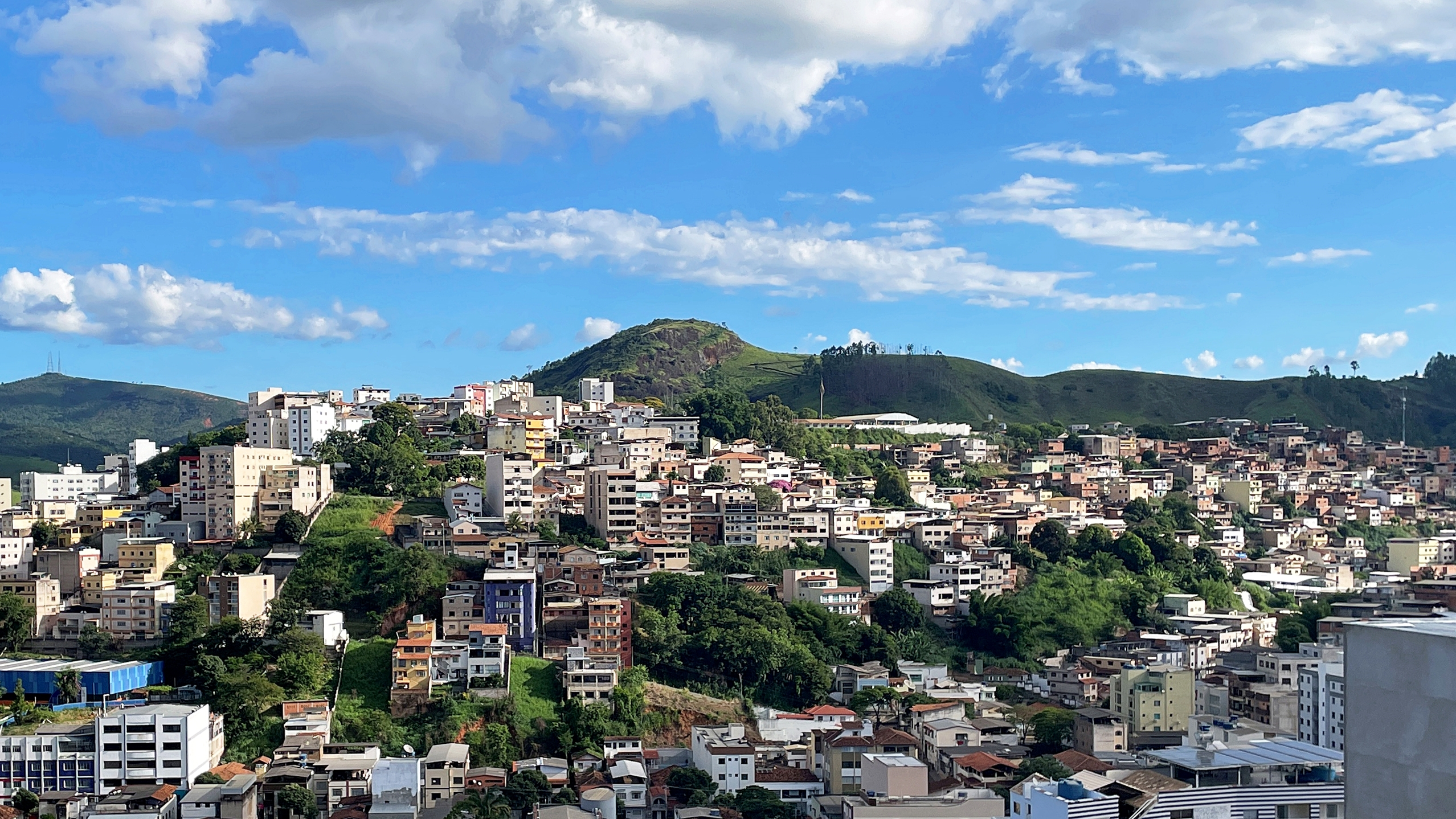
Houses on hills in the Limoeiro and Nossa Senhora Aparecida neighborhoods

In 2022, Caratinga had 32,668 occupied permanent private households. Of these, 22,767 were houses (69.69%), 9,567 were apartments (29.29%), 317 were houses in gated communities or condominiums (0.67%), eleven were tenements (0.03%), and six were degraded or unfinished structures (0.02%). Of the total occupied households, 20,924 were owned (64.06%), with 19,546 fully paid and 1,379 under acquisition; 9,593 were rented (29.37%); 1,935 were loaned or provided (5.92%); and 209 were occupied through other means (0.64%).

Water supply and sewage collection services are managed by the Minas Gerais Sanitation Company (Copasa). In 2022, according to IBGE, 79.37% of households had access to the general water network as their primary supply, and 99.92% had exclusive-use bathrooms. Regarding sanitation, 77.66% of households were served by the general or stormwater sewage network. Much of the city's water supply comes from the Lage stream and is treated at a conventional treatment plant. However, a sewage treatment plant under construction remains incomplete, and collected sewage is still discharged directly into urban watercourses.

Electricity is supplied by the Minas Gerais Energy Company (Cemig), which serves much of the state. In 2003, there were 26,554 consumers, with 60,408,648 kWh of energy consumed. In 2010, 99.7% of households had access to the electrical network, according to IBGE. Regarding waste management, 88.91% of households were served by waste collection services in 2022, with waste directed to a landfill located approximately 7.5 km from downtown Caratinga, producing an average of 38 tons of waste daily in 2012. The municipality of Ipatinga disposed of its waste in an open-air dump in Caratinga's Cordeiro de Minas district until 1996, when it was covered. The site was closed in 2003 and designated for preservation.

In 2010, 46.84% of the population had only mobile phones, 7.99% had only landline phones, 24.95% had both, and 20.22% had neither. The area code (DDD) is 033, and the postal code (CEP) ranges from 35300-001 to 35322-999. On 10 November 2008, Caratinga gained access to number portability, along with other municipalities sharing the same DDD, allowing users to switch operators without changing their phone numbers. Postal services are provided by Correios agencies in the urban area and districts. Notable local radio stations include Rádio Sociedade Caratinga, the city's first major broadcaster, founded on 21 September 1948, and Rádio Cidade. The primary local news outlet is the Diário de Caratinga newspaper.

=== Security and crime ===
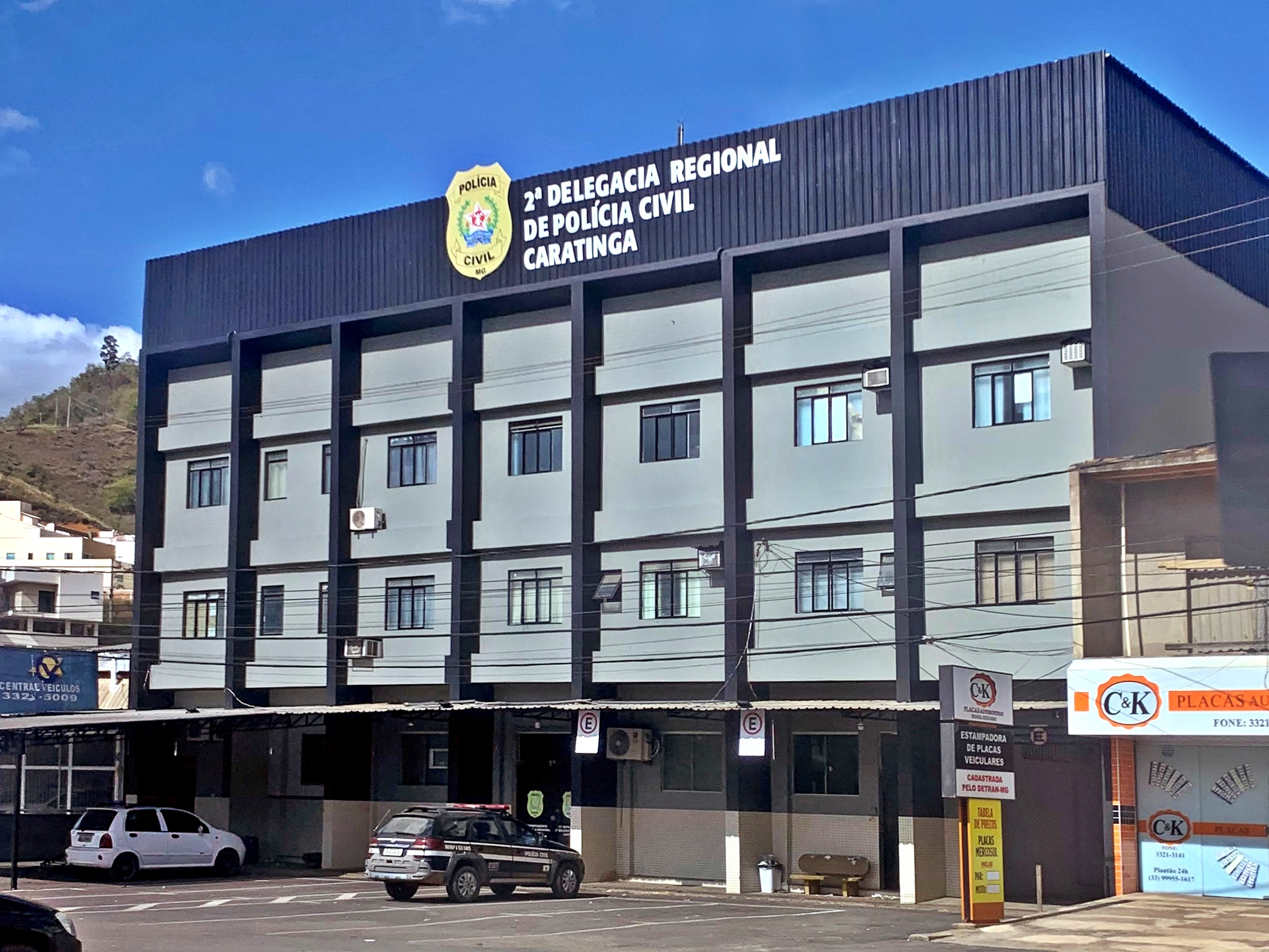
Caratinga Civil Police Station

Public security in Caratinga is managed by various agencies. The Minas Gerais Military Police is a state force that handles most policing duties, including bank, environmental, prison, school, and event patrols, as well as community engagement initiatives. It operates a battalion in the municipality, established in June 2015. The Minas Gerais Civil Police focuses on investigating crimes and infractions and is represented by the Caratinga Regional Police Station. The city is also served by a platoon of the Fire Department and a civil defense unit under municipal authority.

In 2013, the Military Police recorded 154 violent crimes, including 121 robberies, 15 attempted homicides, eleven homicides, five rapes, and two kidnappings with false imprisonment, resulting in a violent crime rate of 171.92 per 100,000 inhabitants. In 2022, 17 homicides were recorded, a decrease from 18 in 2021, with 2009 being the worst year between 2000 and 2022, with 21 homicides. Most homicides are linked to drug trafficking, which also contributes to other crimes. Many offenders are sent to the local prison, which has experienced vandalism and riots.

=== Transportation ===
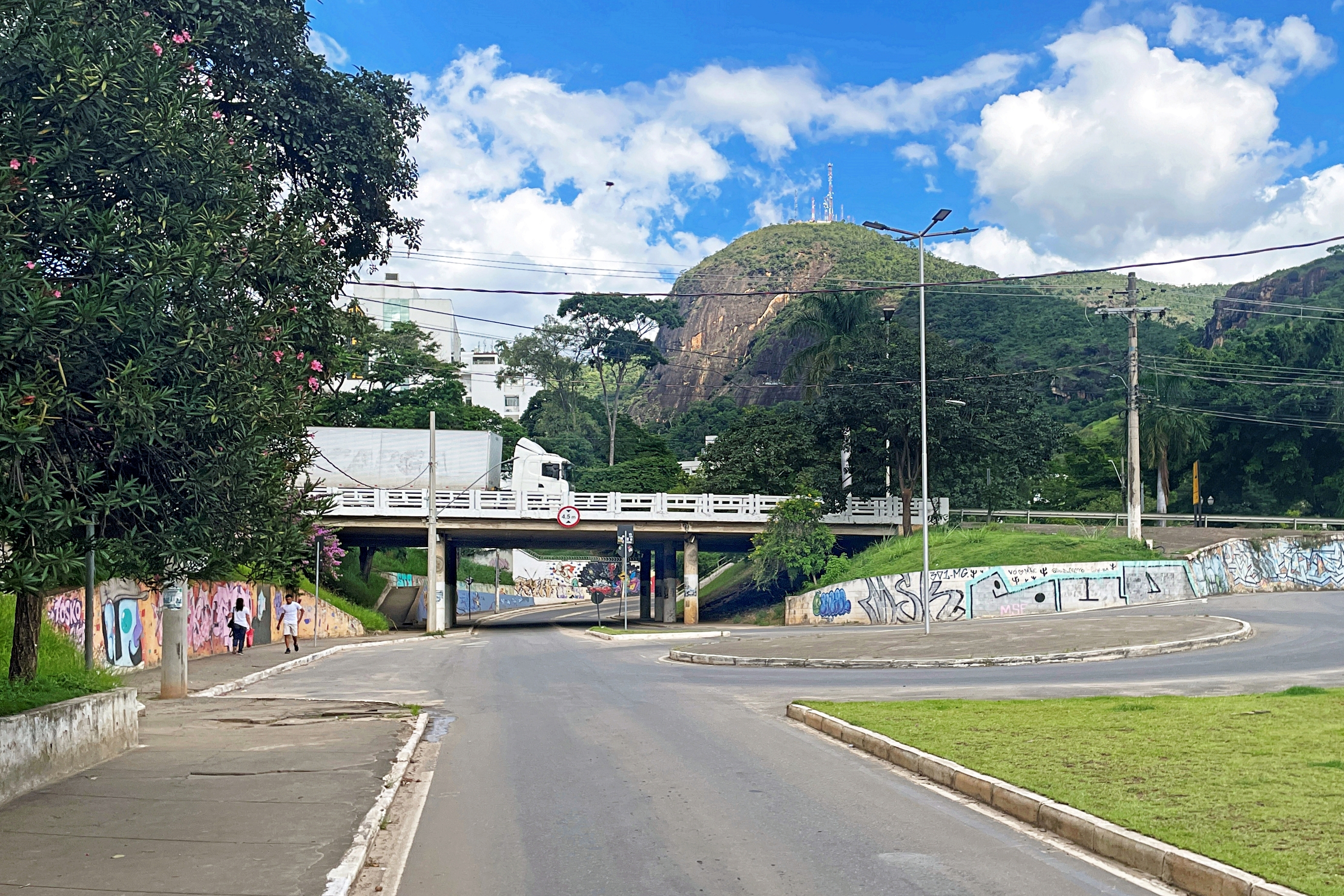
BR-116 over the Maria Catarina Cimini Avenue

Caratinga was once served by the now-defunct Leopoldina Railway, which provided passenger transport to the city and some rural areas until the mid-1970s. Initially operational in 1931 with regular trips between Caratinga and Rio de Janeiro, the railway fragmented over time, with passenger services limited to Ubá in its final years. The rail line through the municipality was dismantled in the 1980s. In Minas Gerais, the decline of railways was largely due to their replacement by highways, driven by the growing vehicle fleet and the privatization of many rail lines for freight transport.

Although rail transport is no longer available, the nearest passenger terminal for those coming from the state capital is the Intendente Câmara Railway Station on the Vitória-Minas Railway (EFVM), located in Ipatinga. The municipality is served by BR-116 (Rio–Bahia Highway), which runs through the urban area; BR-458, connecting BR-116 to the Vale do Aço Metropolitan Region via the northern municipal boundary; BR-474, linking Caratinga to Ipanema, Aimorés, and the state of Espírito Santo; MG-329, providing access to Bom Jesus do Galho and Ponte Nova; and MG-425, connecting to Entre Folhas; along with secondary and connecting roads. The Carlos Alberto de Mattos Bus Terminal (New Bus Station) provides intermunicipal public transportation.

In 2023, the municipal vehicle fleet totaled 50,541, including 23,183 cars, 15,051 motorcycles, 4,511 pickup trucks, 2,923 mopeds, 1,632 trucks, 1,233 vans, 525 trailers, 504 buses, 362 utility vehicles, 159 semi-trailers, 140 minibuses, 138 tractor-trucks, 135 scooters, 32 tricycles, eight sidecars, four wheeled tractors, and one classified as another type of vehicle. The urban area occasionally experiences traffic congestion due to increased vehicle flow, and parking availability near commercial hubs is often limited. Proposals to adjust and create parking spaces are being considered and implemented. Public transportation is operated by Viação Riodoce, which runs urban and inter-district lines. The Ubaporanga Airport, located in the neighboring municipality of Ubaporanga, serves Caratinga with a 1,080-meter-long and 23-meter-wide paved and marked runway, but operations are restricted to daytime and small aircraft.

== Culture ==
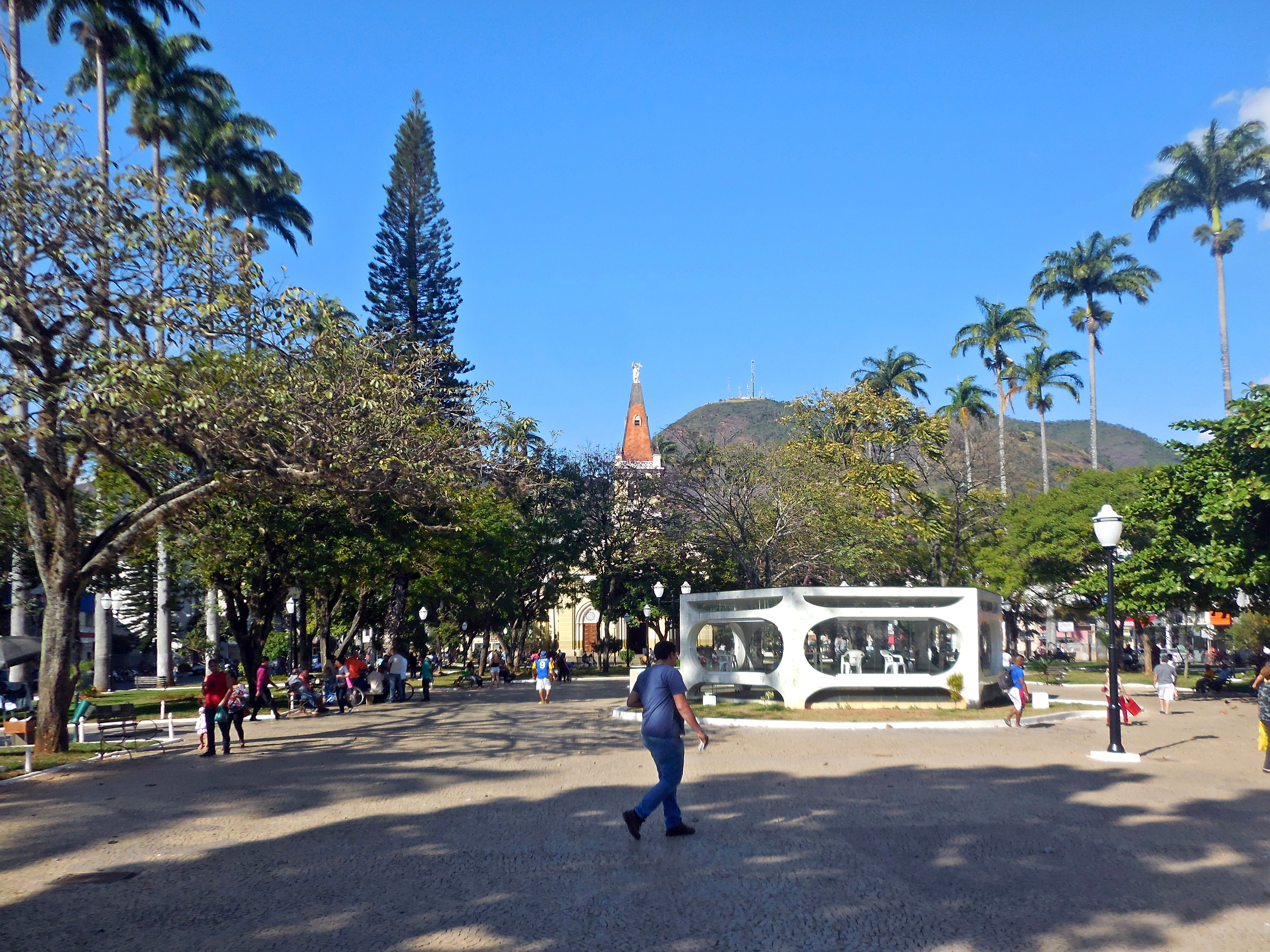
Cesário Alvim Square with Saint John the Baptist Cathedral and Pedra Itaúna in the background

Caratinga has a municipal culture council, which serves advisory, deliberative, regulatory, and supervisory roles, and a heritage preservation council, which is advisory and deliberative, both with equal representation. Municipal legislation protects both tangible and intangible cultural heritage, managed by a dedicated municipal culture secretariat. For 2024, the municipality scored 1.80 out of 4 for cultural policies in the Cultural ICMS calculation, with a total score of 11.55, factoring in conservation, expenditure, and the number of registered or protected assets.

As of January 2018, the following tangible assets were designated as municipal cultural heritage: the former Caratinga Railway Station; the Agenor Ludgero Alves Mansion, known as the Casarão das Artes; the São João Church, the first parish church; Cesário Alvim Square; the St. John the Baptist Cathedral; the Episcopal Palace; Cine Brasil; Princesa Isabel State School; the Ronaldinho Calazans Bandstand in Cesário Alvim Square; Pedra Itaúna; the Desembargador Faria e Sousa Courthouse, the former Caratinga County Courthouse; Bom Será Waterfall; and the Carmelites’ Stained Glass at the Hélio Amaral Institute. Intangible heritage included the Santa Cecília Musical Band and the São João Batista Choir.

=== Cultural events and spaces ===
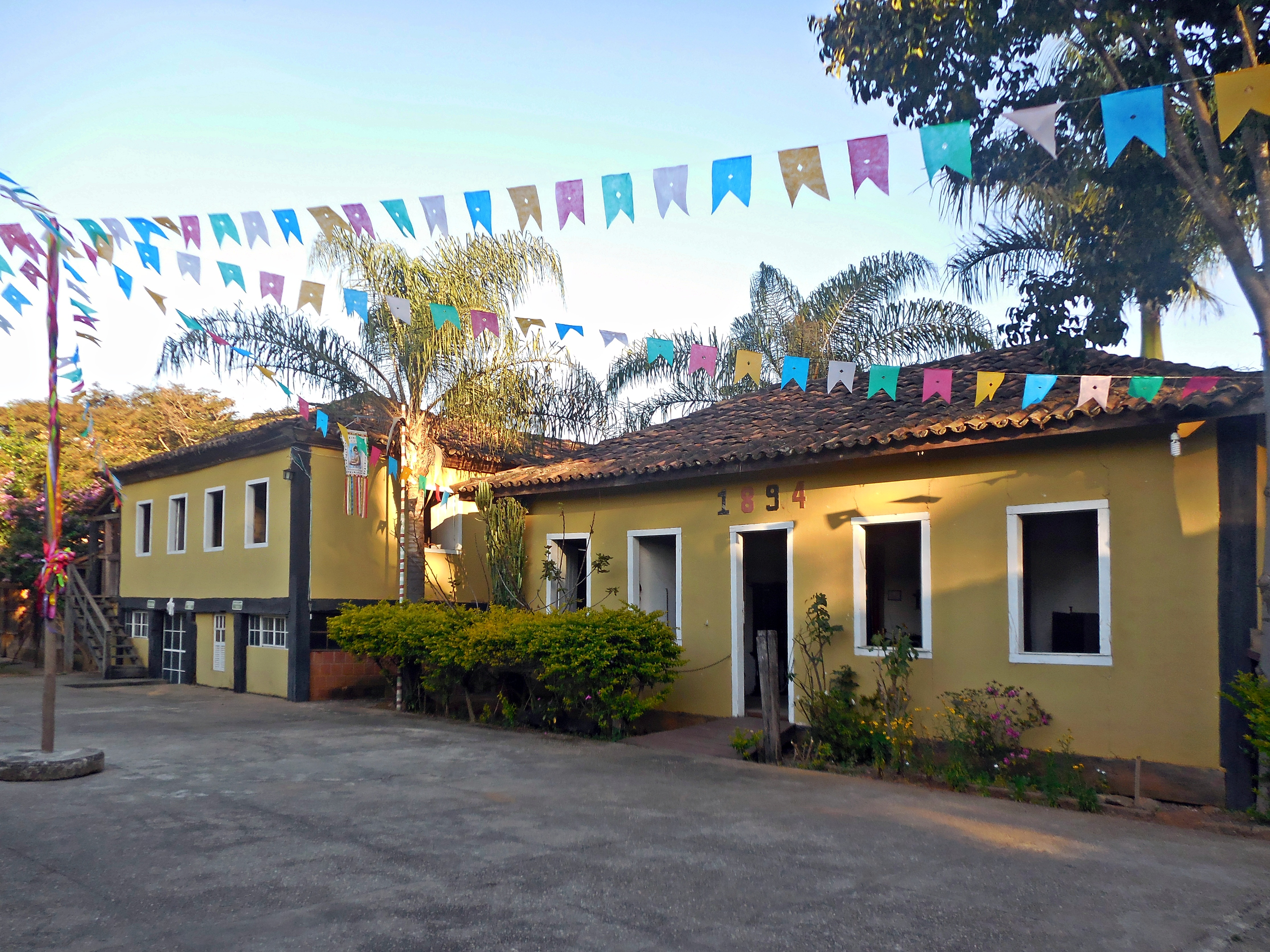
The mansion of the Hélio Amaral Institute, dating from 1894, where the museum is located.

The city hosts artistic groups for popular cultural expressions, dance, capoeira, a cineclub, musical bands, a choir, and a literary association, as reported by IBGE in 2012. The Caratinga Academy of Letters, founded on 18 November 1983, brings together notable figures in the municipality's cultural and literary spheres. The Cineclub project involves screening alternative films in schools or public spaces for the community, both in the city and its districts, through a mobile cinema initiative supported by the municipal government. Occasionally, the municipality organizes and funds musical, theatrical, or dance performances as part of cultural or artistic festivals and events.

The Folia de Reis Festival, June festivals, and the city's anniversary celebrations in June, featuring civic ceremonies, sports competitions, and musical performances, are prominent cultural events in the municipality. The Caratinga carnival, which once included parades of carnival blocks and samba schools, ended in the 1980s. Handicrafts are one of the most vibrant forms of cultural expression in Caratinga. The IBGE reports that the primary handicraft activities are embroidery and the preservation of traditional cuisine.

Among the cultural spaces dedicated to preserving popular traditions, the municipality maintains public libraries, museums, stadiums, sports facilities, recreational clubs, associations, and a municipal public archive, as reported by IBGE in 2012. The Ziraldo Culture House, inaugurated in November 2009, houses a collection by the cartoonist Ziraldo, a Caratinga native, and hosts exhibitions, artistic performances, and other cultural activities. The Hélio Amaral Institute, a non-profit founded in 2004 and declared a public utility in 2007, manages a museum that organizes community exhibitions and occasionally partners with the municipality to facilitate school visits. The House of Arts, built in 1893, hosts exhibitions, artistic, cultural, and academic activities, lectures, and musical and theatrical performances, and houses a collection by journalist, playwright, illustrator, and writer Millôr Fernandes.

Caratinga is the birthplace of several artists who have achieved regional or national recognition, including poet Marilene Godinho, singer Agnaldo Timóteo, writer and publicist Maxs Portes, the former Banda Mil (the region's most successful band in the 1990s), journalist Miriam Leitão, writer and journalist Ruy Castro, and cartoonist Ziraldo, who created the popular children's book series O Menino Maluquinho, among other notable works.

=== Landmarks and attractions ===
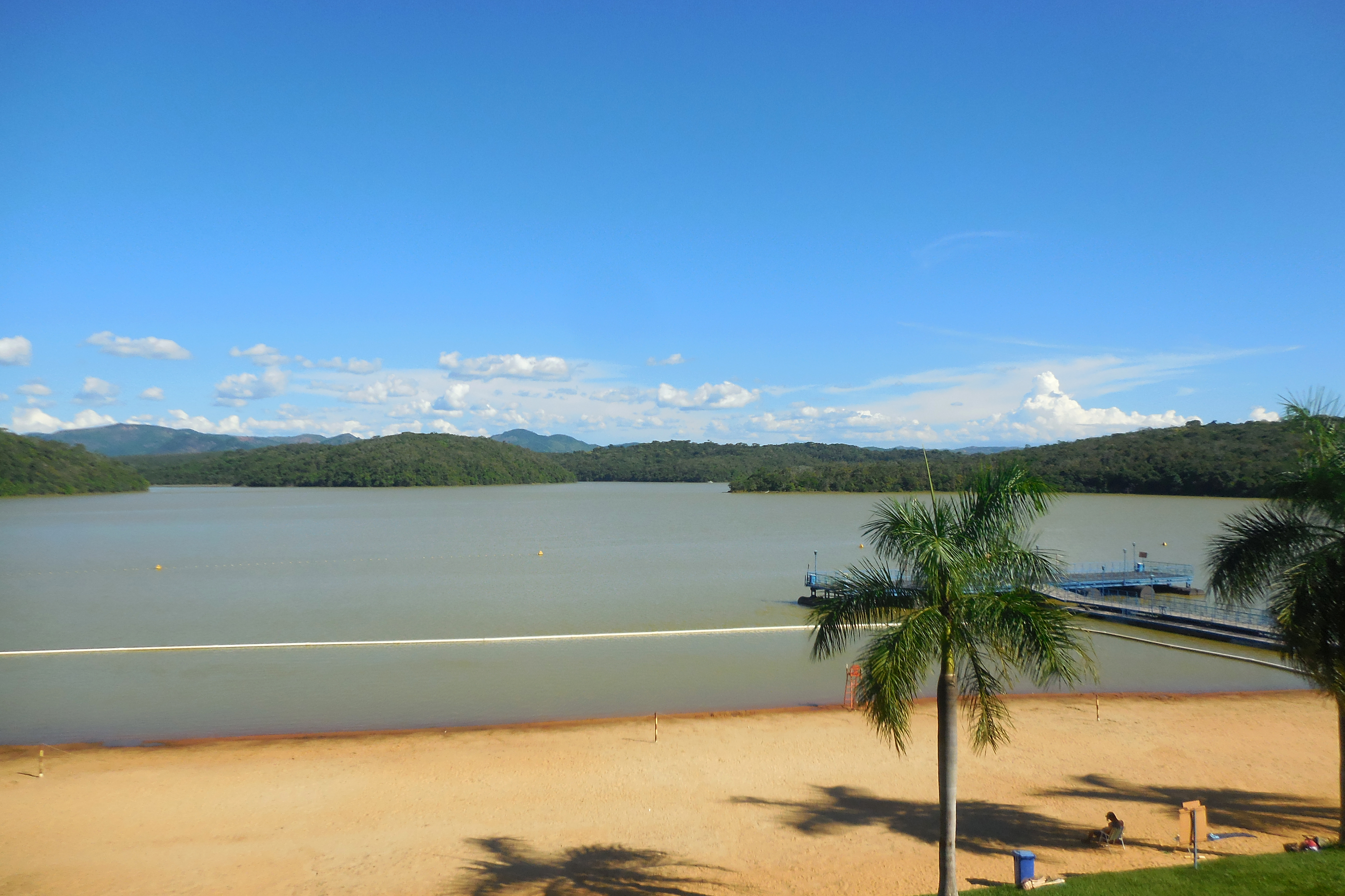
View of Lagoa Silvana

Caratinga is part of the Muriqui Tourist Route, established in 2009 by the Minas Gerais State Tourism Secretariat to promote tourism in participating cities. Key natural attractions include the Feliciano Miguel Abdala Private Natural Heritage Reserve, one of Minas Gerais’ main remnants of the Atlantic Forest, home to the northern muriqui, the largest primate in the Americas. The reserve supports scientific research from various countries and is open for ecotourism. Centuries-old farms and rural properties facilitate rural tourism. The municipality features several waterfalls suitable for bathing, as well as lakes, notably Lagoa Silvana and Lagoa do Piau. Lagoa Silvana, near Ipatinga, offers a recreational area with trails, beaches, restaurants, and camping facilities.

Located close to the urban area, Pedra Itaúna offers scenic views and is popular for extreme sports. Other notable urban landmarks include the 19th-century Cesário Alvim Square and the São João Batista Cathedral, which was built around 1930, and its bandstand designed by Oscar Niemeyer in 1980; the Perpetual Adoration Sanctuary, used for Catholic prayers and worship; the Episcopal Palace, the residence of the Diocese of Caratinga’s bishop, inaugurated on 28 April 1944; and the Princesa Isabel State School, founded on 24 August 1909, with its building retaining its original features.

=== Sports ===
Caratinga offers various facilities and equipment for sports activities. The municipality supports professional athletes by providing subsidies for participation in regional tournaments across multiple sports, including track and field, cycling, jiu-jitsu, taekwondo, and sport shooting, with athletes achieving notable results in national and international competitions. The municipality's schools host student games, fostering sports competitions among participating institutions. There are also physical activity programs for the elderly and individuals with hypertension and diabetes. The Pedra Itaúna offers ideal conditions for free flying.

Among football clubs, the Esporte Clube Caratinga, founded in 1917 by former mayor Euclides Etiene Arreguy, is one of the city's most traditional teams. The América Futebol Clube, established in 1959, achieved success in local amateur championships during the 1980s. The Doutor Euclides Etienne Arreguy Stadium, also known as Doutor Maninho, is the home of Esporte Clube Caratinga and has a capacity of approximately 7,000 people.

=== Holidays ===
Caratinga observes three municipal holidays and eight national holidays, in addition to optional holidays. The municipal holidays are the Feast of Corpus Christi, celebrated on June 19 in 2025; the city's anniversary, celebrated on June 24; and the Feast of the Immaculate Conception, celebrated on December 8.

== See also ==
- List of municipalities in Minas Gerais

== Bibliography ==
- Centro Universitário Católica do Leste de Minas Gerais (Unileste) (2014). "Região Metropolitana do Vale do Aço - diagnóstico final (volume 1)" [Metropolitan Region of Vale do Aço - final diagnosis (volume 1)] (PDF). Plano Diretor de Desenvolvimento Integrado (in Portuguese). 1: 1–269. Archived from the original (PDF) on March 3, 2016.
- Centro Universitário Católica do Leste de Minas Gerais (Unileste) (2014). "Região Metropolitana do Vale do Aço - diagnóstico final (volume 2)" [Metropolitan Region of Vale do Aço - final diagnosis (volume 2)] (PDF). Plano Diretor de Desenvolvimento Integrado (in Portuguese). 2: 270–494. Archived from the original (PDF) on November 17, 2015.
- Centro Universitário Católica do Leste de Minas Gerais (Unileste) (2014). "Região Metropolitana do Vale do Aço - diagnóstico final (volume 3)" [Metropolitan Region of Vale do Aço - final diagnosis (volume 3)] (PDF). Plano Diretor de Desenvolvimento Integrado (in Portuguese). 3: 495–825. Archived from the original (PDF) on February 2, 2016.
