= St. John the Baptist Cathedral, Caratinga =

St. John the Baptist Cathedral
- Catedral São João Batista
- St. John the Baptist Cathedral, Caretinga
- St. John the Baptist Cathedral
- 19°47′24″S 42°08′22″W
- Location: Caratinga
- Country: Brazil
- Denomination: Roman Catholic Church

The St. John the Baptist Cathedral (Portuguese: Catedral São João Batista) Also Caratinga Cathedral It is a Catholic church located in Caratinga, in the state of Minas Gerais in Brazil. Dedicated to Saint John the Baptist is also the Diocese of Caratinga.

It is located on the Plaza Cesário Alvim, which houses a parish that has two chapels dependent on it: the chapel of St. Sebastian and the chapel of Our Lady of Aparecida.

The Parish of St. John the Baptist was created on December 1, 1873 and was formally established on October 20, 1877. When it was created, the parish was subordinate to the then diocese of Mariana. In 1880, began to construct the new church of St. John the Baptist.

On December 10, 1915, with the creation of the diocese of Caratinga, the temple was elevated to the status of a cathedral.

== See also ==
- Roman Catholicism in Brazil
- St. John the Baptist Cathedral
