= Itanhomi =

- Municipality
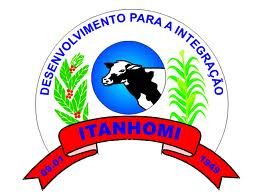
- Coat of arms

- Location in Brazil
- Coordinates: 19°10′19″S 41°51′54″W
- Country: Brazil
- Region: Southeast
- State: Minas Gerais
- Mesoregion: Vale do Rio Doce
- Established: 01/01/1949

Government
  - Mayor: Raimundo Francisco Penaforte

Area
  - Total: 188.506 sq mi (488.229 km^{2})

Population (2022 Census)
  - Total: 11,128
  - Estimate (2025): 11,264
- Time zone: UTC−3 (BRT)

Itanhomi is a municipality in the state of Minas Gerais in the Southeast region of Brazil.

== History ==
Legend spoke about the existence of an Indian chief named Queiroga. Queiroga is actually a native plant that existed on the banks of Ribeirão forest, currently Ribeirão Queiroga, from which the name is derived. There were nomadic Indians, the Botocudos (a subdivision of the Aimorés Tribe), in this region.

== See also ==
- List of municipalities in Minas Gerais
