= Santa Bárbara do Leste =

- Municipality
- Facade of the Saint Barbara Matriz Church

- Location in Brazil
- Coordinates: 19°58′40″S 42°08′24″W
- Country: Brazil
- Region: Southeast
- State: Minas Gerais
- Mesoregion: Vale do Rio Doce

Population (2020)
  - Total: 8,181
- Time zone: UTC−3 (BRT)

Santa Bárbara do Leste is a municipality in the state of Minas Gerais in the Southeast region of Brazil.

== See also ==
- List of municipalities in Minas Gerais
