= Entre Folhas =

Coordinates: 19°37′S 42°14′W

- Municipality
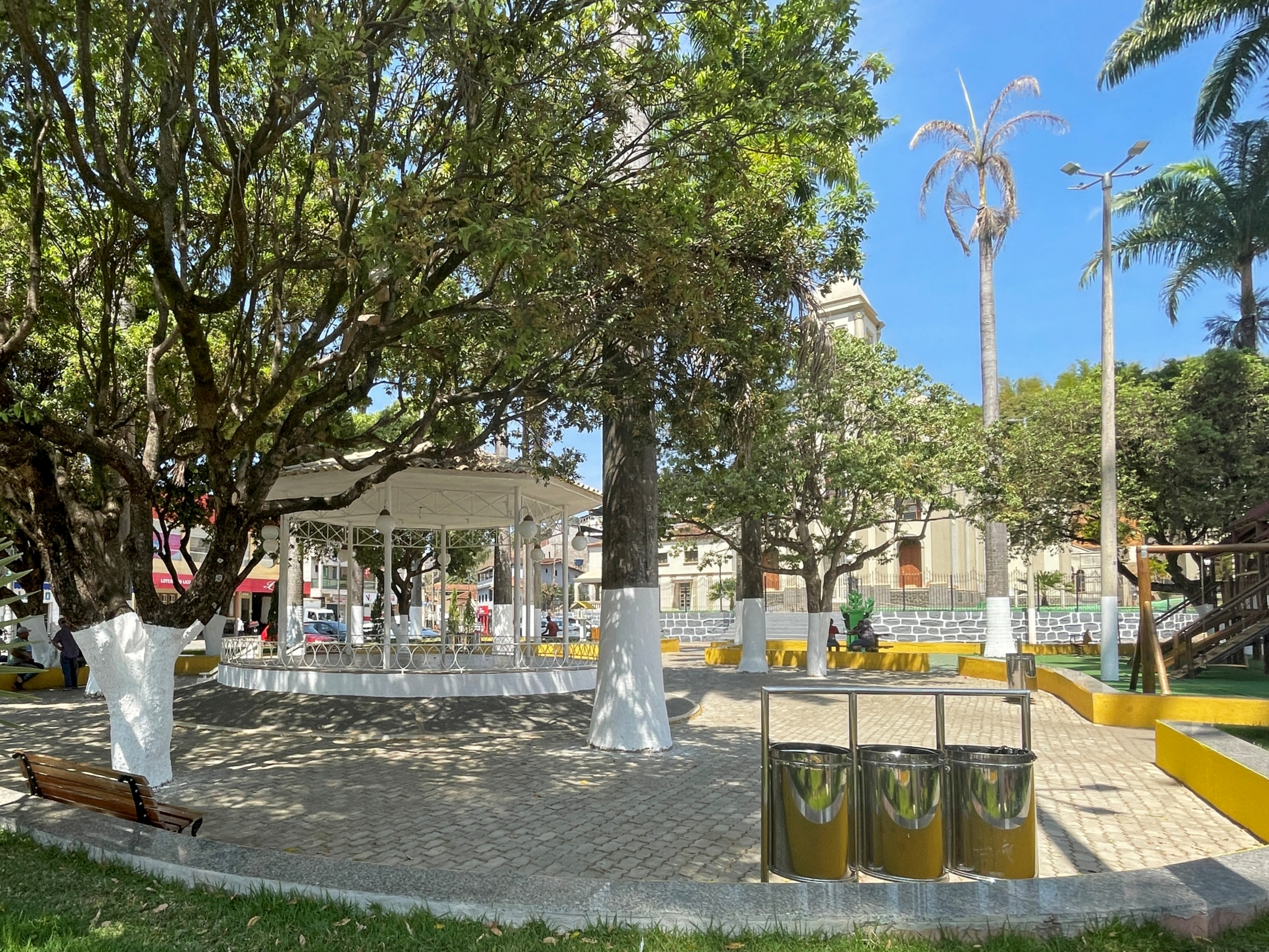
- Padre José Lanzillotti Square with the Our Lady of the Rosary Matriz Church in the background

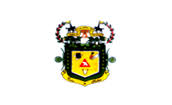
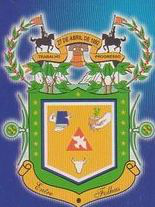
- Flag Coat of arms
- Interactive map of Entre Folhas
- Country: Brazil
- Region: Southeast
- State: Minas Gerais
- Mesoregion: Vale do Rio Doce

Population (2020)
  - Total: 5,377
- Time zone: UTC−3 (BRT)

Entre Folhas is a municipality in the state of Minas Gerais in the Southeast region of Brazil.

== See also ==
- List of municipalities in Minas Gerais
