= São Sebastião do Anta =

- Municipality
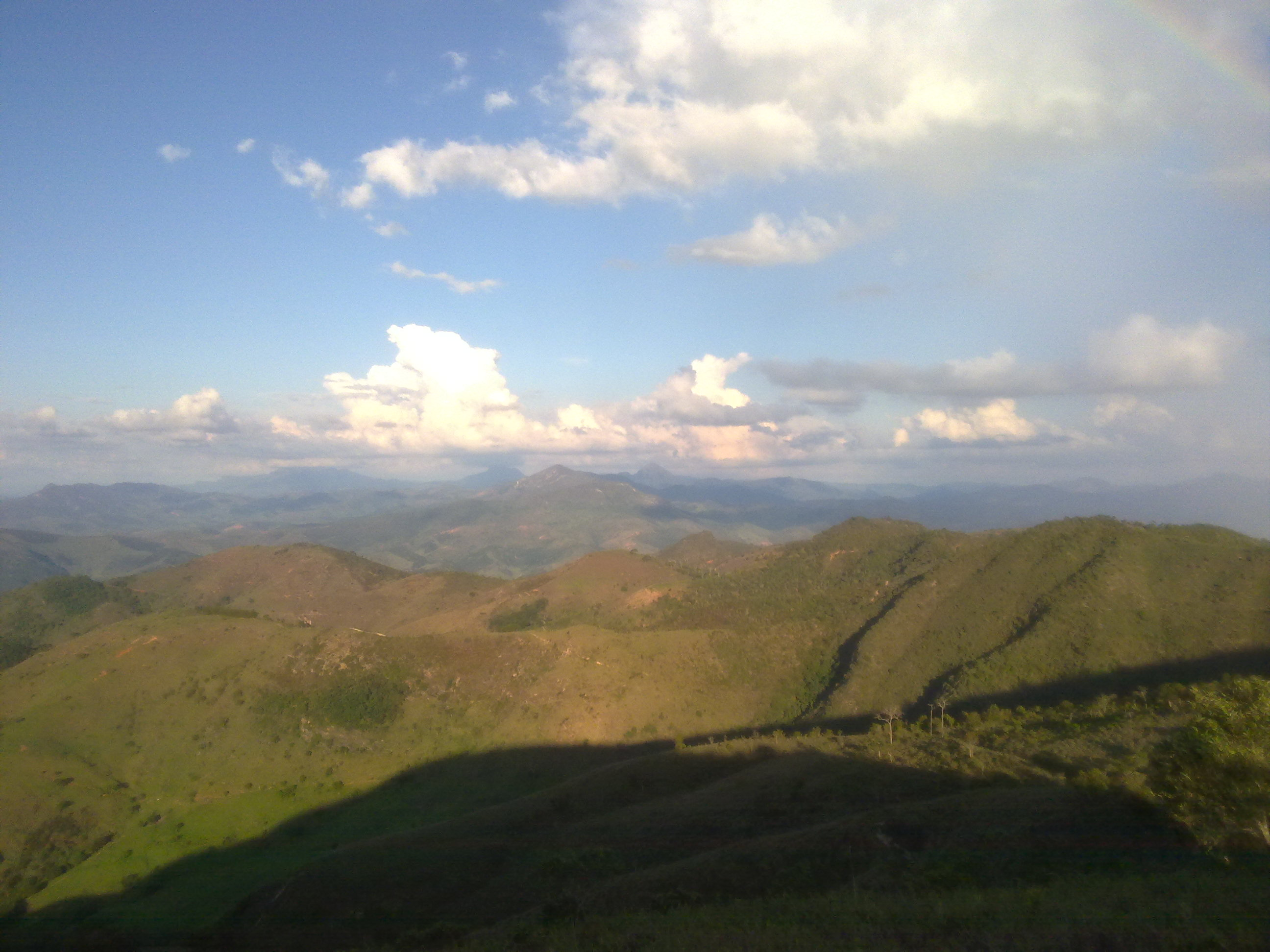
- Montanhas em São Sebastião do Anta

- Location in Brazil
- Coordinates: 19°29′52″S 41°59′2″W
- Country: Brazil
- Region: Southeast
- State: Minas Gerais
- Mesoregion: Vale do Rio Doce

Population (2020)
  - Total: 6,627
- Time zone: UTC−3 (BRT)

São Sebastião do Anta is a municipality in the state of Minas Gerais in the Southeast region of Brazil.

== See also ==
- List of municipalities in Minas Gerais
