= São Domingos das Dores =

- Municipality
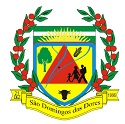
- Coat of arms

- Location in Brazil
- Coordinates: 19°31′37″S 42°00′39″W
- Country: Brazil
- Region: Southeast
- State: Minas Gerais
- Mesoregion: Vale do Rio Doce

Population (2020)
  - Total: 5,658
- Time zone: UTC−3 (BRT)

São Domingos das Dores is a municipality in the state of Minas Gerais in the Southeast region of Brazil.

== See also ==
- List of municipalities in Minas Gerais
