= Imbé de Minas =

Coordinates: 19.5969°S 41.9708°W

- Municipality
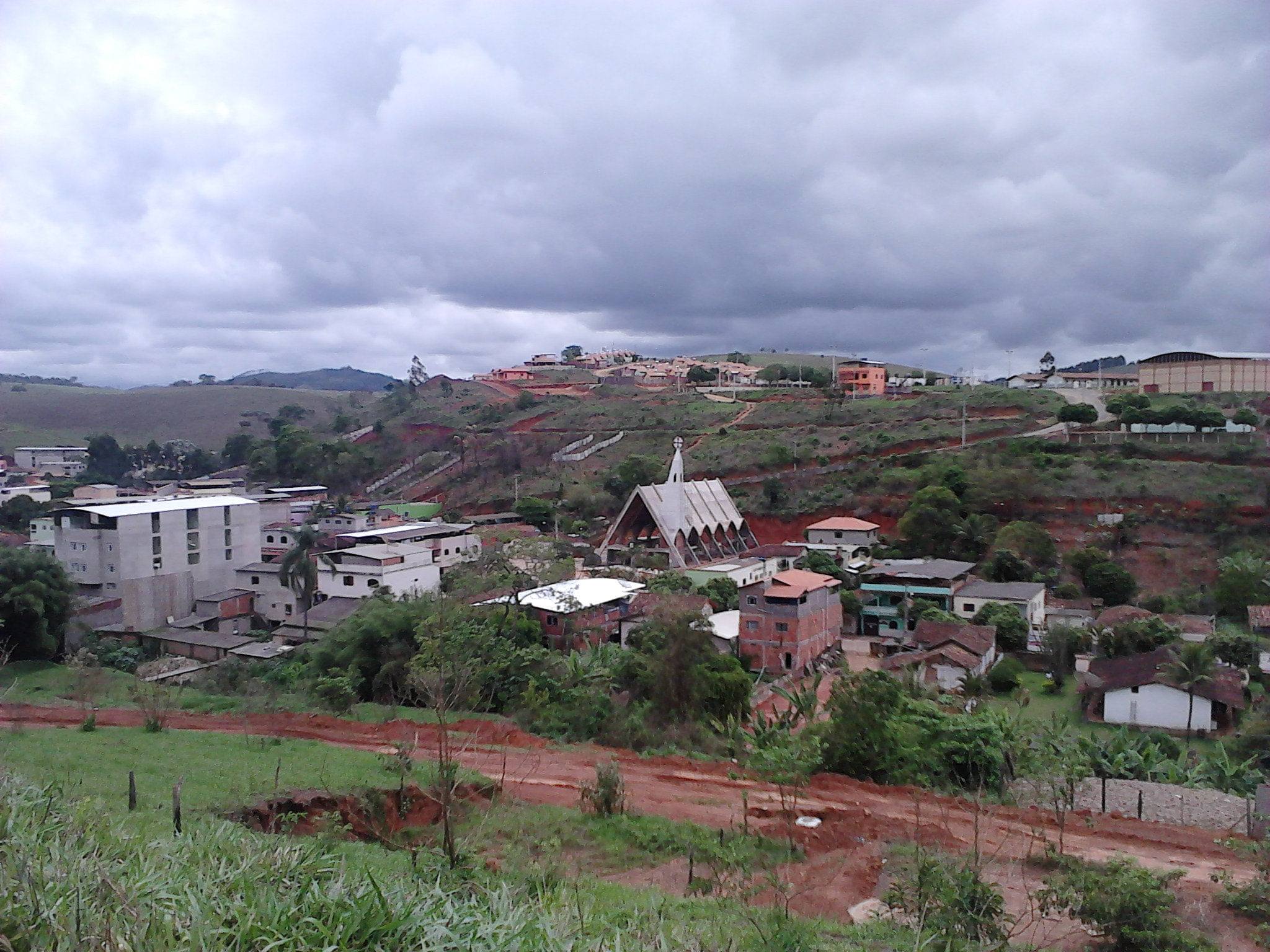
- Interactive map of Imbé de Minas
- Country: Brazil
- Region: Southeast
- State: Minas Gerais
- Mesoregion: Vale do Rio Doce

Population (2020)
  - Total: 6,940
- Time zone: UTC−3 (BRT)

Imbé de Minas is a municipality in the state of Minas Gerais in the Southeast region of Brazil.

== See also ==
- List of municipalities in Minas Gerais
