= Alvarenga, Minas Gerais =

Brazilian city in the state of Minas Gerais

Coordinates: 19°25′S 41°44′W

- Municipality
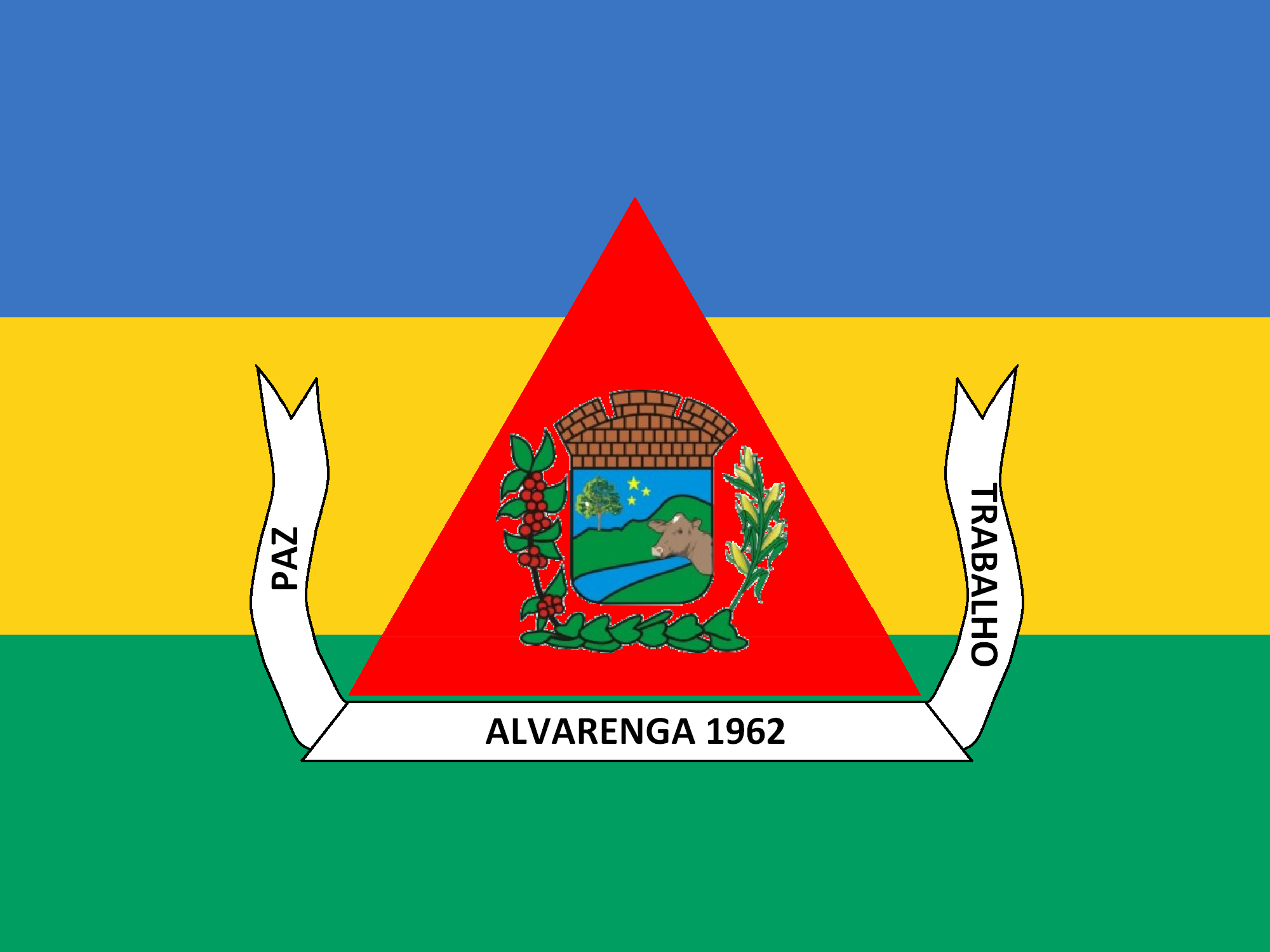
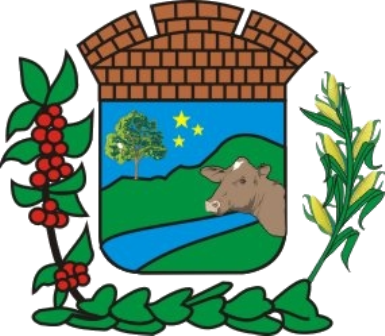
- Flag Coat of arms
- Interactive map of Alvarenga, Minas Gerais
- Country: Brazil
- State: Minas Gerais
- Region: Southeast
- Time zone: UTC−3 (BRT)

Location of Alvarenga within Minas Gerais

Alvarenga is a Brazilian municipality in the state of Minas Gerais. As of 2020 its population is estimated to be 3,844.

Alvarenga became a municipality on December 30, 1962.

== See also ==
- List of municipalities in Minas Gerais
