= Doce River =

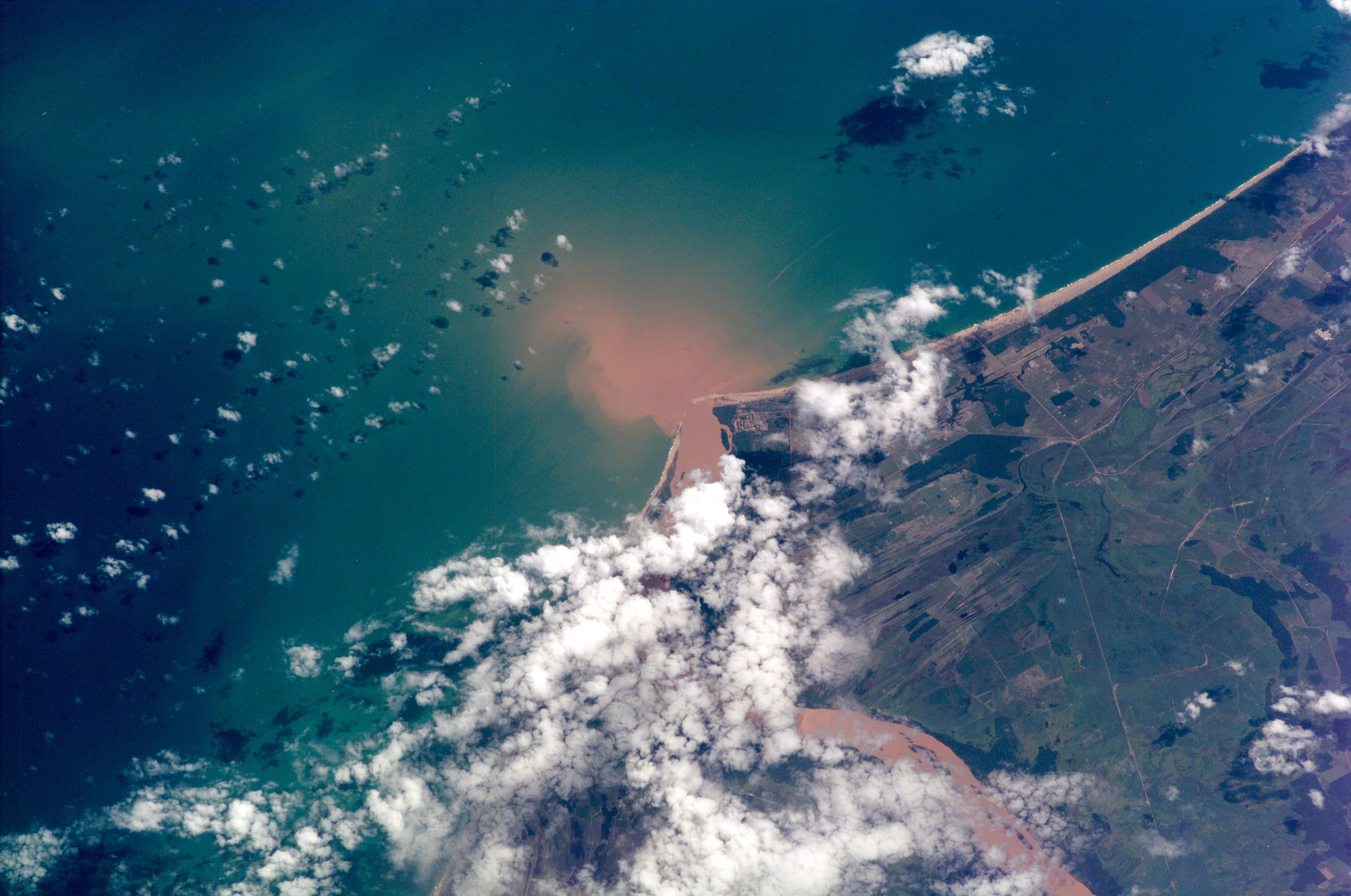
- Doce River delta at the Atlantic Ocean.

- Location within Brazil
- Native name: Rio Doce (Portuguese)

Location
- Country: Brazil

Physical characteristics
- Mouth
  - coordinates: 19.6558°S 39.8148°W

The Doce River (Portuguese: Rio Doce [ˈʁi.u ˈdos(i)], "Sweet River") is a river in southeast Brazil with a length of 853 kilometres (530 mi). The river basin is economically important. In 2015, the collapse of a dam released highly contaminated water from mining into the river, causing an ecological disaster.

== Course ==
The Doce River is formed by the junction of the Piranga and the Carmo near the historical city of Ouro Preto, whose sources are located in the foothills of the Mantiqueira and Espinhaço mountain chains at altitudes of about 1,200 m (3,937 ft). It flows in a northeastern direction via Ipatinga, makes a wide curve near Governador Valadares, and flows in a southeastern direction passing through Conselheiro Pena, to enter the Atlantic Ocean near Linhares in Espírito Santo state. Its main tributaries are the Piracicaba, Casca, Matipó, Caratinga-Cuieté, Manhuaçu, Santo Antônio and Suaçuí Grande, in Minas Gerais; the Pancas, Guandu, and São José, in Espírito Santo.

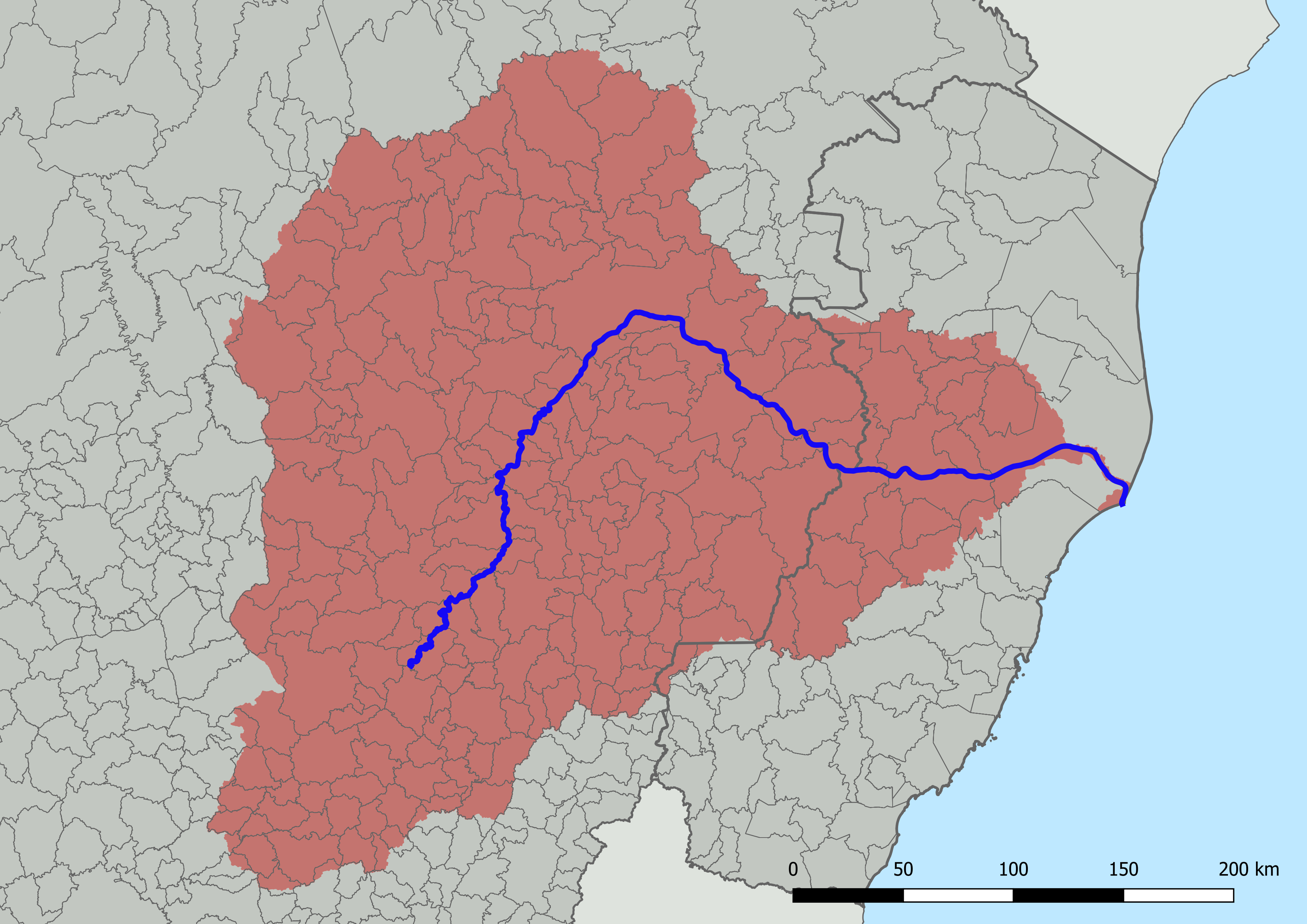
Map showing the Doce River Basin

Part of the river basin is contained in the 3,562 hectares (8,800 acres) Augusto Ruschi Biological Reserve, a fully protected area. South of the point where the Piracicaba enters the river near Ipatinga the river forms the eastern boundary of the Rio Doce State Park.

== Economic value ==
The Doce River has great economic importance for the region. The basin is home to the largest steel making complex in Latin America. Three of the five largest companies in Minas Gerais state in the year 2000, Companhia Siderúrgica Belgo Mineira, Arcelor Mittal (Acesita) and Usiminas, are located there. The largest open-pit mine in the world is operated in the basin by the Companhia Vale do Rio Doce. These industrial conglomerates have an important role in Brazilian exports of iron ore, steel, and cellulose (Cenibra). In addition, the Doce basin contributes greatly to production of coffee from Minas Gerais and Espírito Santo as well as fruit pulp from Espírito Santo.

Fifteen percent of the GDP of the state of Minas Gerais is produced in the region with the municipality of Ipatinga accounting for 5.4% of that total. Ipatinga is the major city of the Vale do Aço Metropolitan Area.

The economy of the basin is based on the following activities:

1. agriculture: dairy and beef cattle, pig raising, coffee, sugar cane, fruits and vegetables and cocoa;
2. industry: siderurgy, metallurgy, mechanical, chemical, food, alcohol, textile, leather, paper and paper pulp; and
3. mining: iron, gold, bauxite, manganese, and precious stones.

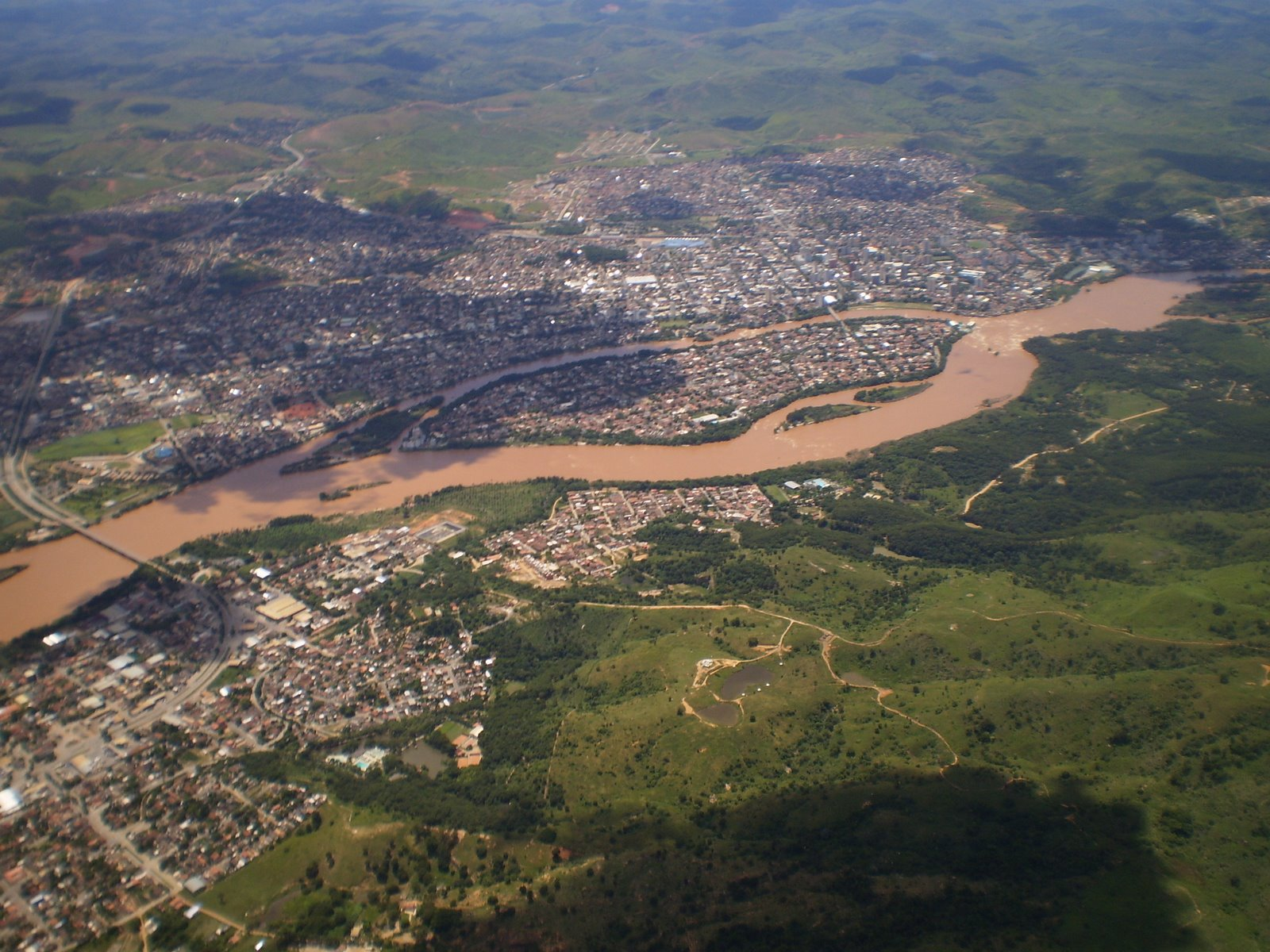
The Doce flowing through Governador Valadares

According to the Anuário Estatístico do Brasil (IBGE) the Doce basin has a population of about 3,100,000, with the urban population making up 68.7% of the total population. In recent years the population has declined, with small towns and rural areas losing up to 40% of their population.

Major cities located along the Doce or in its basin are: Timóteo, Coronel Fabriciano, Ipatinga, Governador Valadares, Colatina, and Linhares.

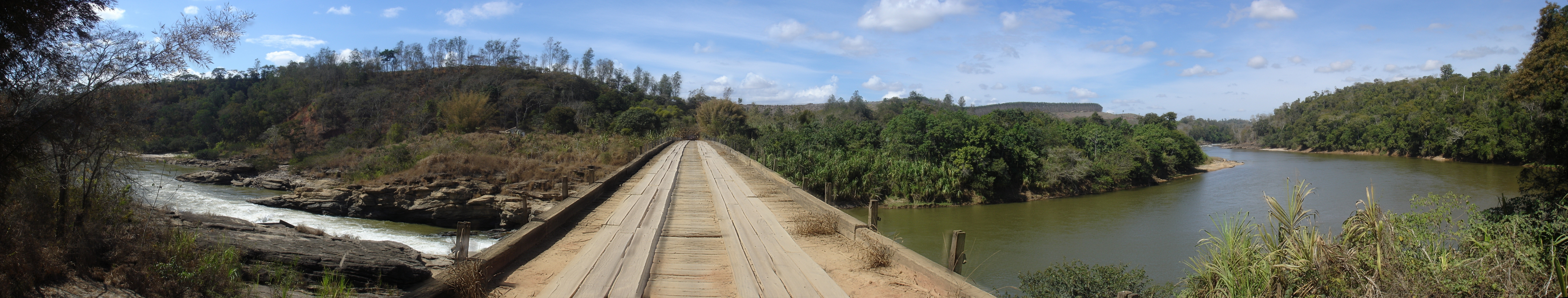
Panorama of the Queimada Bridge over the Doce River, boundary of the Rio Doce State Park, between Marliéria and Pingo-d'Água

== Climate ==
According to the Koppen classification, there are three climatic types in the Doce basin:

- Tropical with altitude climate with summer rains and cool summers, present on the slopes of the Mantiqueira and the Espinhaço Mountains and at the sources of the Doce river.
- Tropical with altitude climate with summer rains and hot summers, present at the sources of its tributaries.
- Hot climate with summer rains, present in the middle and lower sections of the Doce and its tributaries.

== Demographics ==
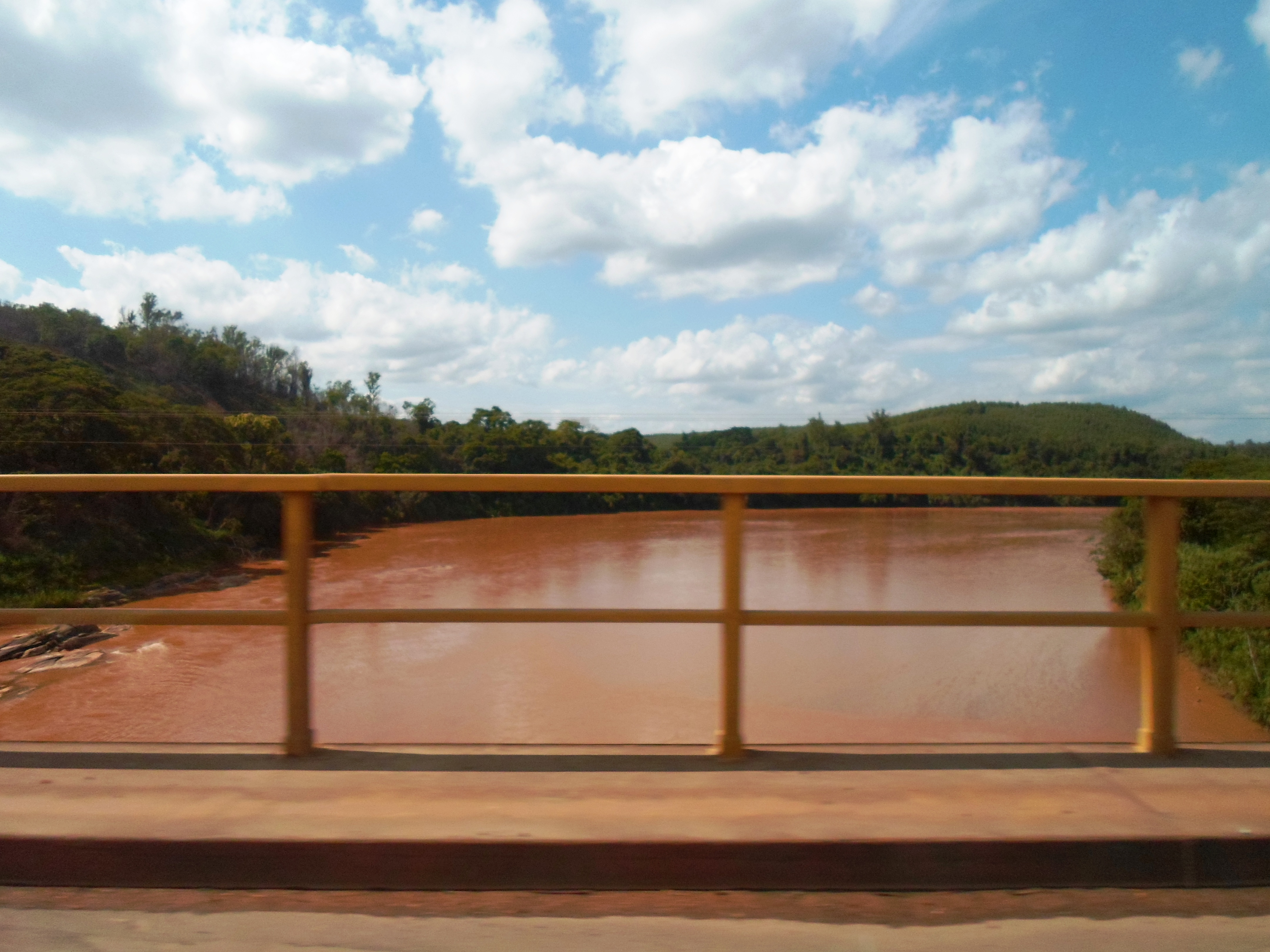
Doce River seen from the Metal Bridge, a stretch of BR-458, between Caratinga and Santana do Paraíso.

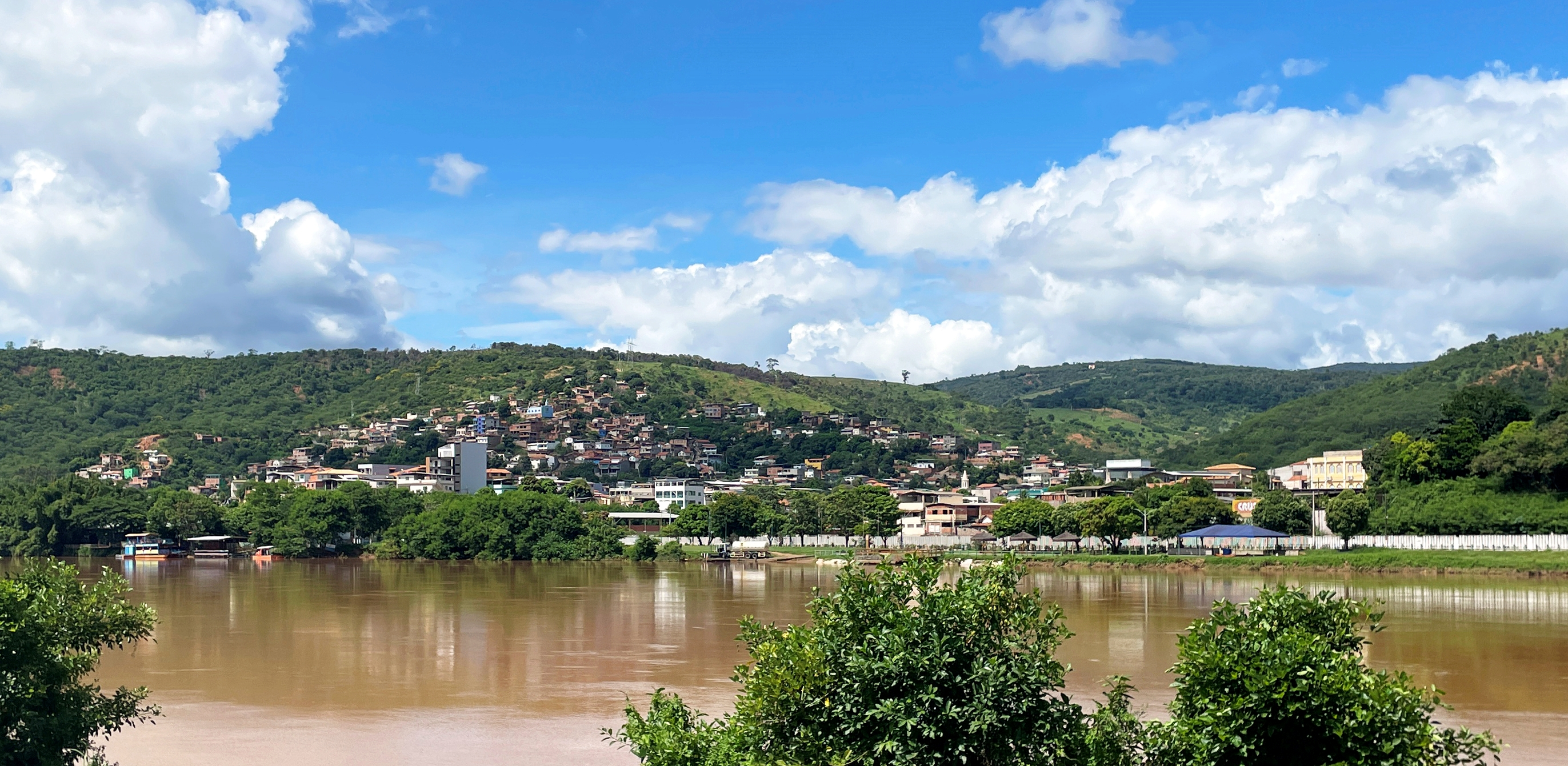
Doce River in Resplendor

According to the Comitê da Bacia Hidrográfica do Rio Doce (CBH-Doce), the Doce River basin covers all or part of 229 municipalities, of which 203 are in Minas Gerais and 26 in Espírito Santo. Of the total, 211 have their municipal seat located in the basin area, which has a population of more than 3.6 million inhabitants. The number of municipalities varies according to the source, and the National Water and Basic Sanitation Agency (ANA) considers 225 municipalities. The most populous are Governador Valadares and Ipatinga, both in Minas Gerais, which together concentrate over 540,000 inhabitants. Other municipalities with more than 100,000 inhabitants are Coronel Fabriciano, Itabira, and Ubá in Minas Gerais and Colatina, Linhares, and São Mateus in Espírito Santo.

A total of 38 municipalities are bathed by the Doce River, considering it from the confluence of the Piranga and Carmo rivers onward, 34 of them in Minas Gerais and four in Espírito Santo. Of these, Ipatinga, Governador Valadares, Colatina, and Linhares are the most populous cities on the banks. However, the municipalities of Coronel Fabriciano, Ipatinga, Santana do Paraíso, and Timóteo make up the Vale do Aço Metropolitan Region, which is the greatest population concentration in the basin. Together with its metropolitan collar the cities form a network of more than 778,000 inhabitants, according to 2021 estimates. Of the total residents of the Doce River basin, about 70% inhabit urban areas. The concentration in urban areas is directly linked to the rural exodus generated by the process of industrialization and development of the main cities, but more than 100 municipalities still have a rural population larger than the urban one. The most important federal highways crossing the region are BR-381, BR-116, BR-262, BR-101, BR-259, and BR-458.

About 51% of all water extracted directly from the Doce River basin is intended for irrigation, 22% for urban supply, 17% for industries, 7% for animal watering, and 4% for rural supply. According to 2010 information, the total exploited to meet demands is equivalent to 29.733 cubic meters per second (m³/s), a value that was considered to be within the limits of the United Nations (UN), comparing it with availability. However, the demand for human and industrial consumption is significantly increasing, at the same time that ever more intense droughts and environmental degradation have reduced water availability. The sub-basin of the Santa Joana River, in Espírito Santo, already shows a situation classified as "concerning".

=== Direct use of the waters ===
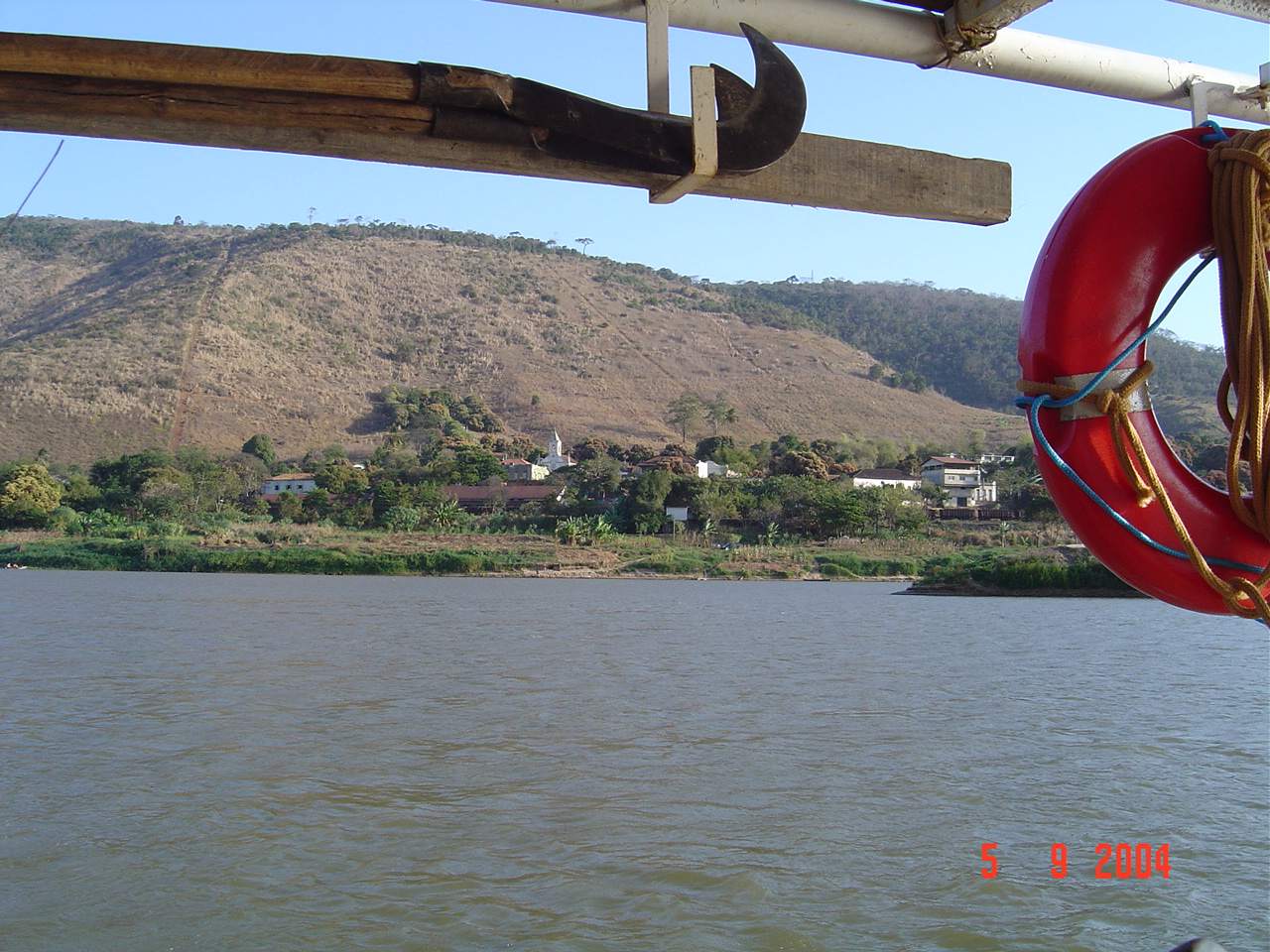
View of Itapina, a district of Colatina, from a ferry on the river.

Fishing is still present in the Doce River, although the fish population of some species has decreased over time due to the impacts caused by human action. The watercourse makes it possible to practice this activity both professionally and recreationally, but the practice of fish farming has been expanded and encouraged as an alternative to predatory fishing, given that it favors the development of fish in the river. During the piracema period, which normally runs from November 1 to February 28, restrictions are applied to favor the movement of fish to the headwaters to reproduce, for example with a limit of three kilograms and limitation to some exotic species.

Throughout the Doce River basin, there were 1699 people aged ten years or older occupied with fishing and 216 with fish farming, distributed across 39 and 19 municipalities, respectively, in 2010. In addition to fishing, the waters of the watercourse are used for leisure by riverside populations, for example for swimming and for the practice of surfing and canoeing in rapids, but excess pollutants are a health risk and drownings occasionally occur. Another form of use is for informal transport in ferryboats and canoes between nearby localities, so as to shorten land routes, but the proliferation of sandbanks during prolonged droughts occasionally compromises the journeys.

After being dominated and exterminated by the colonizers, the Aimorés, whose dominion originally extended over the extreme south of Bahia, the north of Espírito Santo, and the east of Minas Gerais, were restricted to about 630 individuals spread throughout Brazil according to 2017 data. Of this total, approximately 430 are Krenaks who inhabit an area demarcated as an indigenous land on the left bank of the Doce River in Resplendor. They depend on the river for survival, since they use it for supply, irrigation, leisure, rituals, and fishing, although these activities were compromised by the Mariana dam disaster in 2015.

== Ecology and environment ==
=== Degradation ===
At the same time that the area covered by native forest is broken up into isolated non-devastated patches, the Doce River and its tributaries are heavily affected by pollution generated by waste arising from the activities of local industries, urban sewage, rampant deforestation, mining, and excessive manipulation of its waters. Industrial and urban contamination, associated with the absence of environmental control, made the Doce River the tenth most polluted river in Brazil according to the Social Development Index (IDS) calculated by the Brazilian Institute of Geography and Statistics (IBGE) in 2011, therefore even before the dam collapse in Mariana in 2015. In 2014, the basin was identified as the most degraded in Minas Gerais.

==== In the urban context ====
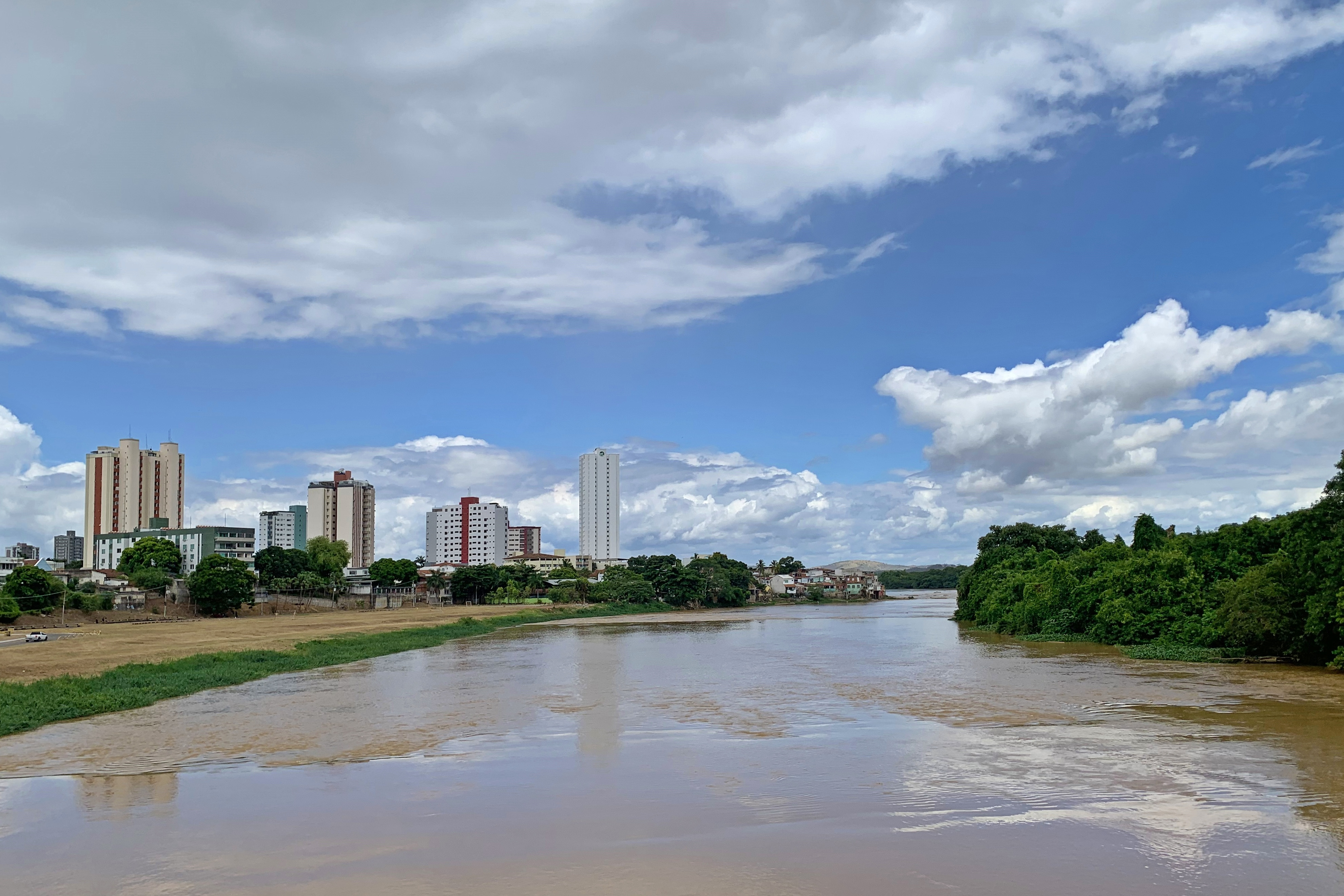
The Doce River crossing the city of Governador Valadares, the most populous municipality in the hydrographic basin.

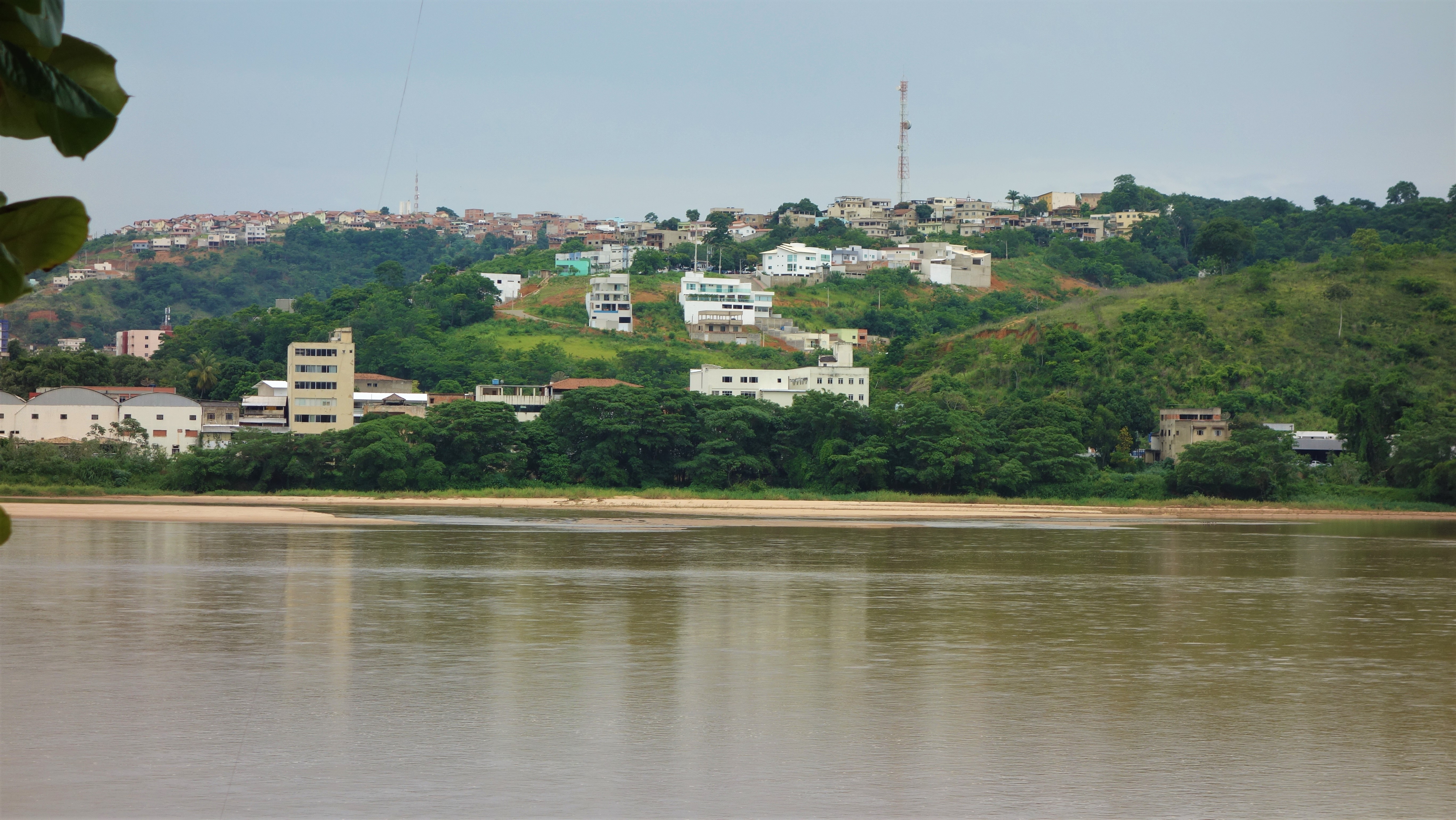
Occupied banks of the Doce River in Colatina

According to information from 2019, the Doce River receives the sewage discharged by at least 80% of the cities located on its banks without any type of treatment. The same percentage of municipalities in the basin also lack wastewater treatment, and pollution in the tributaries directly affects the main course. In several stretches along the entire watercourse and its tributaries, the presence of pollutants originating from sewage is sufficient to make the waters unsuitable for irrigation and for animal or human consumption, a situation that affects the population's living and health conditions and the transmission of diseases.

An analysis commissioned by Estado de Minas, released in April 2014, shows that the waters of the Piranga River had 1200% more fecal coliforms than permitted by the National Council for the Environment (CONAMA) after leaving the city of Ponte Nova and before meeting the Carmo River to form the Doce River. In Ipatinga the concentration was 40% higher than the limit, while in Governador Valadares it reached 240%. At the confluence of the Piranga and Carmo rivers, the presence of thermotolerant coliforms was 5172% above the acceptable level. Governador Valadares, the most populous city on the Doce River, had all sewage from the urban area discharged into the watercourse without any treatment according to information from 2021, although treatment plants had been under construction since 2014. At the same time, the riverbed was the main source of supply for the public network, but a new water intake source was being built from the Corrente Grande River. Contamination extends as far as the Atlantic Ocean, with records of fecal coliforms in the river mouth region transported through the watercourse.

Pollution of the watercourse was aggravated by the long period of irregular rainfall that the region experienced throughout the 2010s, leading to a considerable decrease in its average level and the disappearance of springs in the basin. During this drought event, the river reached its lowest level since measurements began to be made, but, as noted earlier, average precipitation in the basin area began to decrease in the 1990s. Low flow, combined with siltation, contributed to the proliferation of sandbanks and caused localities that depend on the river and its tributaries to face water shortages. On the other hand, occasional events of intense rainfall rapidly raise the river level and threaten populated zones that were established in risk areas.

==== In the socioeconomic context ====
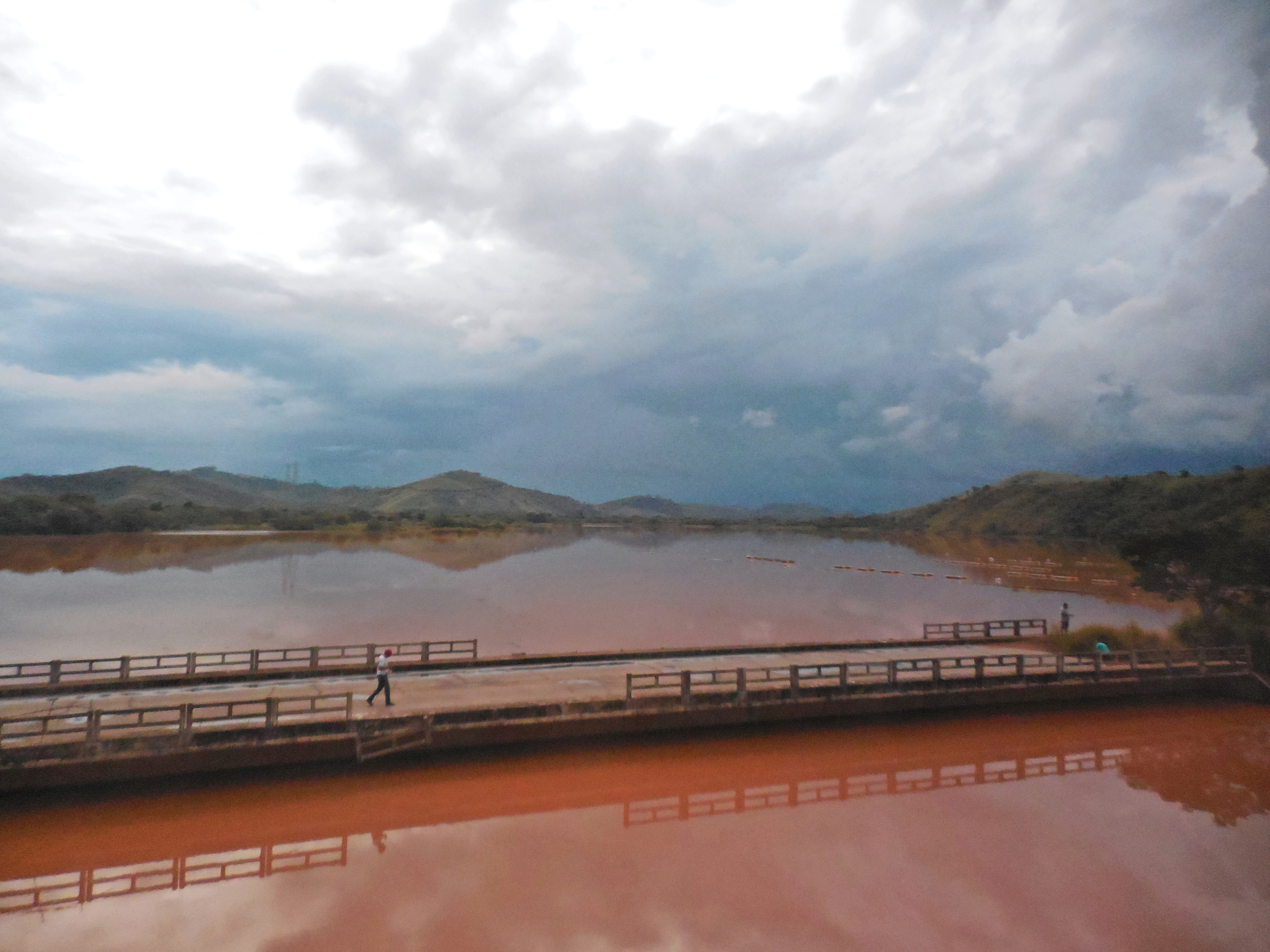
Flooded stretch of the Corrente Grande River in the reservoir of the Baguari Hydroelectric Power Plant, between Periquito and Governador Valadares.

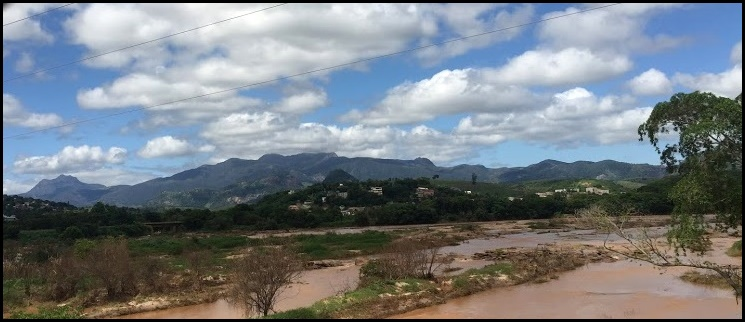
Siltation in Conselheiro Pena, in the middle Doce River.

Mining activity, concentrated mainly in the basins of the Carmo and Piracicaba rivers, causes a strong silting process in both watercourses that affects the Doce River downstream. The concentration of minerals and pollutants is also attributed to mining, and the presence of dissolved iron in the waters was 23% above the level accepted by CONAMA at the confluence of the Piranga and Carmo rivers in 2014. In Ipatinga the quantity of manganese was 52% higher than ideal. Deforestation and incorrect soil management for farming and ranching, in turn, intensify the erosive process, especially in areas of undulating relief, causing sediments to run off more rapidly toward the basin's watercourses.

Large-scale eucalyptus plantations caused a profound change in the natural landscape, given that these are vast areas occupied by a single planted species. This reduced the region's forest ecosystem and increased silting in view of large-scale soil manipulation. In addition, the use of fertilizers and pesticides is necessary to guarantee productivity, while the large quantity of water used by pulp industries depends on the basin's water sources. With regard to socioeconomic aspects, the lands occupied by eucalyptus cultivated by large industries cannot be used by local communities, disregarding regional habits and customs and human presence itself.

The construction of hydroelectric plants also produced severe changes in the landscape, since the riverbed is dammed. Upstream from the dams, flooding of the banks occurred, which included native areas and populated zones that had to be resettled. The seat of the city of Itueta had to be completely rebuilt elsewhere, from 1999 to 2004, for the implementation of the Aimorés Hydroelectric Power Plant on the course of the Doce River. Downstream, in turn, the level of the watercourse was abruptly reduced due to water retention. Because of channelization, the riverbed also ceased to bathe the seat of Aimorés, which is located where the right bank of the Doce River used to be. A reduction in the number of fish was also observed in the area covered by this power plant, generating food insecurity for the Krenak people and for fishers who depend on the river.

==== Environmental disaster in 2015 ====
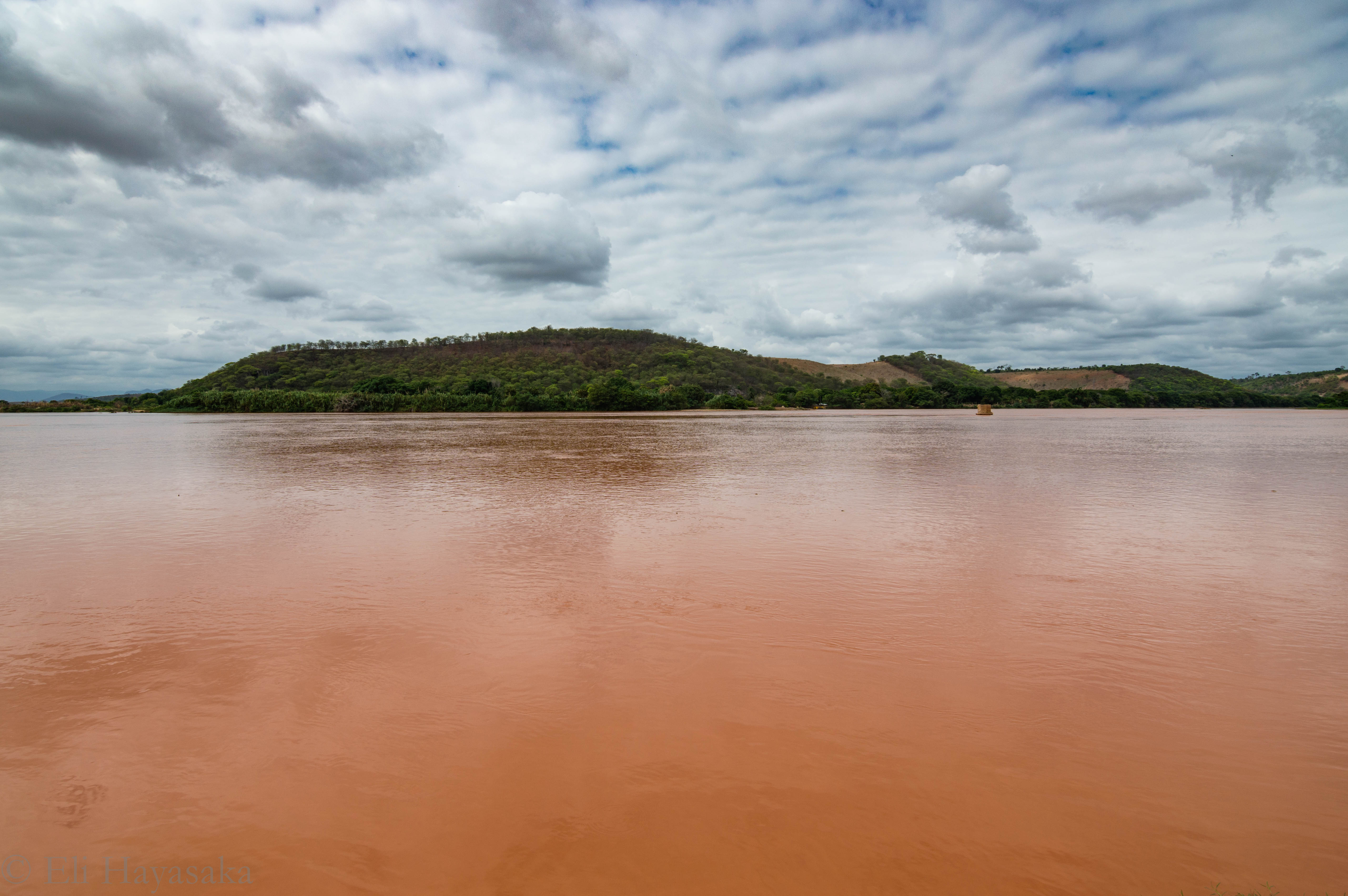
Muddy waters in the Doce River in Galileia, Minas Gerais, in November 2015, as a consequence of the dam failure in Mariana.

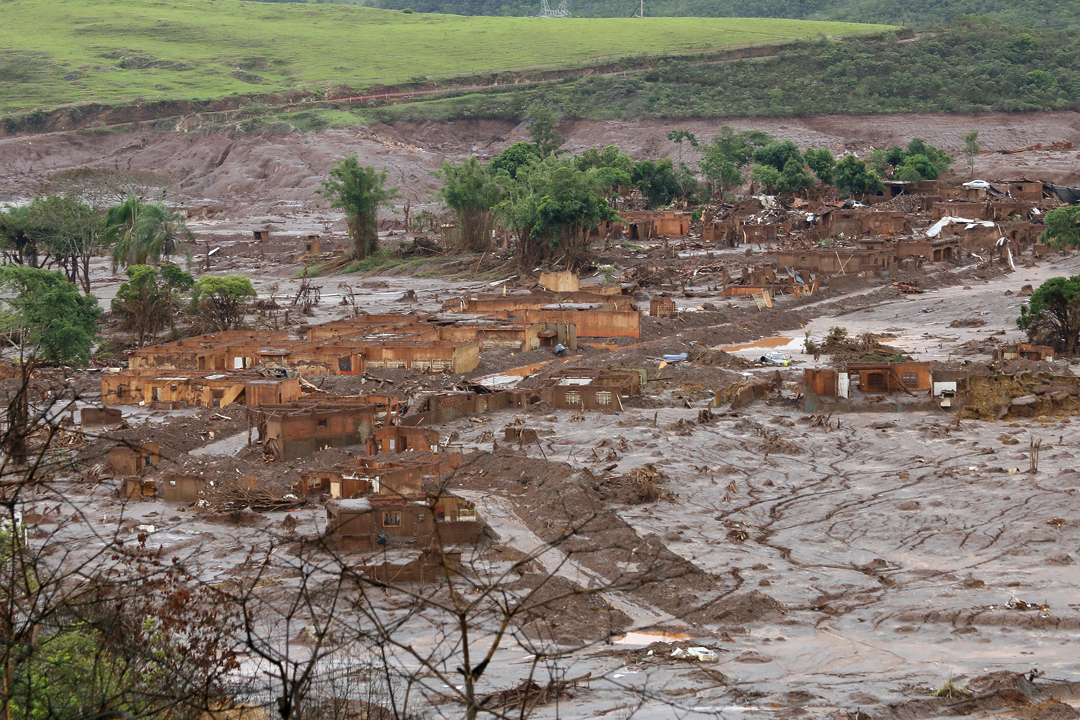
The village of Bento Rodrigues after the disaster

The watercourse was severely affected by the collapse of a tailings dam (a mine dam holding back toxic waste water from an iron ore mine) owned and operated by the mining company Samarco (which is a joint venture between Vale S.A. and BHP Billiton) that occurred in Mariana, Minas Gerais on November 5, 2015. The mud burst from the mining tailings dam first reached the Gualaxo do Norte River, then after 48 km it reached the Carmo River and 22 km downstream it flowed into the point where this river meets the Piranga River to form the Doce River.

A total of 19 people died and 50 suffered injuries in the tragedy, and the nearby localities of Bento Rodrigues and Paracatu de Baixo, downstream from the dam, in Mariana, were totally destroyed by the mudflow. At the time of the accident there was no mass alert of any kind for the communities.

In addition, the tailings mud that invaded the Doce River over the following days and weeks made municipalities supplied by the watercourse unable to use its water, including Governador Valadares, which declared a state of public disaster. The waters were contaminated by high levels of elements such as arsenic, manganese, lead, aluminium, and iron. Because of the contamination, entire communities became dependent on water trucks, rotational distribution, and donations of bottled drinking water from other municipalities for more than a month, while the river was already facing a water crisis due to prolonged drought. The tailings of toxic brown mudflows reached the Atlantic Ocean 17 days later, on November 22.

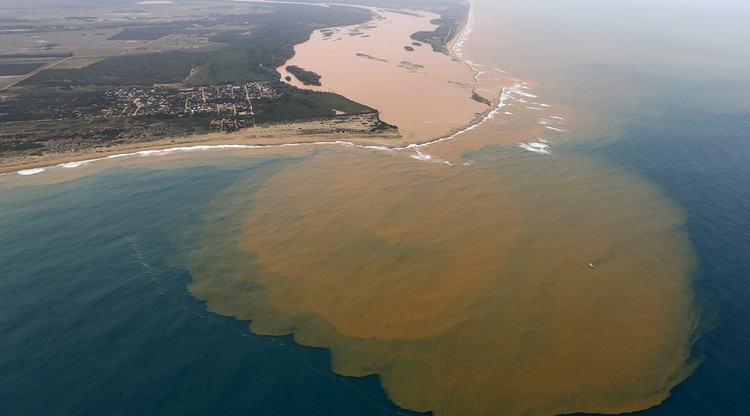
Image of the mouth of the Doce River in the Atlantic Ocean, weeks after the disaster in Mariana.

The dam collapse caused an enormous ecological damage, and threatened life along the Doce River and the Atlantic Ocean near its mouth. In all, 1469 h of land were also affected in Minas Gerais and Espírito Santo. About 40 million cubic metres (1.4 billion cubic feet) of iron waste flowed into the river.

This environmental disaster left short-, medium-, and long-term impacts caused by the accumulation of heavy metals in the water and soil, in addition to the marks in the memory of the affected communities. In January 2022, Governador Valadares recorded its third-largest flood up to that point, surpassed only by the floods of 1979 and 1997.

Economic activities, such as fishing and tourism, were completely harmed by the arrival of the mud. The impacts on the ichthyic fauna are still not fully known, but it is known that practically all fish in the upper Doce River that were affected died. One month after the tragedy at least eleven tons of fish had been collected throughout the entire watercourse. In the ocean the sediments traveled about 250 km north of the mouth of the Doce River and were recorded in the archipelago of Abrolhos in June 2016, reaching an area with an important set of marine ecosystems and coral reefs. It is thus considered the industrial disaster that caused the greatest environmental impact in Brazilian history and the largest in the world involving tailings dams, with a discharged volume of more than 55 million cubic meters.

Samarco resumed operations in Mariana in December 2020, at a time when no one had been tried for what had happened, no house had been delivered as compensation, and environmental recovery was still unfinished. Over the years the contamination caused by the accident decreased, but six years later, in 2021, metals such as iron and aluminium were present in the watercourse at levels higher than before. The estuary of the Doce River still had a manganese concentration nine times higher than normal. The impacts on the soil caused by metal intrusion also remained, limiting the reestablishment of vegetation and the ecosystem.

=== Treatment and conservation ===
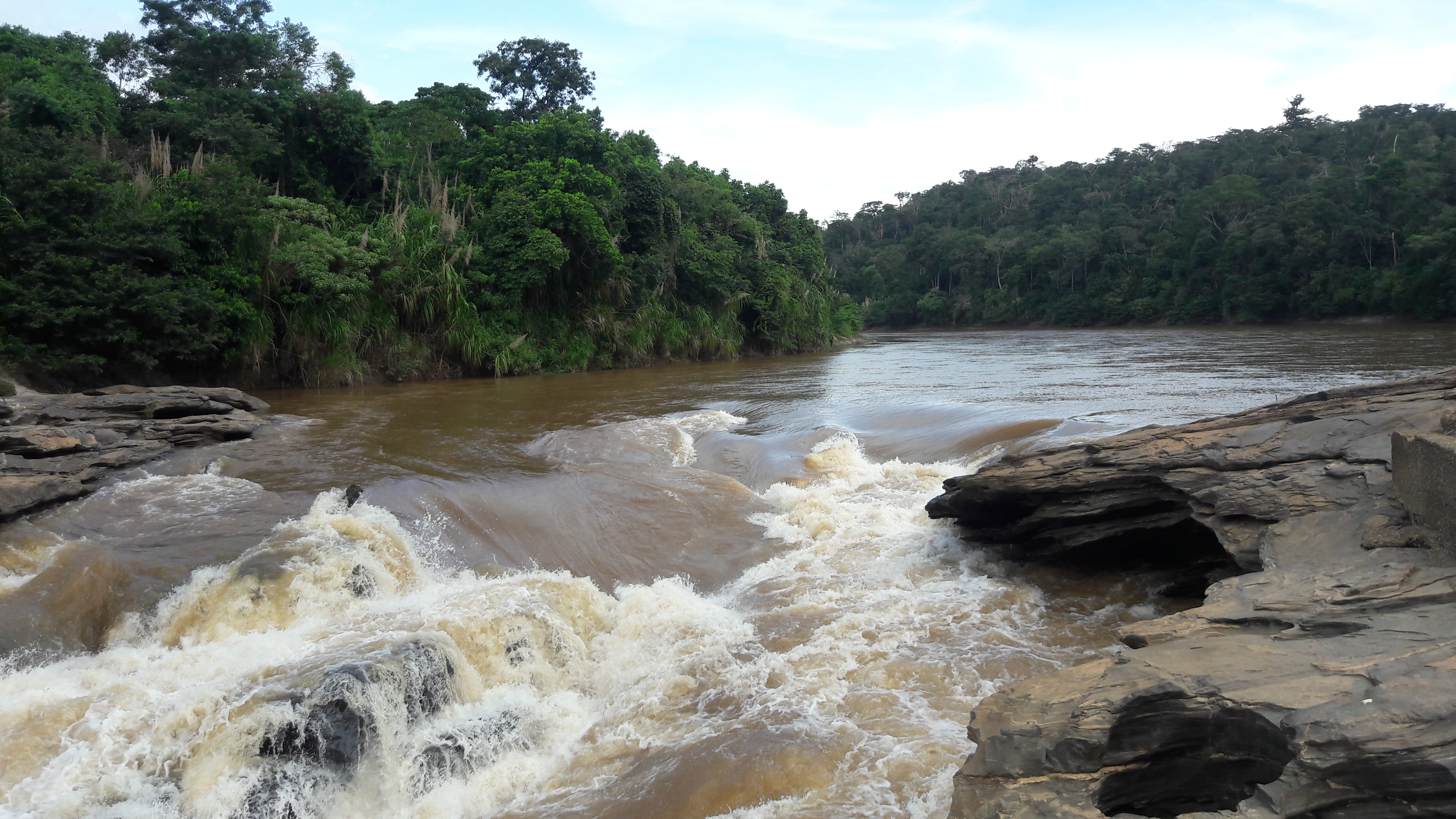
Waters of the Doce River amid riparian forest on the boundaries of the Rio Doce State Park, near Ponte Queimada.

According to data relating to 2010, only 10% of the cities in the Doce River basin had some type of treatment for their urban sewage. Among them, Catas Altas, Ipatinga, Itabira, Rio Doce, and São José do Goiabal in Minas Gerais and Rio Bananal and São Gabriel da Palha in Espírito Santo were the only ones to treat 100% of the effluent. By 2022, 44 municipalities in the basin, approximately 20% of the total of 229, treated at least 30% of wastewater. Annually an average of 295 million cubic meters (m3) of sewage is collected, but only 8.3% of this amount is treated before being discharged into watercourses. At the same time, sewage collection and treatment services simultaneously covered 23.5% of the population of the drainage area.

The Doce River has several water quality monitoring stations, managed by the National Water and Basic Sanitation Agency and by the Minas Gerais Water Management Institute (IGAM), with regular analyses of physicochemical and biological parameters. Monitoring was intensified after the Mariana dam accident in 2015. As a compensatory measure for the Mariana dam collapse in 2015, there was a Termo de Ajuste de Conduta (TAC) agreed between Samarco, Vale, BHP Billiton, and the federal, Minas Gerais, and Espírito Santo governments that created the Fundação Renova. It is a nonprofit organization whose objective is to repair the damage caused by the accident.

In addition to dealing with compensation and the construction of houses for residents who lost their homes, Fundação Renova became responsible for the environmental recovery of the affected area. In this sense, the entity allocated resources to municipalities for the construction of sewage treatment plants and maintenance of sanitation systems in the Doce River basin. It also claims to work on the recovery of 5000 springs and 40,000 hectares of areas degraded by extensive cattle raising, mining, deforestation, and fires. However, as already noted, compensation and environmental recovery have been marked by delays and low effectiveness was the subject of questions by the Minas Gerais Public Prosecutor's Office (MPMG), which also accused the foundation of misleading advertising.

==== Water management ====
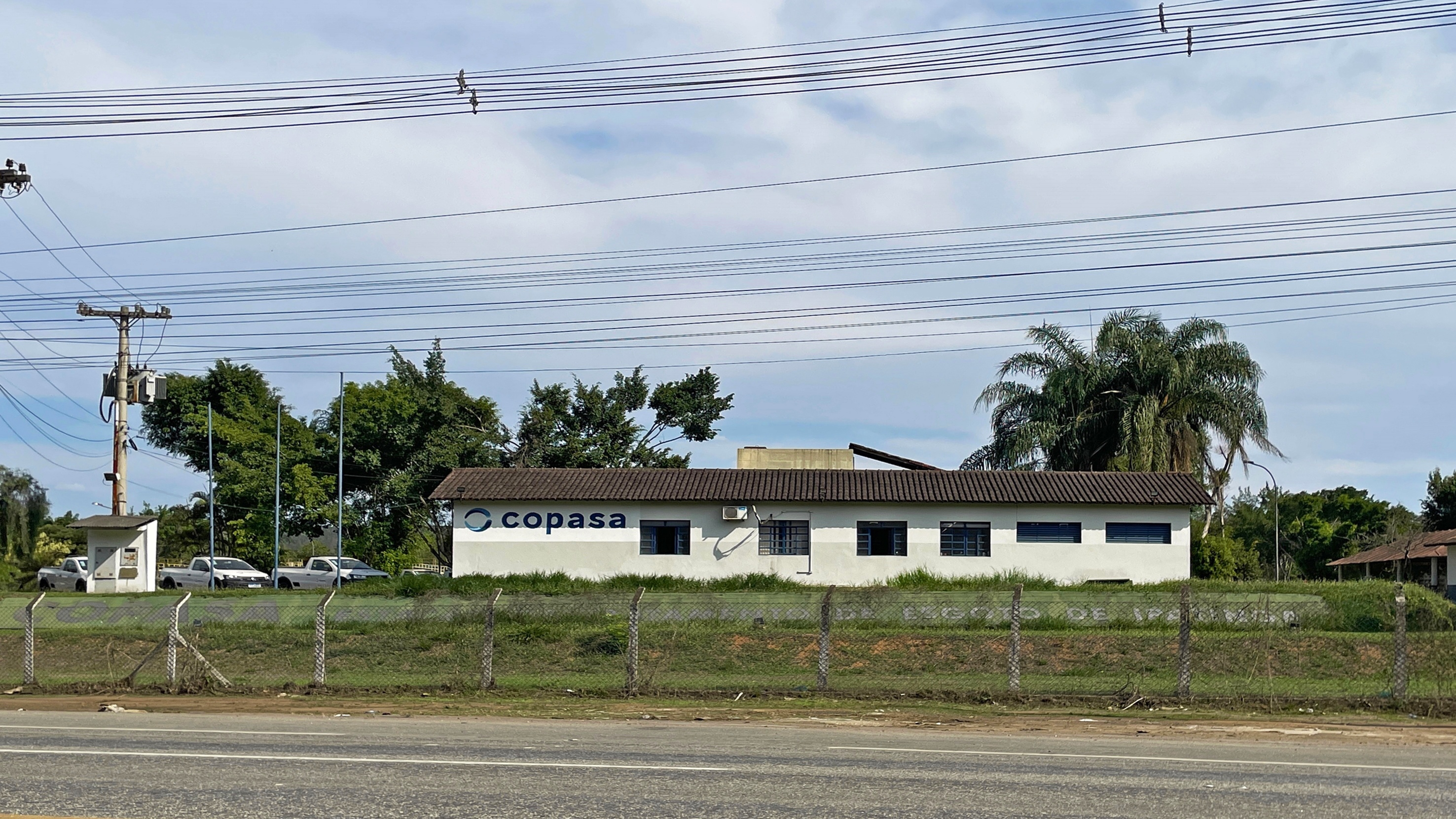
Sewage treatment plant located near the mouth of the Ribeirão Ipanema in the Doce River in Ipatinga

The Doce River is considered a river of national relevance because it flows through more than one state, as defined in the Federal Constitution. The Doce River Hydrographic Basin Committee (CBH-Doce), established under a resolution of the National Water Resources Council (CNRH) in 2002, is the normative and deliberative body responsible for the water resource management of the basin through mediation among actors in society. It is subordinate to the federal government and is composed of members of public authorities, companies, and civil society. Its functions include monitoring conflicts, promoting basic sanitation, preserving and restoring the basin's water resources, and charging for water use.

Subordinate to the Doce River basin committee are six planning units in Minas Gerais, corresponding to the committees of the sub-basins of the Piranga, Piracicaba, Santo Antônio, Suaçuí (Pequeno and Grande), Caratinga, and Manhuaçu rivers. In Espírito Santo, there are the committees of the sub-basins of the Guandu, Santa Joana, and Santa Maria do Doce rivers, of the "Pontões e Lagoas do Rio Doce", and of "Barra Seca e Foz do Rio Doce". Among the actions of CBH-Doce are the funding and/or execution of water and sewage system works, programs for rational water use and water security, programs for living with floods, environmental education activities, and interventions to control sediment production; the improvement of rural properties with water capture and storage technologies; support for and follow-up of reforestation and environmental restoration works; and the preparation of integrated plans and studies for natural resource management.

==== Environmental preservation ====
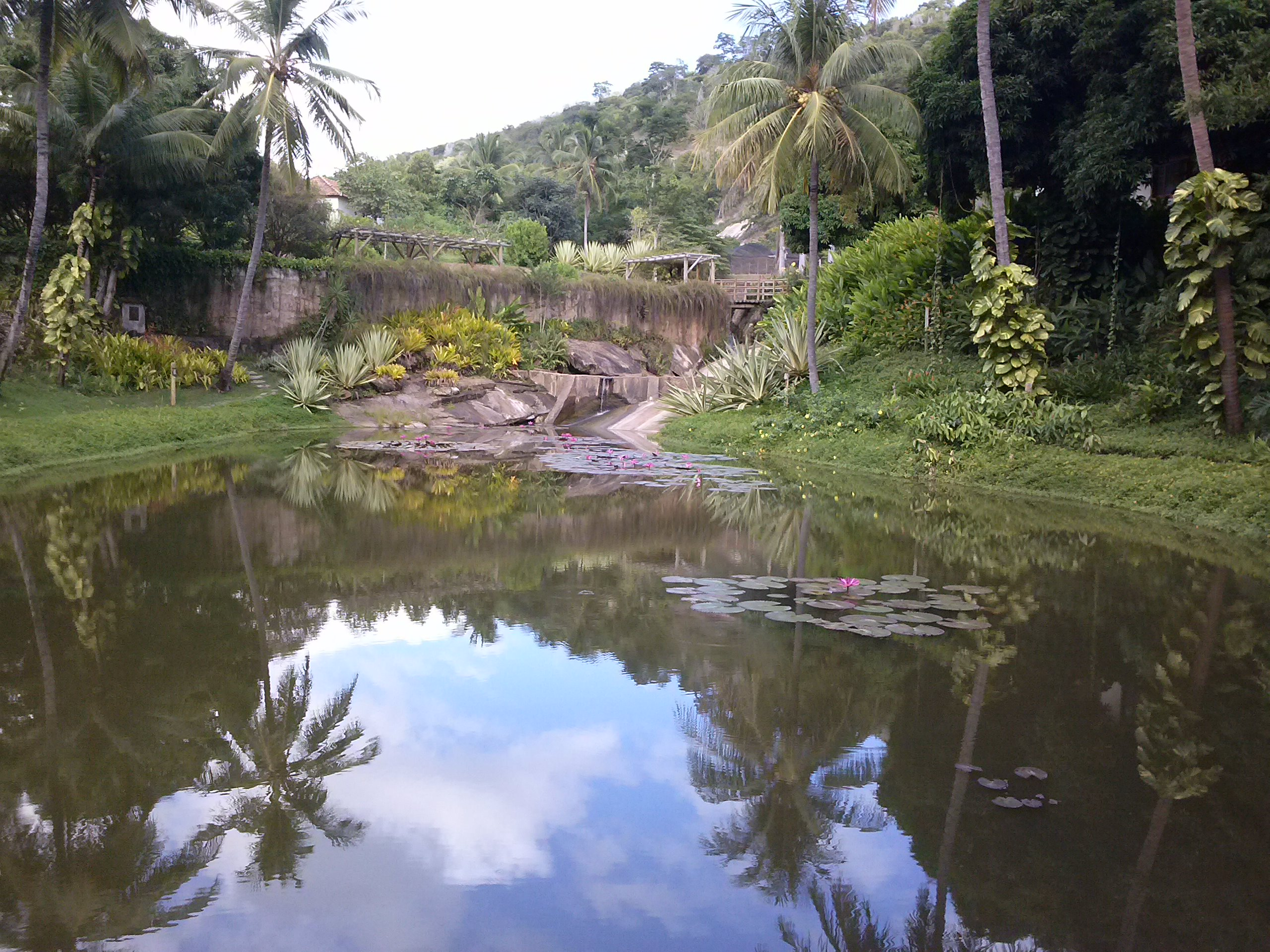
Headquarters of the Instituto Terra in Aimorés, an area of the basin considered a private natural heritage reserve (RPPN).

The coverage of riparian forest along the course of the Doce River is restricted to 14.9% of its banks in Minas Gerais and 21.3% in Espírito Santo, but only 1% is preserved with native forest, which is the result of the dominant land use by the region's economic activities. In 2010, the basin had 19 strict-protection units among national, state, and municipal parks, ecological stations, biological reserves, and natural monuments (Pontões Capixabas), which are distinguished by the prohibition of direct use of their natural resources. In addition, there were 20 private natural heritage reserves (RPPNs) and 60 environmental protection areas (APAs), although APAs may be merely demarcated, without management instruments existing.

The spring considered the first source of the Doce River, in Ressaquinha, is located on private property, but it was fenced by IEF-MG in 2019. However, the waters are compromised downstream by rampant mining and sewage. The Rio Doce State Park (PERD), created in 1944 with the intention of protecting one of the last remnants of native forest in the Doce River Valley, contains the largest Atlantic Forest reserve in the basin and in Minas Gerais, besides constituting one of the largest lake systems in the world. The hydrographic course borders the park, which has 36,000 hectares distributed among the municipalities of Dionísio, Marliéria, and Timóteo. The estuary of the watercourse in Linhares, in turn, is monitored because it is a nesting site for sea turtles.

In the middle Doce River is located the Instituto Terra, begun by Lélia and Sebastião Salgado with 700 h of degraded land reforested with native forest in Aimorés. This is the so-called Fazenda Bulcão, where the source of the Bulcão stream, a tributary of the Doce River, is located, and which was transformed into a private natural heritage reserve (RPPN). The initiative aims to extend this protection to other springs in the basin, encouraging landowners who have springs to protect them through the donation of materials to fence them off.

Studies and activities in favor of the conservation of the Doce River are carried out by public bodies, companies, environmental NGOs, environmental groups, and independent researchers. In 2014, the NGO The Nature Conservancy (TNC) began monitoring and providing technical advisory support for the restoration of 1500 hectares of forests in the Doce River basin, in association with the Espírito Santo Institute of Environment and Water Resources (IEMA). In 2020, the Doce River Hydrographic Basin Committee joined TNC's Water Governance Monitoring Protocol, which is a tool that evaluates and identifies management problems of the committee itself. It is also worth noting that research activities regarding the conditions of the watercourse and conservation of its waters are produced by educational institutions and universities.

== Popular culture ==
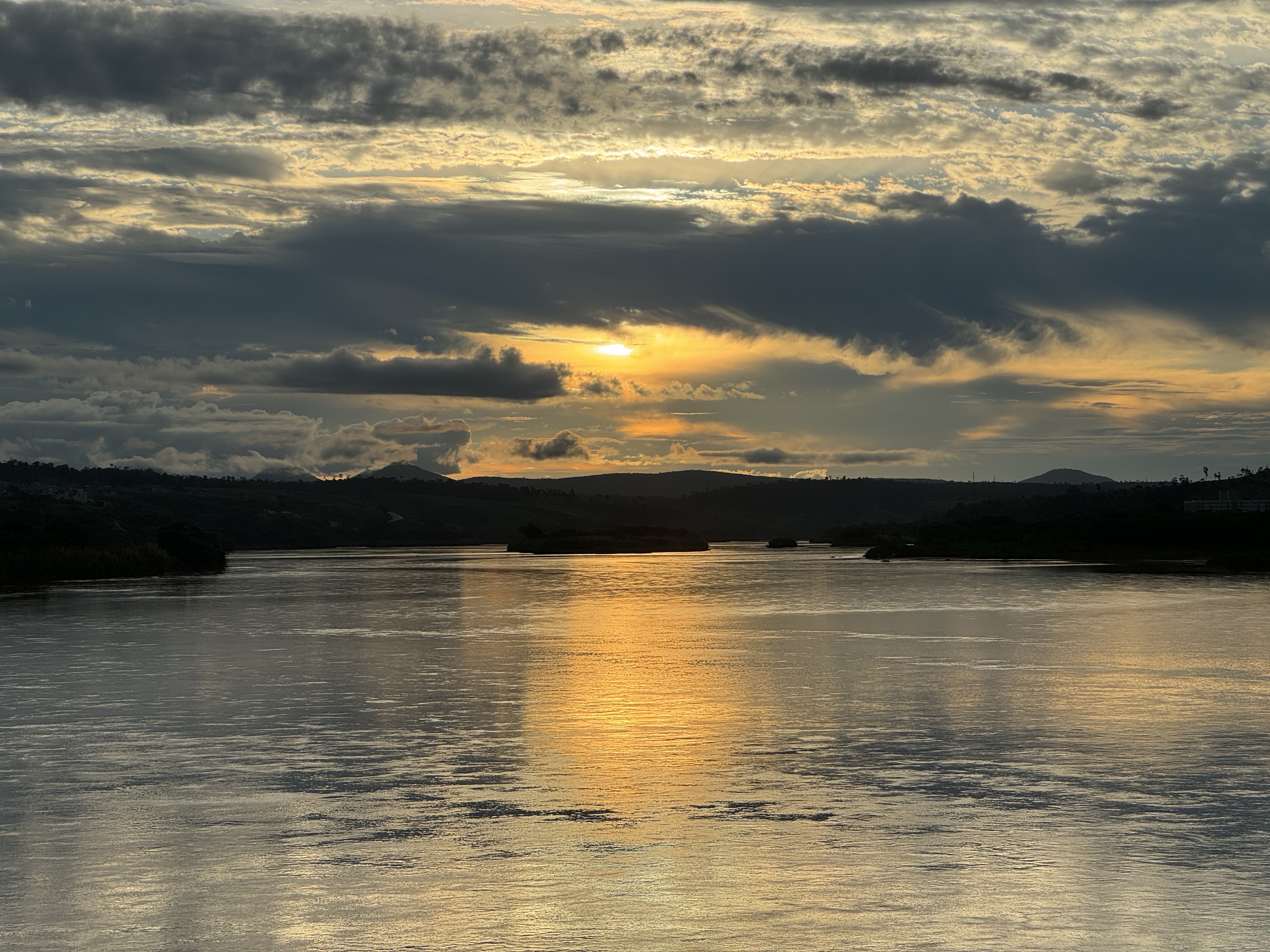
Sunset reflected over the Doce River in Colatina

Although degraded, the Doce River is still incorporated into the daily life of residents around its course, whether through its direct use or solely through its physical existence. The course is directly linked to the history of the cities that developed on its banks, and is even referenced in the name of the municipality of Rio Doce. This, in turn, was inherited from the old railway station of the locality served by the Leopoldina Railway, Rio Doce Station, whose name refers to the watercourse.

Together with the historical context, the Doce River is part of various landscapes that contain individual and collective meanings for nearby residents, inspiring memories and recollections. Associated with variations in relief and weather (such as at sunset), the watercourse also enables the creation of attractive physical landscapes. Attractive views of the river can be contemplated through the passenger train of the Vitória to Minas Railway, which runs daily between the metropolitan regions of Vitória and Belo Horizonte.

For the Krenak people, inhabitants of the banks in the middle Doce River, the watercourse has its own personality, as do each water source and each hill. As parts of nature, they ultimately represent a common ancestor, with whom they communicate. They call the river "Watu", which means "river that runs" or "river that speaks". The use of the riverbed has symbolic value not only for the Indigenous people, but also for individuals and communities that depend on it. This is explicit in Regência Augusta, where there are fishing communities that survive from artisanal fishing in the watercourse.

In 2005, the government of Minas Gerais made official the Circuito Turístico Trilhas do Rio Doce, with the aim of stimulating and promoting tourism in cities of the Doce River Valley. These municipalities have cultural, historical, and geographical aspects in common that are linked by their proximity to the river. In reference to the day on which the Portuguese colonizers first sighted the Doce River, on December 13, 1501, December 13 is considered the "Day of the Doce River".

=== Cultural references ===
The river? It is sweet.
The Vale? Bitter.

— Carlos Drummond de Andrade, in Lira Itabirana (1984)

The physical and cultural landscapes integrated with the river, as well as the adversities faced by the riverbed, are sometimes exalted in cultural manifestations, such as photographs, publications in the mass media, music and literature. The photographer Sebastião Salgado, internationally known for his socially and humanitarianly focused work, is from Aimorés. One of the inspirations for his international work "Gênesis" (ISBN 3-8365-3872-5; 2013) is his contact with the nature of his homeland, including his contact with the Doce River and with Instituto Terra, discussed earlier. In music, Beto Guedes, Tavinho Moura, and Ronaldo Bastos composed "Rio Doce" in 1981, in which the watercourse is described as a setting.

The watercourse is listed in Caramuru (1781), which narrates the story of the Portuguese castaway Diogo Álvares Correia (Caramuru) and his coexistence with the Tupinambá. Rubem Braga, in turn, describes the Espírito Santo stretch in the works Barra do Rio Doce (1949) and O lavrador (1954). Carlos Drummond de Andrade, while questioning the impacts of mining in Itabira in the poem Lira Itabirana (1984), also refers to the Doce River. In 1996, Ziraldo, a native of Caratinga, published the book O menino do Rio Doce, in which he describes his contact with the riverbed in childhood. O cheiro de Deus (2001), by Roberto Drummond, is another literary work that refers to river pollution. Geny Vilas-Novas, born in Periquito, emphasizes the river as a setting in works such as Flores de Vidro (2015), Onde Está Meu Coração? (2015) and Uma história dentro da outra e Lendas do rio Doce (2017). The river also stars in the graphic novel Doce Amargo (2025), by cartoonist João Marcos Parreira Mendonça, who lives in Governador Valadares, addressing the impact of the Mariana environmental disaster on the daily life of the population of Valadares and of the author.

=== Landmarks and attractions ===
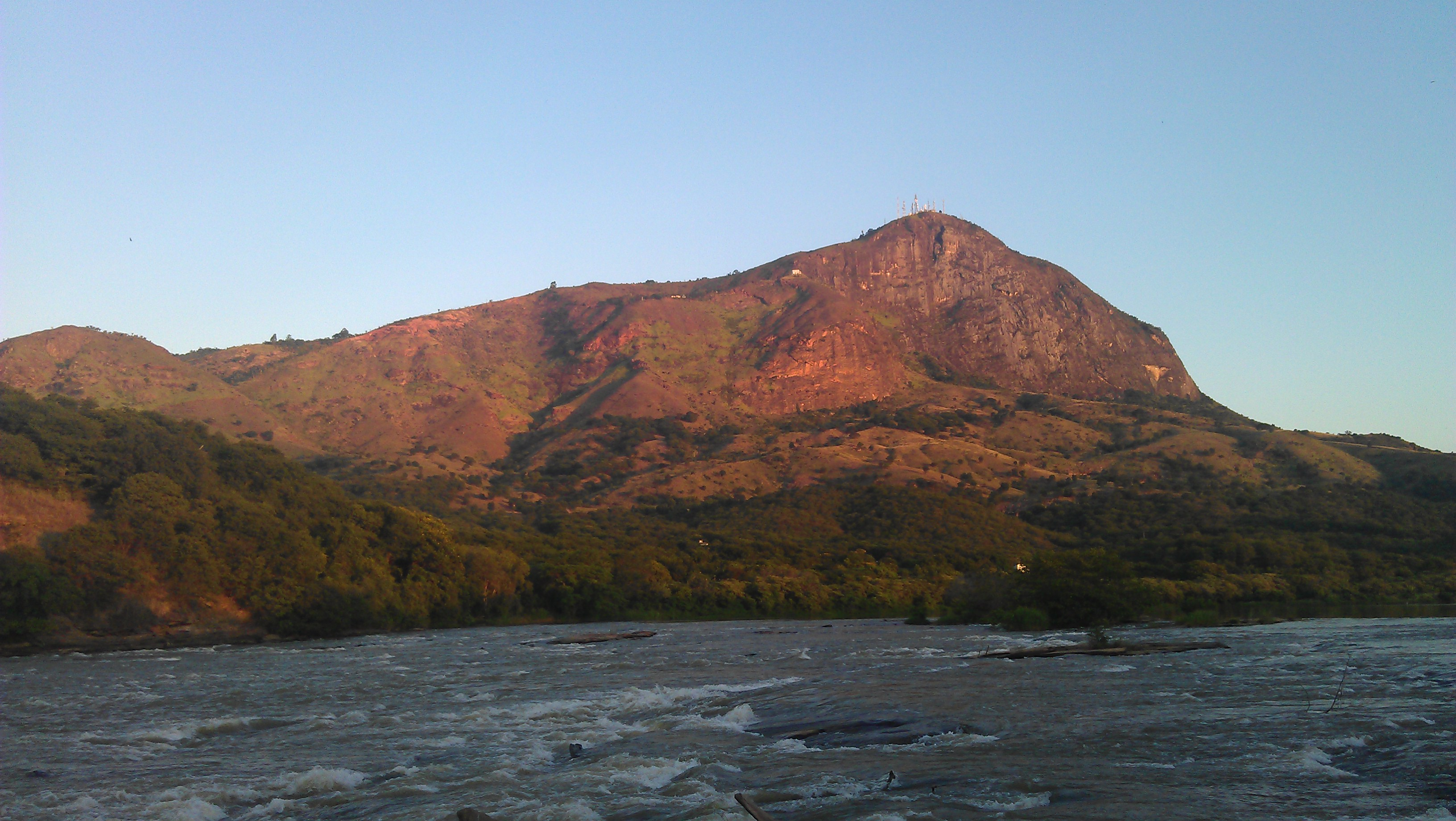
The Doce River with Ibituruna Peak in the background in Governador Valadares

The course of the Doce River is directly linked to a series of remaining assets that are configured as attractive places to visit. Some points on its banks have freshwater beaches, one of the main ones being Praia do Jaó, in Tumiritinga. Its landscape ensemble was recognized as cultural heritage by the Institute of the Historical and Artistic Heritage of Minas Gerais (IEPHA) in 2006. Despite the poor water quality, with direct contact with the river to be avoided, the complex also includes an events area, walking track, environmental preservation area with trails, and a square on the riverbank.

Between the municipalities of Marliéria and Pingo-d'Água, on one of the boundaries of Rio Doce State Park, is located the Ponte Queimada. Although it was rebuilt in the 1930s to transport local charcoal production, its name honors a fire at the site caused by Indigenous people in the past, and the construction preserves its original characteristics of iron girders and a wooden body. As a replacement for this bridge, construction of a new one began in Bom Jesus do Galho, also on the boundaries of the state park, but the work was embargoed in 1973 because of possible environmental impacts on the region. This became the Ponte Perdida, later used as an environmental monitoring point.

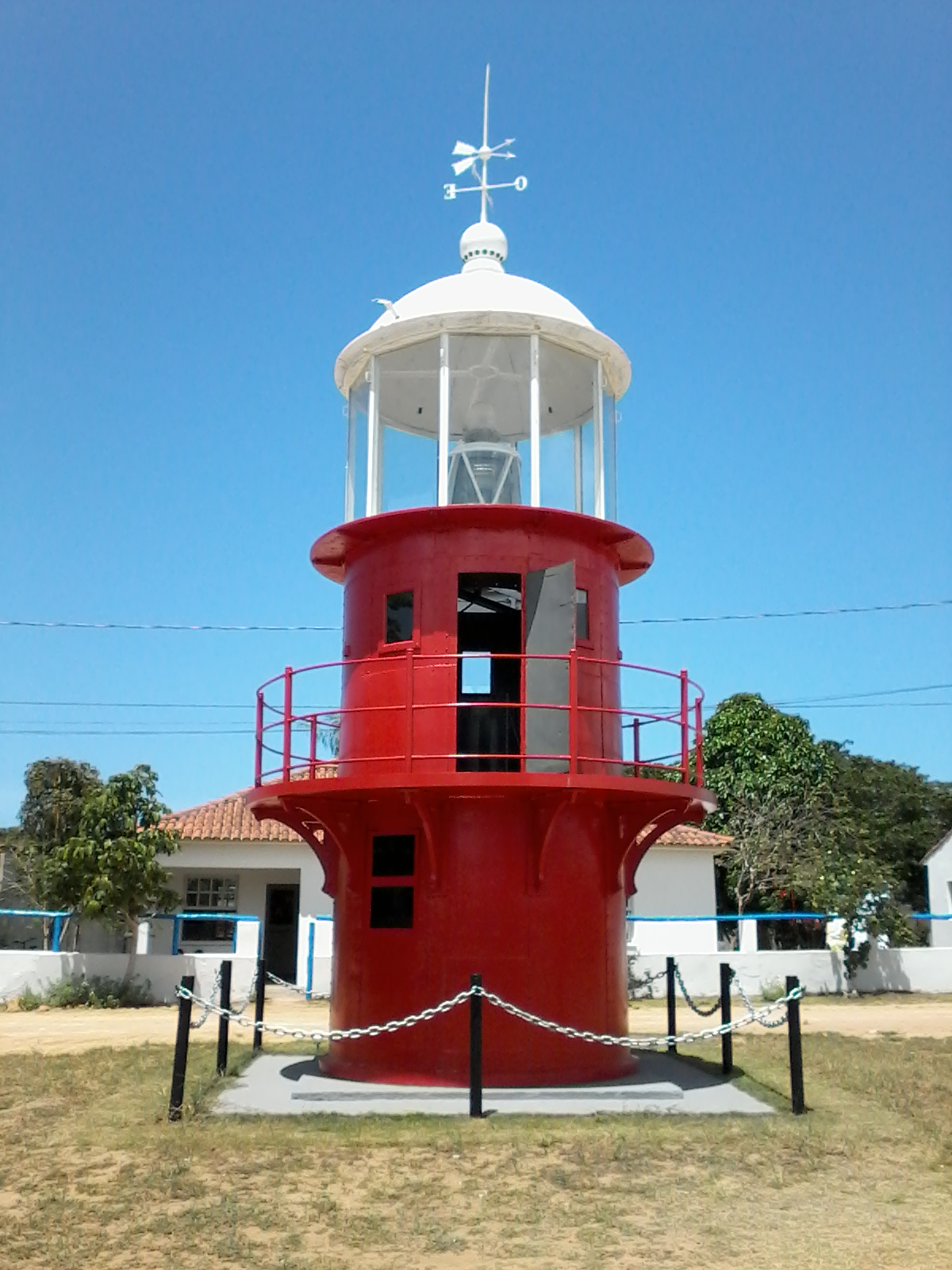
Dome of the old Farol do Rio Doce (1895)

In Governador Valadares is located the Ponte do São Raimundo, which is the first large bridge built in the municipality, with its deck of 447 m (1,467 ft) in length serving the passage of BR-116. Dating from the 1940s, its portal structure with arch beams was considered complex for the locality at the time of its inauguration. The Doce River, as well as Ibituruna Peak, located on its right bank, are among the principal symbols of the city as members of the landscape. In Itapina, a district of Colatina, standing out in the landscape over the riverbed is an arch bridge that was abandoned without ever being completed in the 1950s. The works were halted because of a calculation error and were never resumed. The structure cannot be reused because it was condemned due to wear over time, but because of its historical and landscape value it was listed as part of the Historic Site of Itapina.

The Florentino Avidos Bridge, in Colatina, was inaugurated as part of public incentives for the development of northern Espírito Santo in 1928. In addition to linking the northern and southern regions of the city, which is divided by the Doce River, the construction is one of the main symbols of the municipality together with Avenida Beira Rio and the river. On the northern bank of the mouth of the watercourse, in the village of Regência Augusta, the Farol do Rio Doce stands out, originally built by the Brazilian Navy in 1895. Twelve years later it was replaced by another farther south, but the old one was listed by the government of Espírito Santo in 1998.

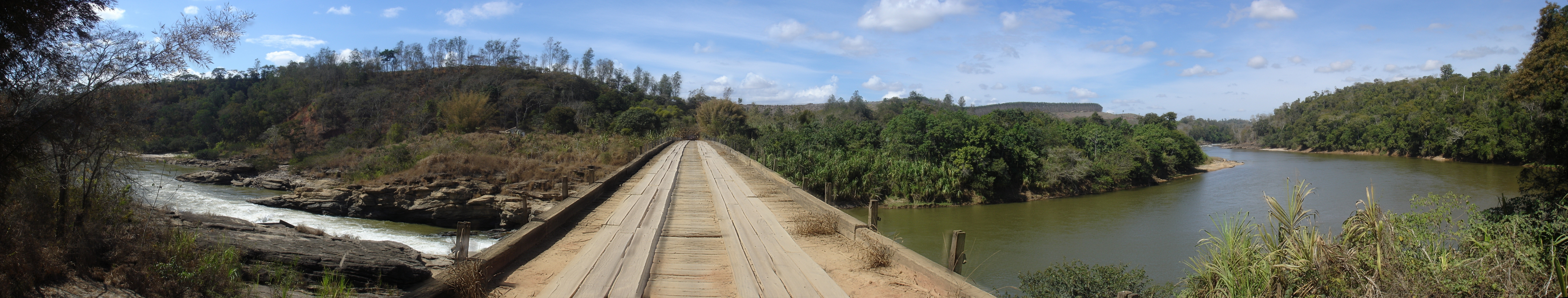
Panorama of the Ponte Queimada over the Doce River seen from the exit of Rio Doce State Park, between Marliéria and Pingo-d'Água.

== History ==
The Doce River basin has rocks dated to the Eoarchean and the Proterozoic, which go back to the earliest ages of the Earth. The river, through the transport of sediments, contributed to shaping the relief of this region over time. It was also in this way that the diversity of lagoons that are part of the basin was formed. However, northern Espírito Santo, including the lower Doce River, only formed from the silting up of the Atlantic Ocean in the Cenozoic. The watercourse contributed to this silting due to the displacement of sediments, forming the surface beneath the present municipality of Linhares throughout the Pleistocene and the Holocene.

=== Exploration ===
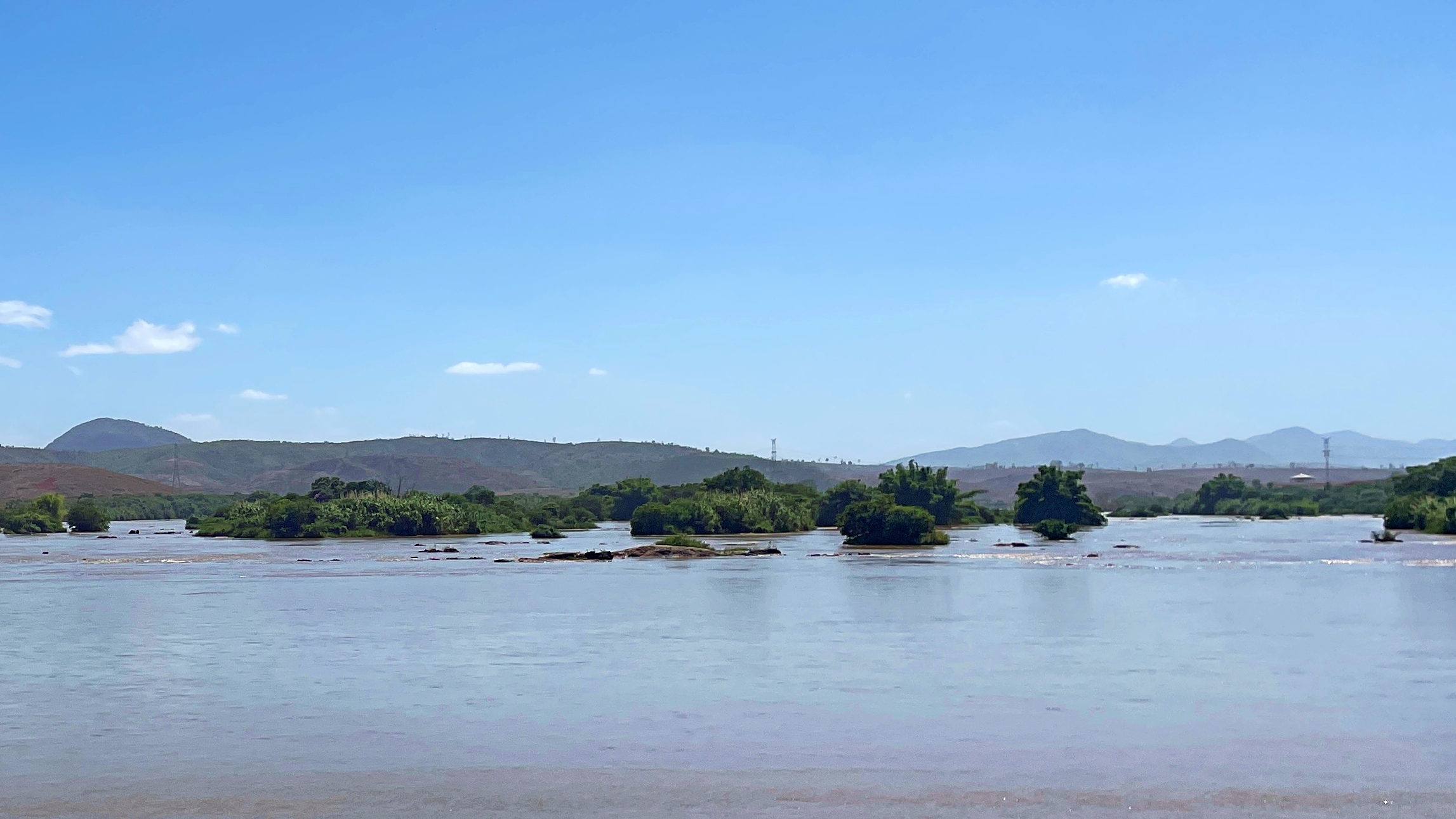
Doce River in Tumiritinga, a region that was inhabited by native peoples in the past.

Known human presence on the banks of the Doce River is relatively late. While in the Belo Horizonte metropolitan area there are archaeological records more than 10,000 years old, among them the fossil of Luzia, the oldest traces of human life found on the riverbanks are dated to the 14th century. On that occasion the Tupis traveled along the course coming from the coast and came to inhabit areas between Governador Valadares and Tumiritinga, in Minas Gerais. However, at some point, for unknown reasons, they left the place. It is known that Aimorés coming from Espírito Santo and southern Bahia also frequented the Doce River valley, but only in the months of the dry season, because in the rainy months the proliferation of mosquitoes and tropical diseases was greater.

The river was one of the limits of the Aimorés' area of dominion, which extended as far as the Salitre River, in Bahia. However, they were semi-nomadic and were in constant movement. Pataxós and Puris could also be found near the riverbed. It was first described by Portuguese colonizers by André Gonçalves on December 13, 1501, during an expedition sent by the Portuguese Crown to reconnoiter the coast of Brazil. A few years later it received the name that remains to this day, "Doce River", because the first expeditions along the coast identified the river's fresh water in the sea without even being able to sight the mouth. Before flowing into the ocean the course makes a curve that hinders its visualization. Later, it became a means of penetration for the colonizers in the exploration of the present-day states of Espírito Santo and Minas Gerais.

Sebastião Fernandes Tourinho was the first to travel along the river, from 1553 to 1573, in search of gold and emeralds. In 1577, Salvador Correia de Sá, o Velho also explored the watercourse. The first inland expeditions had the main objective of searching for gold and other precious materials. Myths inherited from the indigenous people held that the valley contained deposits of these metals and stones. However, the dense forest, tropical diseases, and indigenous resistance were factors that repelled the intrusions. Fernão Dias came to announce that he would lead a bandeira along the Doce River in 1672, but unlike the previous ones it would depart from the headwaters coming from the ranges of the Mantiqueira and the Espinhaço. He died of malaria in 1681, before even coming into contact with the watercourse. On the other hand, dispersed fronts of these expeditions managed to find gold in places where they later founded settlements, among them those that gave rise to cities such as Antônio Dias, Caeté, Mariana, Ouro Preto, and Sabará.

Pedro Bueno Cacunda, a miner who also traveled along the courses of the Guandu and Manhuaçu rivers, succeeded in reaching the upper Doce River in search of areas for the expansion of mining in the 18th century. In this endeavor, he encouraged settlement at the river's headwaters, bringing indigenous people with him to assist in the work and persuade other indigenous people so that he could advance. In that century, with the use of heavy metals for mining at the headwaters of watercourses in the basin, especially in Ouro Preto, Mariana, and Santa Bárbara, the process of degradation of the Doce River began. However, the discovery of rich gold deposits in the central region of Minas Gerais, in an area running from São João del-Rei to Minas Novas, concentrated the interest of outsiders there and in neighboring regions from the 17th century onward. Outside these domains they were called the backlands, among them the "Backlands of the Doce River", just as there also existed the "Eastern Backlands" (Zona da Mata Mineira) and the "Backlands of the São Francisco".

=== From forbidden river to a massacre ===
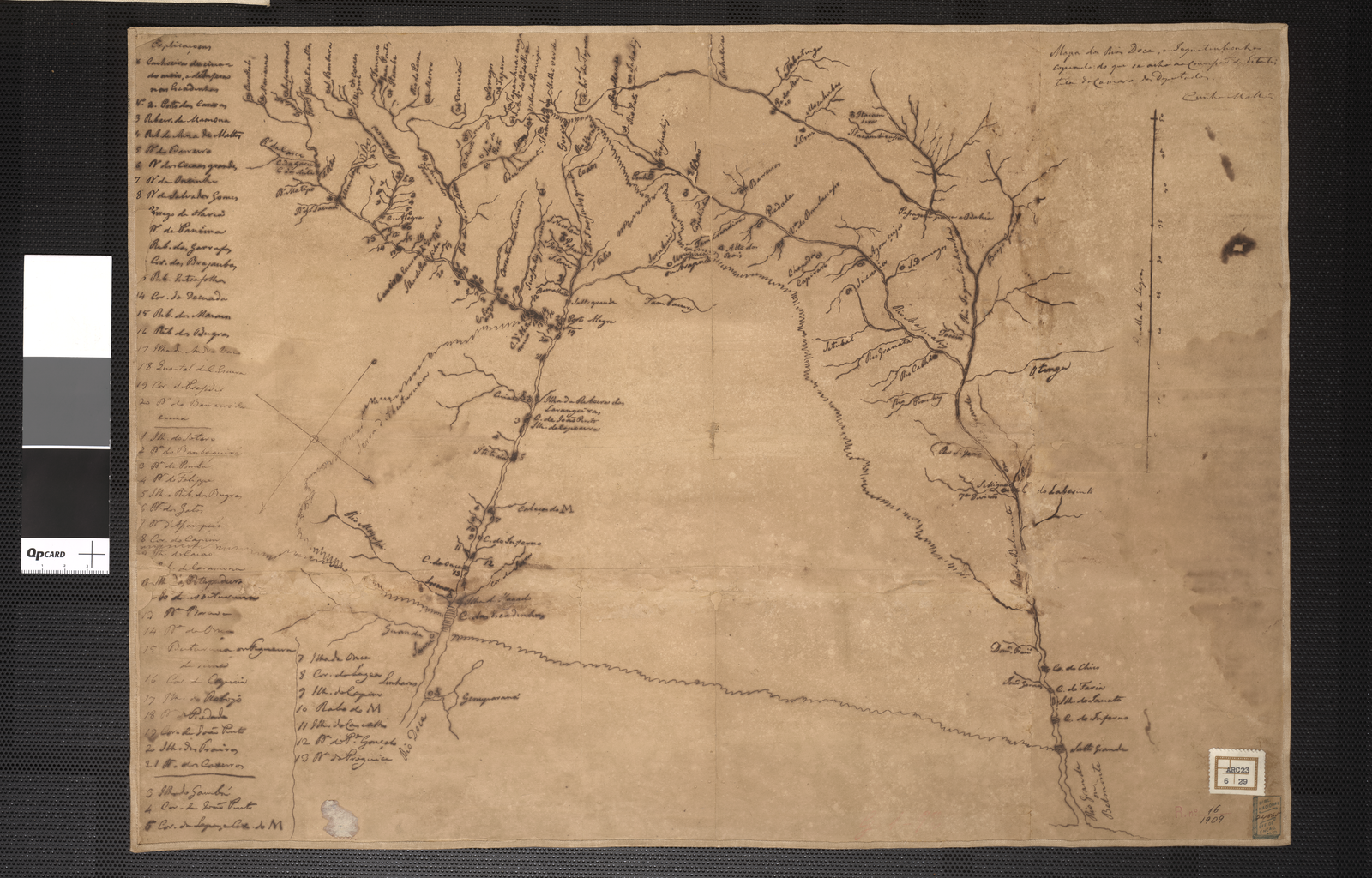
Map showing the Doce and Jequitinhonha rivers, by Raimundo José da Cunha Matos, dated to the 19th century.

To protect the gold reserves, settlement and the opening of new trails through the Doce River valley were at one time prohibited by the Portuguese Crown, as a way of preventing the smuggling of gold by means of the Doce River and its tributaries. With the intention of keeping outsiders away, these were said to be lands with dense vegetation and venomous animals, with the predominance of the ferocity of the native peoples. However, settlement was permitted in 1755, after Minas Gerais went through a decline in gold production. Even with the reduced availability of gold, mineral diversity favored the development of mining activity in the following centuries in the region of some headwaters of the upper Doce River, such as in Mariana.

By 1808, 26 explorers had traveled along the Doce River, all in search of precious stones, in vain. Despite the permission for settlement, attacks by Botocudos (as the Aimorés were called) on outsiders were becoming frequent, which led the government of the Minas Gerais Province to demand action from the Portuguese Crown. In addition, the Backlands of the Doce River in Minas Gerais and their extension in Espírito Santo were one of the only regions of Brazil still totally dominated by natives, outside the control of the Portuguese administration, so it was in its interest to demonstrate power through taking control. As a result, "quartels" were created along the course of the Doce River with the objective of strengthening protection for the colonists. The Royal Charter of May 13, 1808 also determined an offensive war against the native population, authorizing their extermination, as the government of Minas Gerais desired.

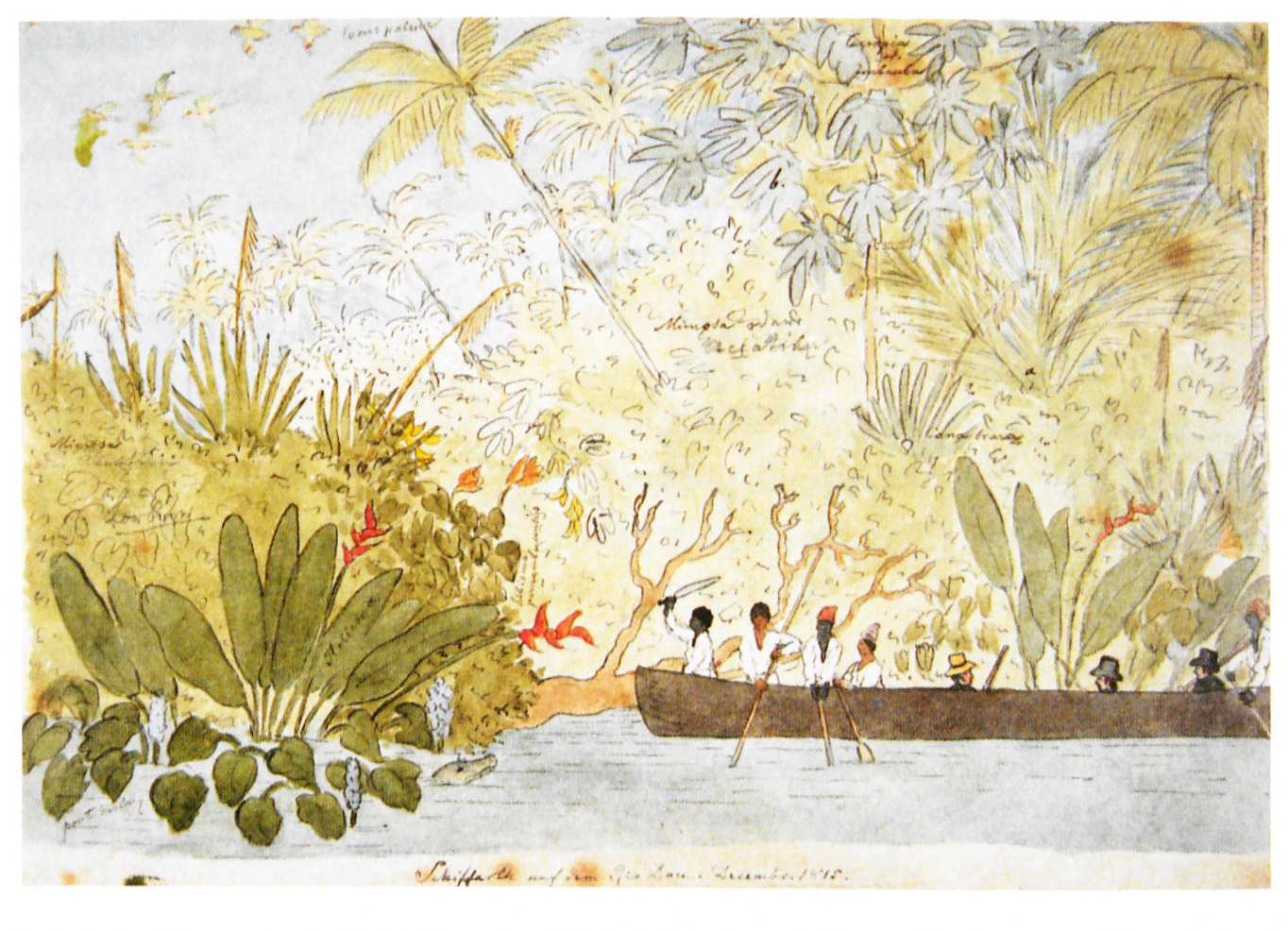
Illustration of the entourage of the Rhenish prince Maximilian zu Wied-Neuwied on the Doce River in 1815

In 1823, Guido Marlière, a French military officer, took over the Directorate of Indians in the Province of Minas and promoted dialogue with the indigenous people in place of systematic massacre. By this point, the conflicts against the indigenous people were out of control even for the crown's military divisions, so Marlière was entrusted with the objective of pacification. Earlier, in 1813, the Frenchman had already succeeded in pacifying natives and colonists in the Zona da Mata Mineira. Already on the Doce River, he transformed the quartels into food distribution centers. Despite the prohibition of attacks on indigenous people in 1831, the local peoples were already practically extinct, which served as an incentive for colonization. Even so, this process continued to occur relatively slowly.

The Krenak people who inhabit the left bank of the Doce River in Resplendor are the greatest concentration of heirs of the surviving Aimorés. In contrast with the massacre of the natives, the 19th century is also marked by the first expeditions that intended to research the natural aspects of the Doce River and the related cultures. In 1815, the Rhenish prince Maximilian zu Wied-Neuwied traveled through the region to come into contact with the culture of the indigenous people. This visit resulted in studies that contributed to demystifying the ferocity of these peoples. The German botanist Friedrich Sellow, who became known for sending thousands of samples of animals and plants from South America for study in Berlin, died after falling into the waters of the Doce River during his research work in 1831, near Belo Oriente. Princess Therese of Bavaria was also on the Doce River to collect fauna samples in 1888.

=== Population expansion ===
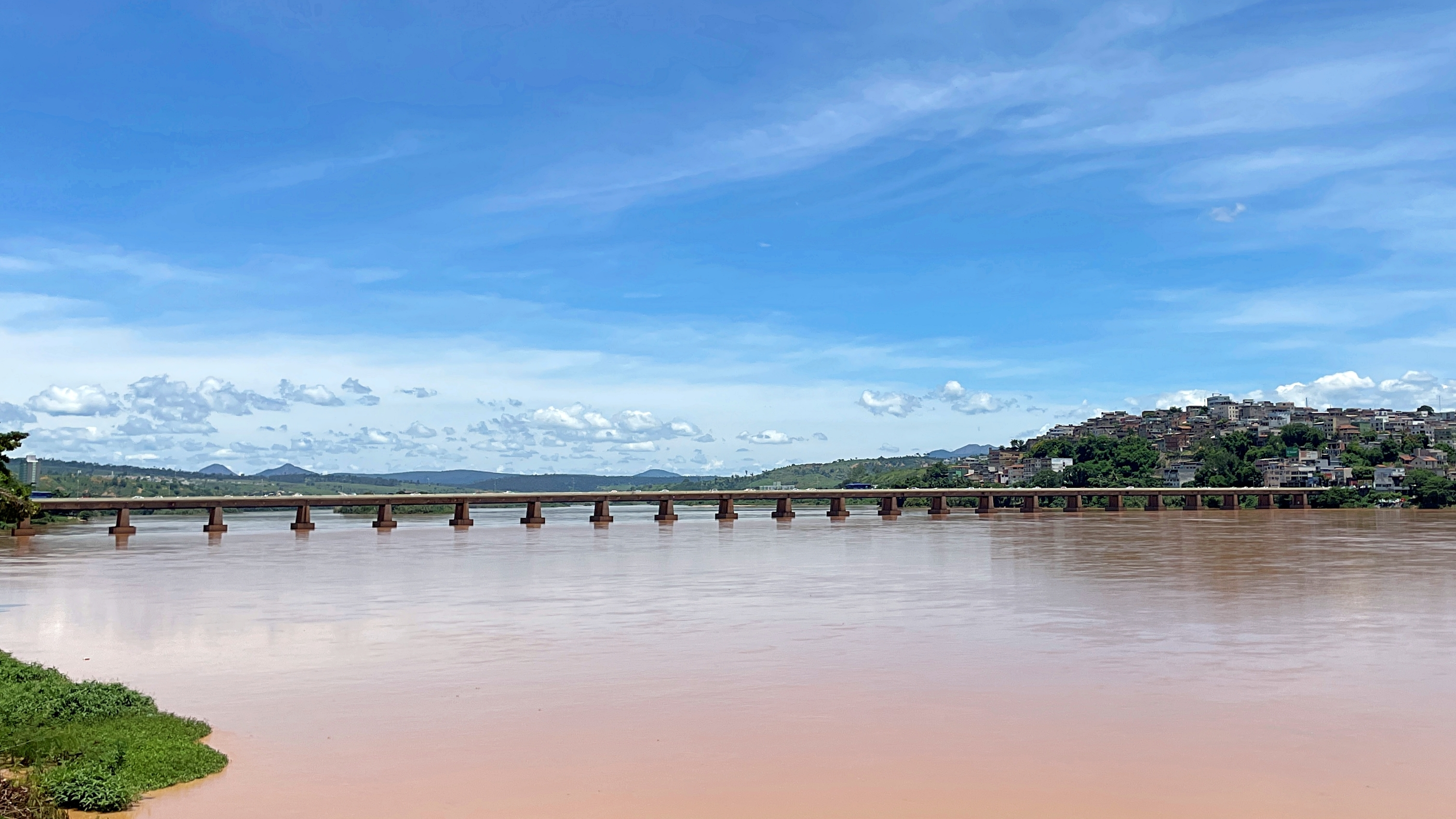
The Florentino Avidos Bridge in Colatina, inaugurated in 1928, was the first major road bridge over the Doce River.

In 1900, settlement of the middle and lower Doce River was still almost nonexistent. Some of the old quartels gave rise to settlements, while ports were formed for the exchange of goods involving agricultural and livestock products, as in the case of the Port of Figueira do Rio Doce, which later gave rise to Governador Valadares, and Colatina. However, it was only with the construction of the Vitória to Minas Railway (EFVM) that urban nuclei began to consolidate and expand. Following the course of the watercourse between Colatina and the present Steel Valley in several stretches, the railway line was responsible for attracting workers and forming cities from where railway stations were built.

From 1900 to 1920, the population of the "Forest Zone" of Minas Gerais, corresponding to the valleys of the Doce, São Mateus, and Mucuri rivers, grew 467%, with the Vitória to Minas Railway being the main reason for this increase. At the same time that the route of the railway line advanced through the Doce River valley, vast lands, until then occupied by virgin forest, began to give way to agriculture and animal husbandry, mainly from the 1920s onward. In addition, the discovery of abundant reserves of iron ore in what would later be called the Quadrilátero Ferrífero led to the establishment of extraction mines.

The creation of the Companhia Vale do Rio Doce (CVRD) – later renamed Vale S.A. – by the government in 1942 aimed to export the iron ore that was extracted from the mining fields in Itabira. Through the railway the production could be transported to the ports of Espírito Santo. Also during the first half of the 20th century, the extraction of wood intended for the production of charcoal began, to supply the industries located in João Monlevade and in the Steel Valley. It was in the State's interest to attract large private investments, so foreign investors were allowed to acquire the lands necessary for them to act. In this sense, Belgo-Mineira and Acesita were the main companies administering land for timber extraction in the Doce River valley.

Northern Espírito Santo also experienced a period of economic rise in the first half of the 20th century due to the expansion of coffee cultivation and timber extraction. The Vitória to Minas Railway provided a means of transporting coffee production from this region starting from Colatina, causing the city to establish itself as a regional center. The inauguration of the Florentino Avidos Bridge, the first major road bridge over the Doce River, dates from 1928. This whole set of factors, which turned toward the use of the region's natural resources and soil for the generation of profit for the State and investors, culminated in the sudden increase of urban populations on the banks of the Doce River and on its tributaries.

=== Environmental decline ===
The prioritization of economic activities, mainly timber extraction and agriculture and livestock raising, were the main causes of the suppression of the native forest of the Doce River basin throughout the 20th century. From then on the watercourse was directly affected both by the removal of riparian forest and by the growth of cities without any urban planning, leading to the unchecked discharge of sewage into its waters.

It was amid the advance of systematic deforestation that Dom Helvécio Gomes de Oliveira began efforts to preserve one of the last large remnants of native Atlantic Forest remaining in the area between the Piracicaba and Doce rivers in the 1930s. In this way, the Rio Doce State Park (PERD) was created on July 14, 1944, the first state park in Minas Gerais. It should be highlighted that the expansion of the Brazilian road network, mainly between the 1930s and 1960s, included the construction of highways crossing the Doce River. Road links favored local economic activities, especially logging and cattle raising.

At the height of timber extraction, in 1950, Governador Valadares had more than 100 sawmills and Linhares more than 130. However, wood for extraction became scarce and the activity began to enter decline in the 1960s. While the sector's businessmen migrated to regions farther north, the local labor force was overcome by unemployment and forced to migrate to other regions in search of work. This was reflected in the stagnation of population growth in the region, while investments attracted by industry remained concentrated in their host cities. Later, the lands, once occupied by native forest, were used for extensive cattle raising and reforestation with eucalyptus, with the intention of serving industrial demand. Describing a trip to the Doce River in the magazine O Cruzeiro, in 1961, Rachel de Queiroz highlighted the riverbanks as deforested areas taken over by plantations and charred trunks.

Although the sharp variations in the level of the Doce River between the dry and rainy seasons had been known since before the riverside cities were established, it did not take long for disorderly occupation to be reflected in floods of great proportions, a problem that became recurrent for riverside populations in rainy periods. Media information provides examples of exceptional floods in 1926, described as the largest in 20 years, and 1944, when 2,000 families were left homeless in Colatina alone. However, the worst of them, during the rains of 1979, left 74 people dead and 47,776 homeless, in addition to 36 km of the EFVM flooded by the waters. In January 1997, another flood of great proportions left 57,705 homeless and two dead. From 1973 to 2003, at least 12 major flood events were recorded.

The actions of the Serviço Especial de Saúde Pública (SESP) brought investments in sanitation, drainage, and the reorganization of the urban space of Governador Valadares in the 1940s, being effective in combating malaria, paving roads, and cleaning watercourses, but it was insufficient to meet the demand of urban growth in the following decades and flooding problems became recurrent in the lower areas of the city. In turn, the construction of the Mascarenhas Hydroelectric Power Plant, in Baixo Guandu, which entered operation in 1972, began manipulations of the level and flow of the waters of the Doce River.

=== The impacted river ===
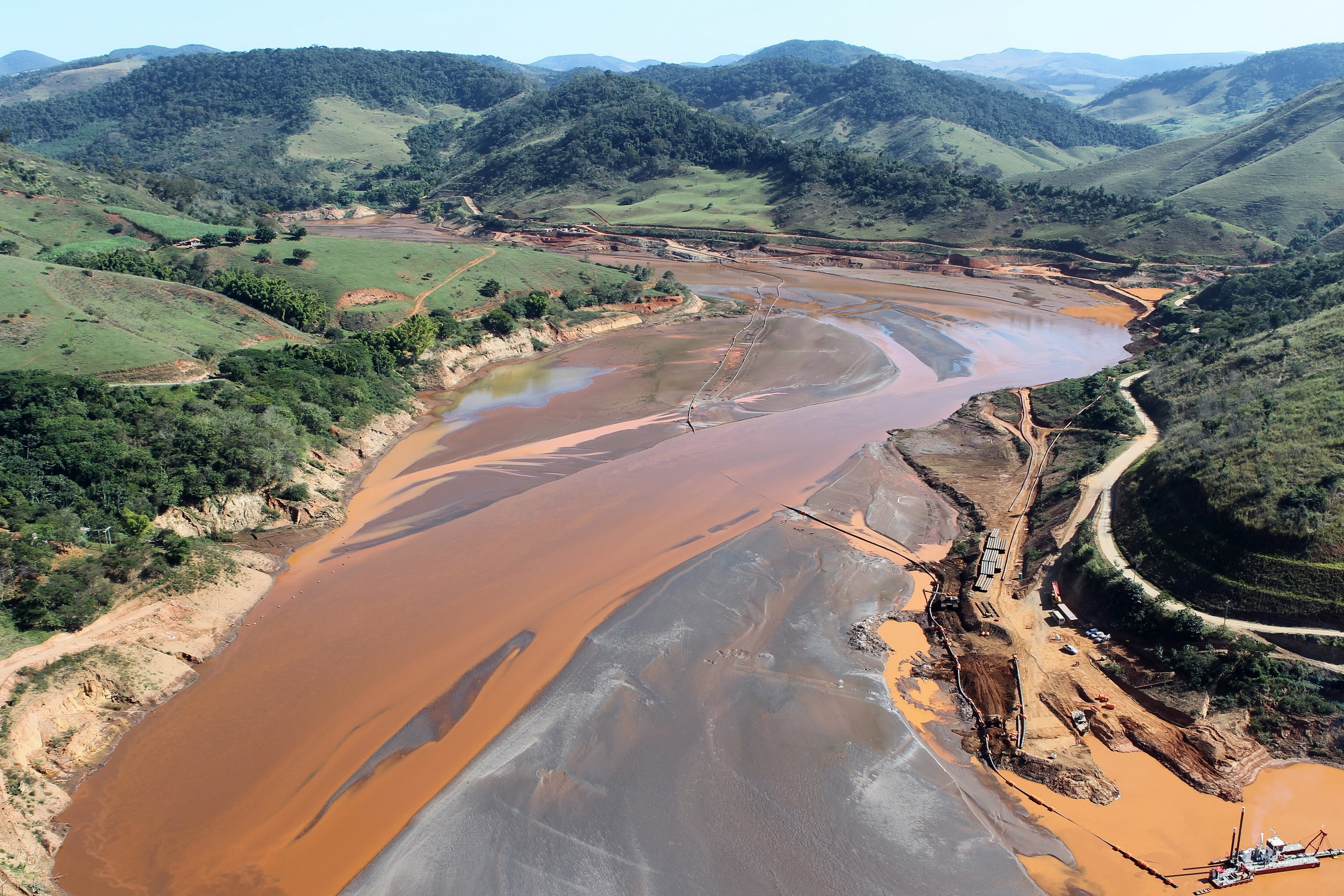
Reservoir of the Risoleta Neves Hydroelectric Power Plant affected by the Mariana dam disaster in 2015. Photograph from July 2016.

After the 1979 flood, monitoring operations of the level of the Doce River by public agencies were begun, through rainfall and river-gauging stations. However, concern for the conservation of the river only intensified between the end of the 20th century and the beginning of the 21st, because environmental problems were affecting the cities of the basin ever more intensely. Within the context of paying attention to water conditions there was the creation of the Comitê da Bacia Hidrográfica do Rio Doce (CBH-Doce) and the consolidation of committees in sub-basins from 2002 onward. Coverage by sewage treatment plants expanded, but timidly, reaching 10% of the basin's cities with some type of urban sewage treatment in 2010.

In the 2010s, as a result of the droughts in Southeastern Brazil, the Doce River went through an unprecedented situation of water scarcity.

Already severely corrupted, the Doce River course was invaded by the mud from the mining tailings dam of Samarco (a subsidiary of Vale S.A.) that burst in Mariana on November 5, 2015.

== Bibliography ==
- Consórcio Ecoplan-Lume (2010). Plano Integrado de Recursos Hídricos da Bacia Hidrográfica do Rio Doce (Report). Belo Horizonte: Comitê da Bacia Hidrográfica do Rio Doce.
- ANA (2016). Conjuntura dos Recursos Hídricos no Brasil: Região Hidrográfica do Atlântico Sudeste (Report). Brasília: Agência Nacional de Águas.
- Dallapicola, Renata (2015). Desnaturalização e território: transformações socioambientais na bacia do Rio Doce. Vitória: Universidade Federal do Espírito Santo.
- Espíndola, Haruf Salmen (2015). Vale do Rio Doce: formação histórica e transformações socioambientais. Anápolis: Editora Unievangélica.
- Espíndola, Haruf Salmen (2021). História do Rio Doce. Governador Valadares: Editora Univale.
- Rosado Alves, Lucas (2020). Peixes e pesca na bacia do Rio Doce. Vitória: Editora UFES.
- Moreira, Eduardo (2020). Os Krenak e o Rio Doce: território, memória e resistência. Belo Horizonte: Editora UFMG.
- Coelho, André Luiz Nascentes (2006). Degradação ambiental na bacia do Rio Doce (Report). Brasília: Universidade de Brasília.
- Milanez, Bruno; Losekann, Cristiana (2017). Desastre no Vale do Rio Doce: antecedentes, impactos e ações sobre a destruição. Rio de Janeiro: Folio Digital.
- Marinato, Francisco (2007). Colonização e conflitos no vale do Rio Doce. Belo Horizonte: Universidade Federal de Minas Gerais.
- Barbosa, Lúcia Helena (2010). O Vale do Rio Doce na formação territorial de Minas Gerais. Belo Horizonte: Editora PUC Minas.
