= Conselheiro Pena =

Coordinates: 19°10′S 41°28′W

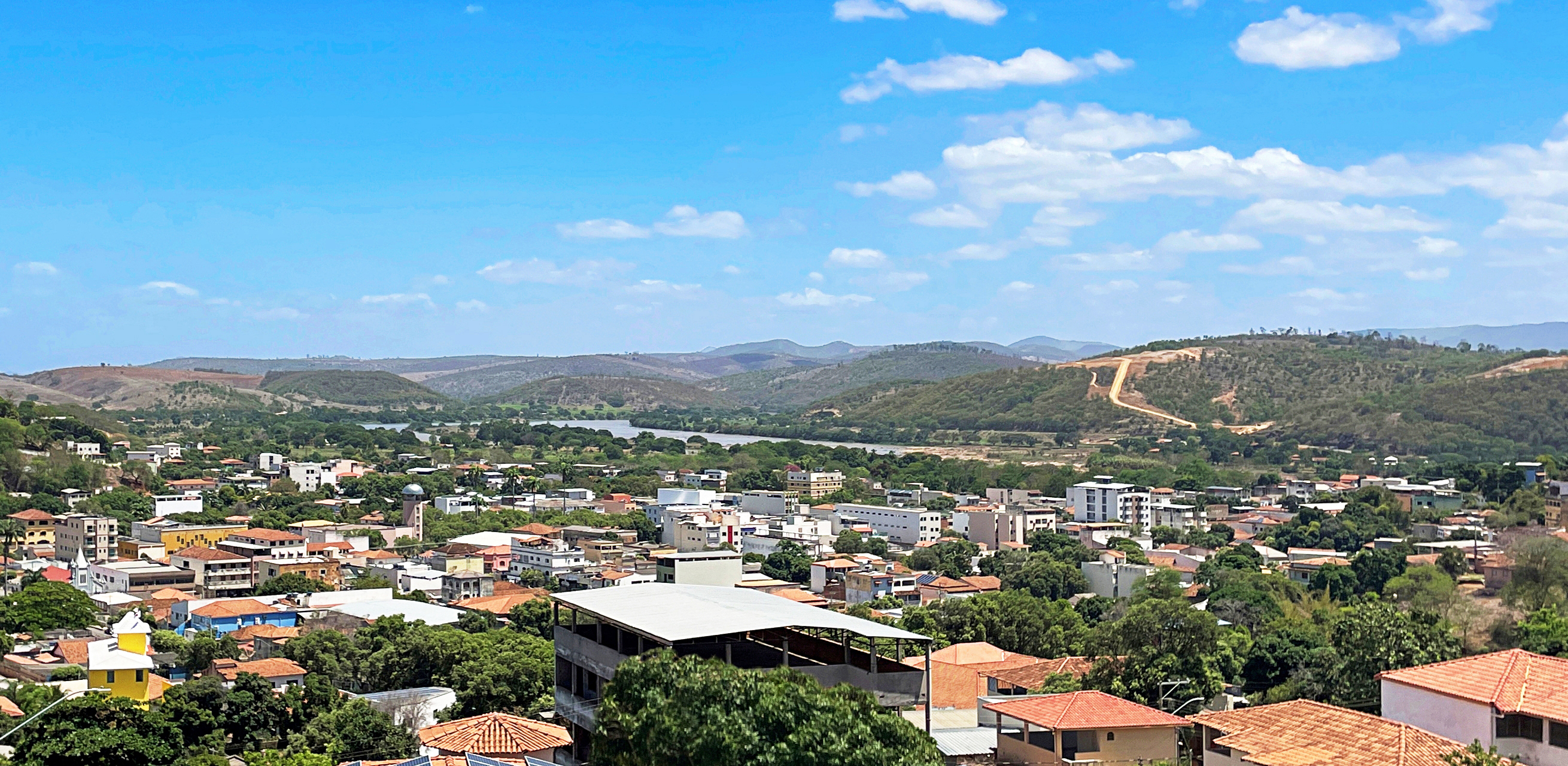
- Partial view

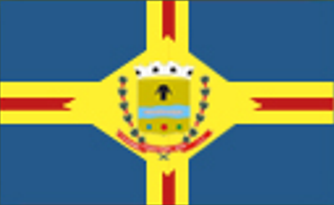
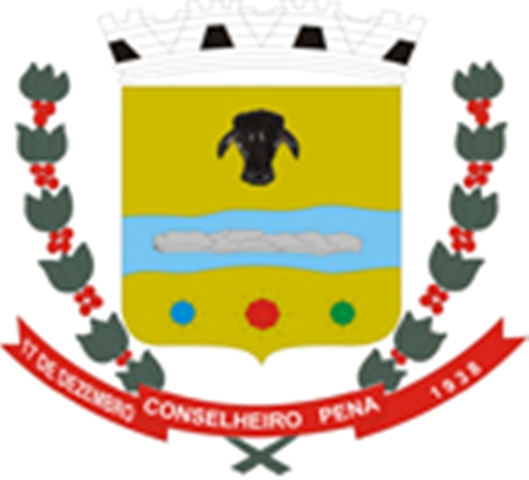
- Flag Coat of arms

- Location in Minas Gerais
- Country: Brazil
- Region: Southeast
- State: Minas Gerais
- Incorporated: December 17, 1938

Government
  - Mayor: Nadia Filomena Dutra Franca (PODE, 2021 - 2024)

Area
  - Total: 1,408.017 km^{2} (543.638 sq mi)

Population (2022 Census)
  - Total: 20,824
  - Estimate (2025): 21,052
  - Density: 14.6/km^{2} (38/sq mi)
- Time zone: UTC−3 (BRT)
- Website: Official website

Conselheiro Pena, formerly known as "Lajao", is located in the state of Minas Gerais, Brazil. This town of 20,824 inhabitants as of 2022, was formed alongside the "Rio Doce", or called as Sweet River.

== See also ==
- List of municipalities in Minas Gerais
