= Pingo-d'Água =

- Municipality
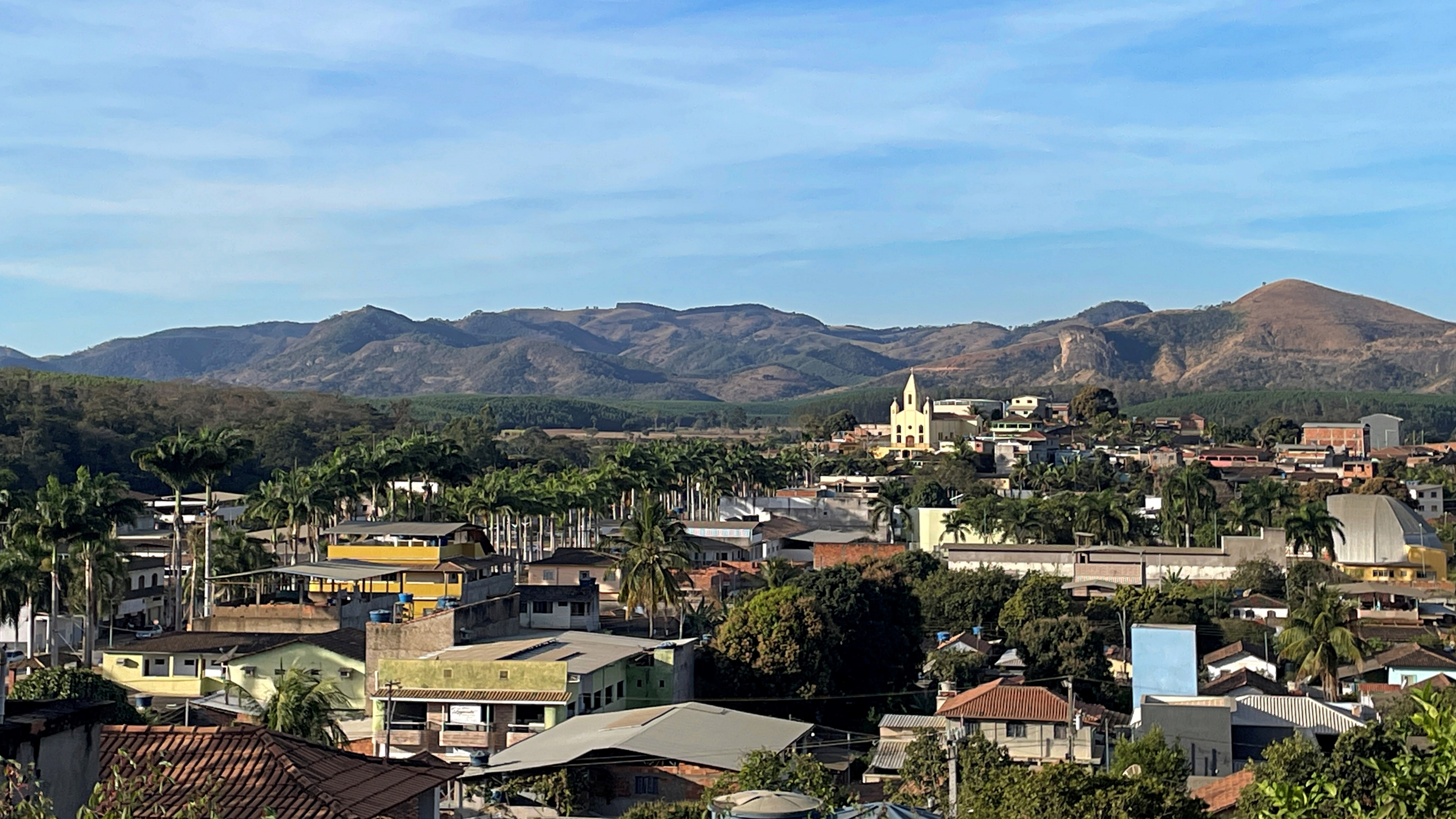
- Partial view of Pingo-d'Água

- Location in Brazil
- Coordinates: 19°43′37″S 42°24′28″W
- Country: Brazil
- Region: Southeast
- State: Minas Gerais
- Mesoregion: Vale do Rio Doce

Government
  - Mayor: Artur Marquiole (PDT)

Population (2020)
  - Total: 4,986
- Time zone: UTC−3 (BRT)

Pingo-d'Água is a municipality in the state of Minas Gerais in the Southeast region of Brazil.

== See also ==
- List of municipalities in Minas Gerais
