= Tumiritinga =

Coordinates: 18°58′S 41°38′W

- Municipality
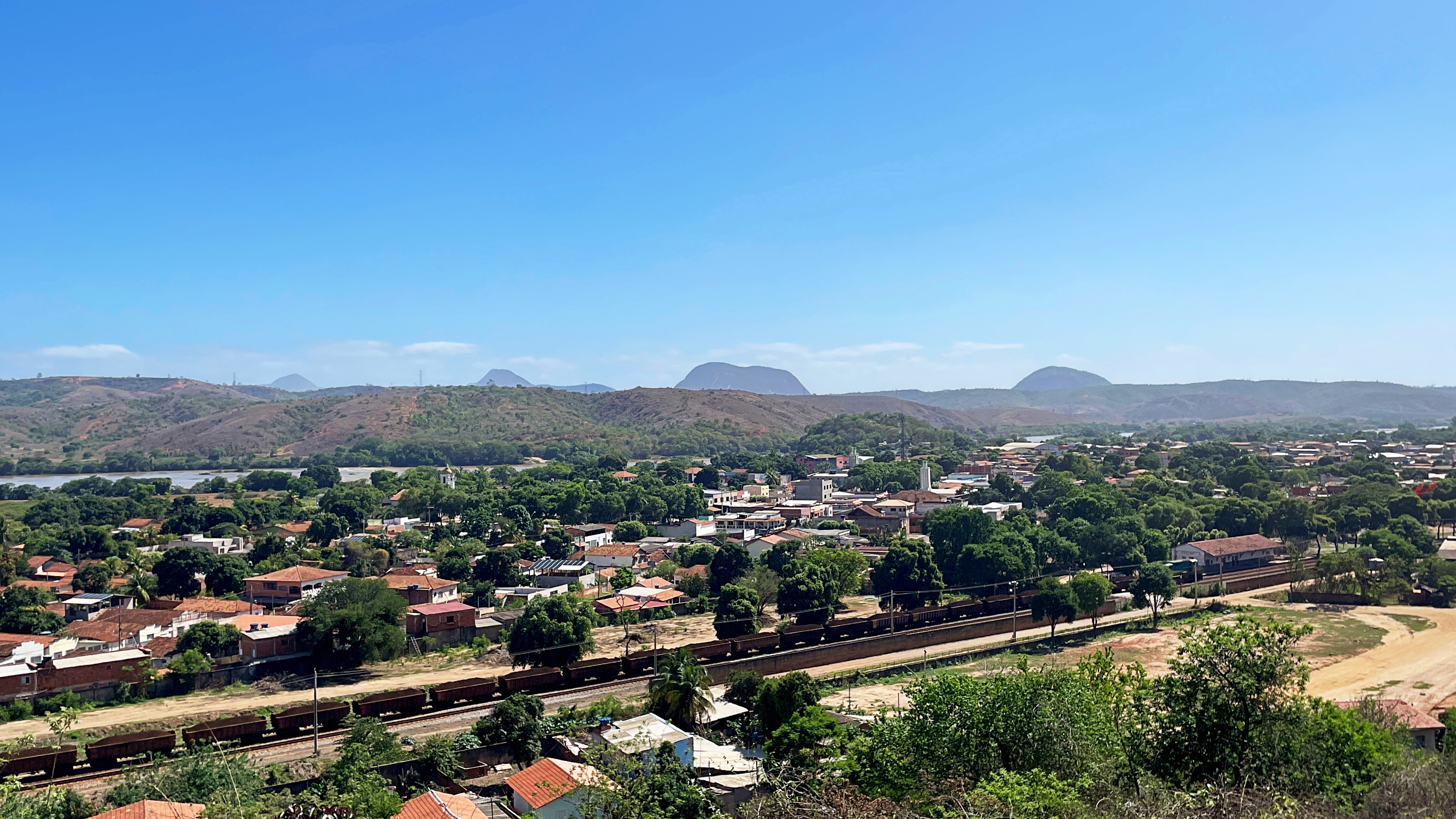
- Partial view of Tumiritinga

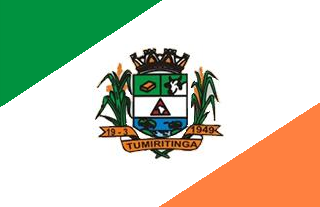
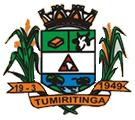
- Flag Coat of arms

- Localization of Tumiritinga
- Country: Brazil
- Region: Southeast
- State: Minas Gerais
- Mesoregion: Vale do Rio Doce
- Microregion: Governador Valadares

Population (2022 Census)
  - Total: 5,886
  - Estimate (2025): 5,955
- Time zone: UTC−3 (BRT)

Tumiritinga is a municipality in the state of Minas Gerais in the Southeast region of Brazil.

== See also ==
- List of municipalities in Minas Gerais
