= Resplendor =

Coordinates: 19°20′S 41°15′W

Resplendor (Lekajville)
- Municipality
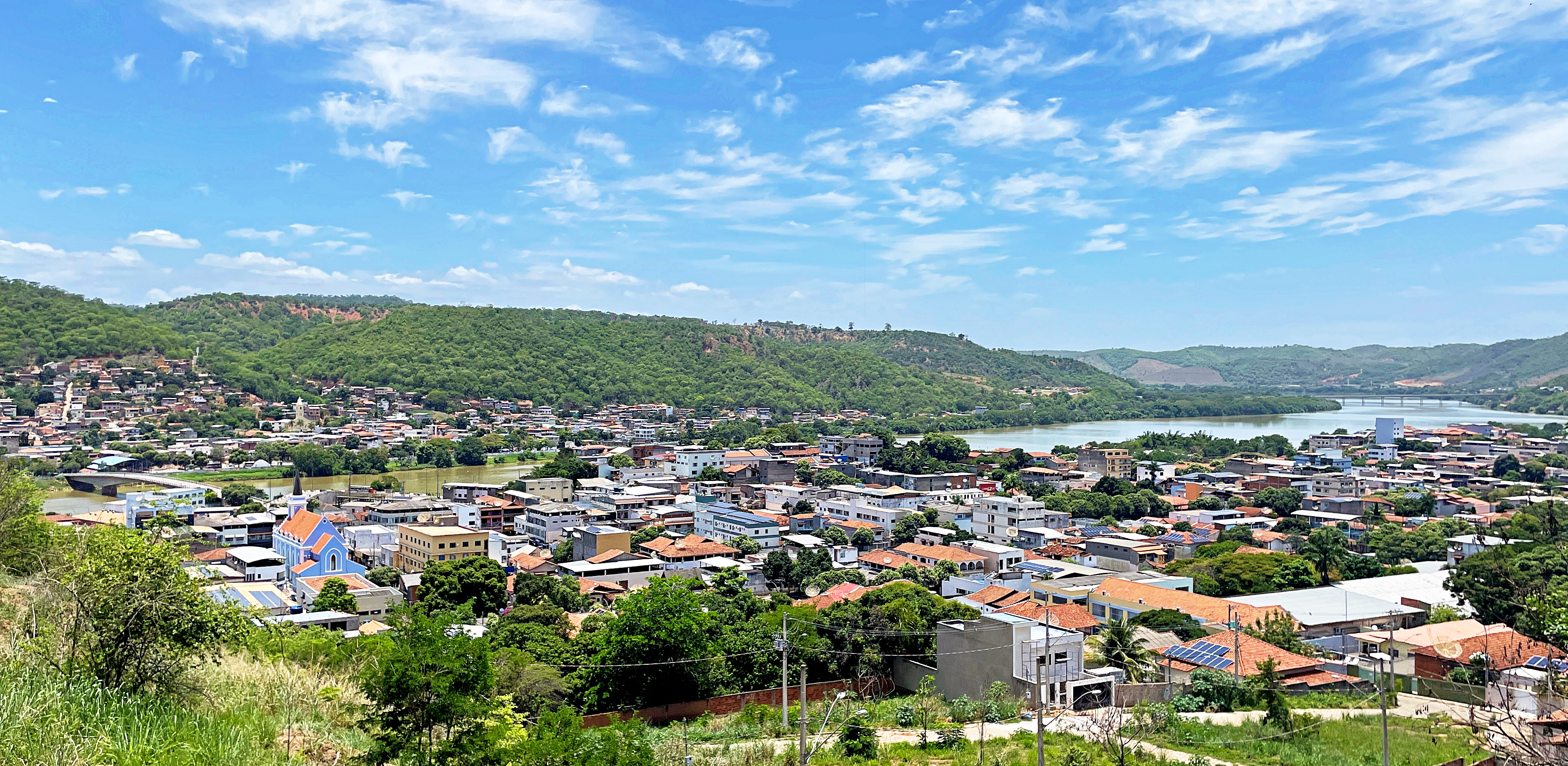
- Partial view of Resplendor

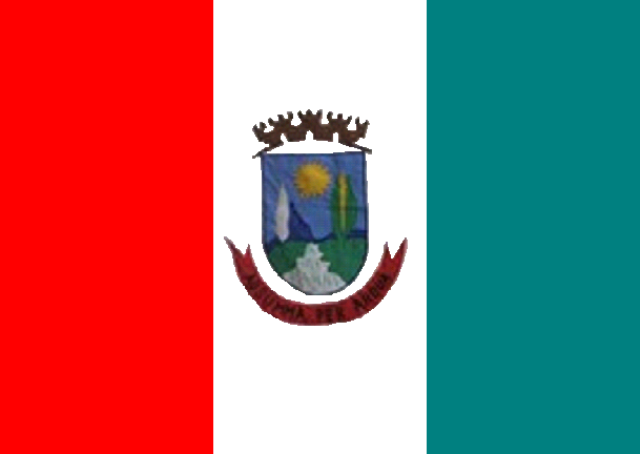
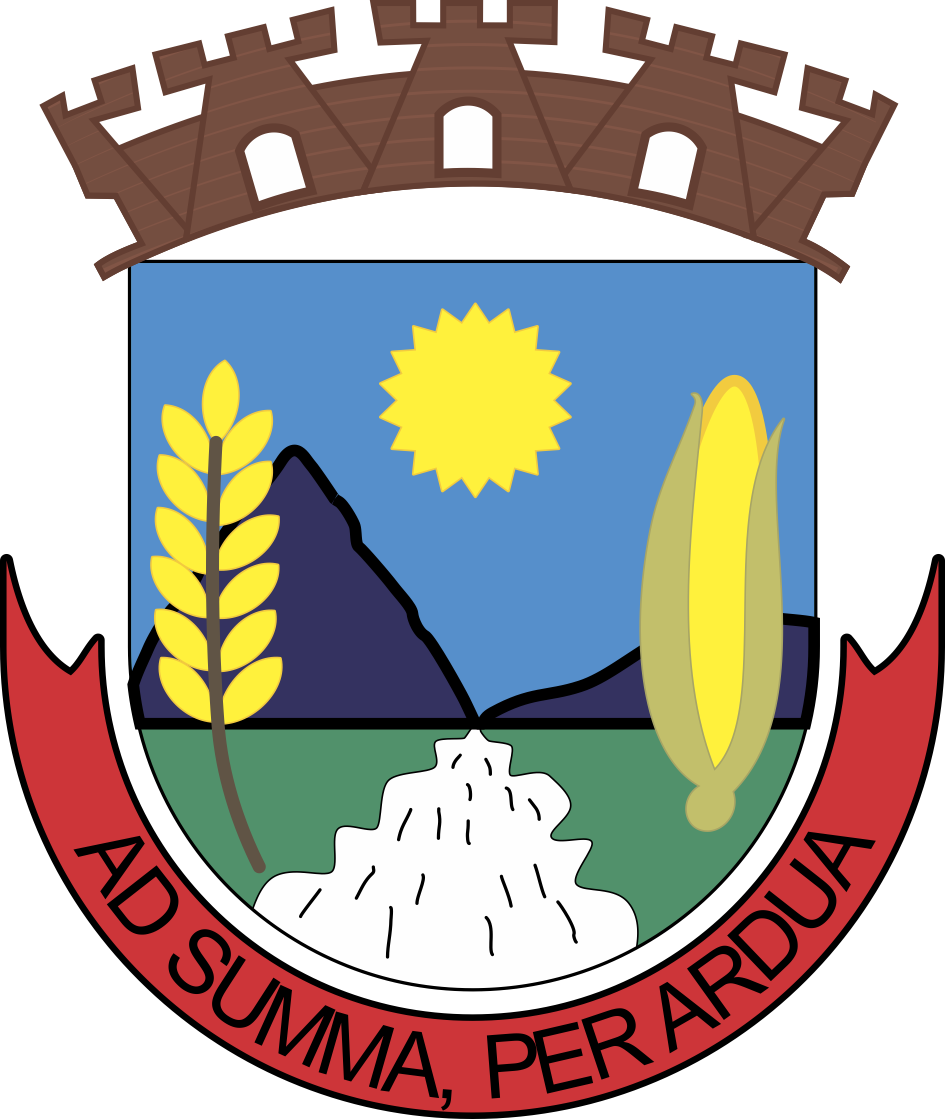
- Flag Coat of arms

- Localization of Resplendor
- Country: Brazil
- Region: Southeast
- State: Minas Gerais
- Mesoregion: Vale do Rio Doce
- Microregion: Aimorés

Population (2022 Census)
  - Total: 6,055
  - Estimate (2025): 6,234
- Time zone: UTC−3 (BRT)

Resplendor is a municipality in the state of Minas Gerais in the Southeast region of Brazil.

== See also ==
- List of municipalities in Minas Gerais
