= São José do Goiabal =

Human settlement in Brazil

Coordinates: 19°55′44″S 42°42′18″W

- Municipality
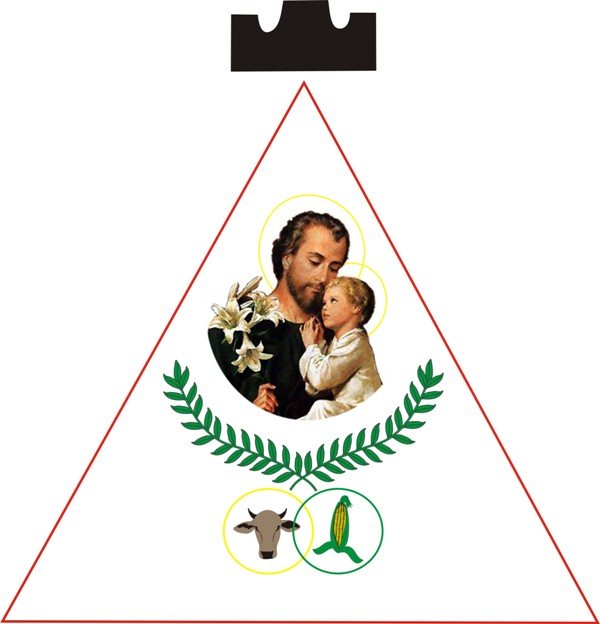
- Coat of arms
- Interactive map of São José do Goiabal
- Country: Brazil
- State: Minas Gerais
- Region: Southeast
- Time zone: UTC−3 (BRT)

Location of São José do Goiabal within Minas Gerais

São José do Goiabal is a Brazilian municipality located in the state of Minas Gerais. The city belongs to the mesoregion Metropolitana de Belo Horizonte and to the microregion of Itabira. As of 2020, the estimated population was 5,387.

== See also ==
- List of municipalities in Minas Gerais
