= MG-111 (Minas Gerais highway) =

Highway in Minas Gerais, Brazil

MG-111

Location
- Country: Brazil
- State: Minas Gerais

Highway system
- Highways in Brazil; Federal; Minas Gerais State Highways

The MG-111 is a state highway located in the Brazilian state of Minas Gerais. Its total length is 183.6 km (114.1 mi), and its entire network is paved. Its route starts in Ipanema and ends at the border between the states of Minas Gerais and Rio de Janeiro.

== Route ==
MG-111 passes through the following municipalities:

- Ipanema
- Conceição de Ipanema
- Santana do Manhuaçu
- Manhuaçu
- Reduto
- Manhumirim
- Alto Jequitibá
- Caparaó
- Espera Feliz
- Carangola
- Faria Lemos
- Tombos
