= Immediate Geographic Region of Carangola =

Urban administrative region in Minas Gerais, Brazil

Immediate Geographic Region of Carangola, in the state of Minas Gerais, Brazil.

The Immediate Geographic Region of Carangola is one of the 10 immediate geographic regions in the Intermediate Geographic Region of Juiz de Fora, one of the 70 immediate geographic regions in the Brazilian state of Minas Gerais and one of the 509 of Brazil, created by the National Institute of Geography and Statistics (IBGE) in 2017.

== Municipalities ==
It comprises 9 municipalities.

- Caiana
- Carangola
- Divino
- Espera Feliz
- Faria Lemos
- Orizânia
- Pedra Bonita
- Pedra Dourada
- Tombos
