= 1979 Brazil floods =

Series of events in eastern Brazil

- Date: January 1979–February 1979
- Location: Bahia, Espírito Santo, Minas Gerais in Brazil
- Cause: Large accumulation of rain between January and February
- Deaths: 74 (Minas Gerais and Espirito Santo)
- Property damage: Roads, bridges, and walls destroyed; Paralysis of the EFVM and consequent blockage of the flow of iron ore production; River floods, floods, collapsed barriers

The 1979 Brazil floods were a series of events that primarily affected the states of Minas Gerais, Bahia, and Espírito Santo.

In Minas Gerais and Espírito Santo, the floods occurred after heavy rains hit the states between January and February of that year. It was the largest natural disaster ever recorded in the region, resulting in 47,776 people left homeless, 74 fatalities, and 4,424 homes affected. A 36-kilometer section of the Vitória-Minas Railway (EFVM) was flooded, causing train traffic to be halted for two weeks and leading to the disruption of iron ore extraction. Highways such as BR-101 were also closed. The event had major global repercussions.

The overflow of the São Francisco River that year also caused flooding in Minas Gerais and Bahia. In Bahia, the primary cause of flooding was the overloading of the Sobradinho Dam. As a result, several municipalities along the São Francisco River were inundated.

== Rains ==
The floods were caused by a significant accumulation of rainfall between January and February 1979 in Espírito Santo and throughout the eastern part of the state of Minas Gerais, resulting from 35 consecutive days of intense and continuous rainfall. On 26 January, the rainfall accumulation was 100.8 mm in Bom Jesus do Galho, 128 mm in Nova Era, 109 mm in Dom Cavati, and 114 mm in Colatina. On 30 January, 132.1 mm were recorded in Aimorés and 164 mm in the municipality of Ipanema, where 216.4 mm had already fallen on 26 January, bringing the total monthly accumulation in Ipanema to 722.2 mm. In Itaguaçu, the accumulated rainfall was 104 mm on 19 January and 127 mm on 31 January. On 1 February, Ipanema recorded 81.6 mm, and the municipality of Timóteo received 131.2 mm. On 2 February, 161.2 mm of rain fell in Belo Oriente, 117.4 mm in Dom Cavati, and 108 mm in Ferros. In the capital of Minas Gerais, Belo Horizonte, the total rainfall accumulation for January and February reached 1,239.8 mm.

== Impacts ==
Makeshift shelter at the Exhibition Park during the 1979 Floods

The cities of Linhares, Colatina, Aimorés, Conselheiro Pena, and Governador Valadares, located along the banks of the Doce River, as well as Rio Piracicaba, Nova Era, Timóteo, and Coronel Fabriciano along the Piracicaba River, were the hardest hit. Other affected areas included Caratinga, along the Caratinga River and São João Stream; Manhuaçu, on the Manhuaçu River; Ferros, on the Santo Antônio River; Mariana, on the Carmo River; Frei Inocêncio, on the Suaçuí Grande River; and Itaguaçu, on the Santa Joana River. At least 37 towns were isolated. In Ipatinga, in the Vale do Aço region, the damage was particularly severe: around 10,000 people were left homeless, and 42 people died, most of them buried by a large hillside collapse in the Esperança neighborhood, specifically in an area called Grota do IAPI. Municipalities such as Tumiritinga, Galileia, Itueta, Resplendor, Antônio Dias, Baixo Guandu, Ponte Nova, and Santana do Manhuaçu were also affected.

After the floods, a network of rain and river gauge stations was installed in various municipalities to warn the population of potential floods. The system was managed by the Companhia de Pesquisa de Recursos Minerais (CPRM). On 6 April 1979, a friendly soccer match between Atlético Mineiro and Flamengo was held at the Maracanã Stadium in Rio de Janeiro to raise funds for the flood victims. The match ended with a 5–1 victory for the Rio de Janeiro team, with Pelé playing a special role.

With the flooding of the São Francisco River, several municipalities in Minas Gerais and Bahia were also inundated. Affected areas included Pirapora, Montes Claros, Januária, São Romão, Malhada, Paratinga, and Xique-Xique.

== Succeeding ==
In January 1997, major floods hit several cities in Minas Gerais, Espírito Santo, and Rio de Janeiro following continuous rainfall. The floods resulted in 82 deaths, with 11,750 houses damaged and another 1,857 destroyed, affecting 175 municipalities. In Governador Valadares, a large part of the city was flooded by the Doce River, marking the second-worst flood in the city's history, after the 1979 disaster. The third worst flood occurred in 2012, when the river reached four meters and thirteen centimeters above its normal level on 6 January of that year.

The damage caused by the 2013 floods in southeastern Brazil, however, was comparable to the devastation of 1979, leaving more than 40 people dead and 50,000 people displaced. Over a hundred municipalities in Minas Gerais and Espírito Santo were affected, and a state of emergency was declared across Espírito Santo. In cities such as Barra de São Francisco and Rio Bananal, the damage in 2013 exceeded that of the 1970s.

== See also ==
- 2024 Rio Grande do Sul floods
- 2023 Rio Grande do Sul floods
- 2020 Brazilian floods and mudslides
- 2009 Brazilian floods and mudslides
- 2010 Northeastern Brazil floods
