= Espera Feliz =

Brazilian municipality in the state of Minas Gerais

- Municipality
- Flag Coat of arms
- Interactive map of Espera Feliz
- Country: Brazil
- State: Minas Gerais
- Region: Southeast
- Time zone: UTC−3 (BRT)

Location of Espera Feliz within Minas Gerais

Espera Feliz is a municipality in southeastern Minas Gerais state, Brazil. The altitude is 2,430 m above sea level. Located at 20°39′00″S 41°54′25″W, its neighboring cities are Caiana to the south, Dores do Rio Preto to the east, Divino to the west, Alto Caparaó and Caparaó to the north and Carangola to the southwest.

The citizens are called Esperafelicenses.

== City data ==
- Foundation: December 17, 1938
- Population: 25,122 (2020 est)
- Area: 325.0 km^{2}
- Average temperature: 20 °C
- Nearby cities: Caiana, Dores do Rio Preto, Divino, Alto Caparaó, Carangola and Caparaó.
- Distance from Belo Horizonte: 378 km
- Distance from Rio de Janeiro: 370 km
- Distance from São Paulo: 705 km
- Distance from Brasília: 1,120 km
- Distance from Vitória: 270 km

== History ==
An oral tradition states that, in the second half of the 19th century, an Engineering Commission sent by the Imperial Government of Peter II, camped where the city centre is currently located. Having located several hunted wild, abundant animals in the place, they perceived that the area close to the São João River, where the Pico da Bandeira is currently located, favored hunting. Of the current City, the first inhabited areas were around the current São Sebastião da Barra, six kilometers from the current city centre. The first land proprietor in the place of the current city was the Lieutenant - Colonel Francisco Xavier Hunter Walnut of Gamma. Later Francisco transferred these to Antonio de Oliveira. The latter, without resources to explore the property, transferred it to his brother-in-law Antonio Carlos de Souzain in 1873. The original setting and the fertile land was used for agriculture. Mining would come only in the 20th century. In 1848, Manoel Francisco Pine introduced coffee cultivation in the region. In 1910, with the opening of the railway station, the town received the name Espera Feliz.

In 1915, the headquarters of the São Sebastião da Barra were transferred to the town, returning the denomination from Espera Feliz. In 1923 the town officially assumed its current name. It received city status on 17 December 1938. The local citizens are called esperafelicense. A major factor in local development was The Leopoldina Railway Company Limited (Leopoldina Railway), that reached the place in 1910. For the formation of the town, they had appointed Captain Jose Carlos de Marine Souza, who donated lands for the construction of the first houses, in the place that received the denomination from New Street. In the center of the city, Deoclécio de Lacerda constructed the hotel as the first building. Mrs. Pink Cira of Assis donated lands for the railroad area, the local Station, and the area destined to the Triangle. On the opposing edge of the São João River, Major Francisco Pereira de Souza constructed a group of houses, that received the name from Pereira Street. Maria, the widow of Captain Francisco Gomes Da Silva, donated the Patrimony Of the first church of San Sebastian.

== Administration ==
All territory that today covers the City of Espera Feliz - Minas Gerais, belonged to the Village De Campos of the Goitacazes of the Province of Rio de Janeiro.

== Politics ==
The current mayor is Carlinhos Cabral who was reelected in 2016. The elected mayor for 2021-2024 is Oziel Gomes.

== Economy ==
- Agriculture – production of coffee
- Commerce
- Tourism in Pico da Bandeira

== See also ==
- List of municipalities in Minas Gerais
