= Caparaó National Park =

National park in Brazil

- Parque Nacional do Caparaó
- IUCN category II (national park)
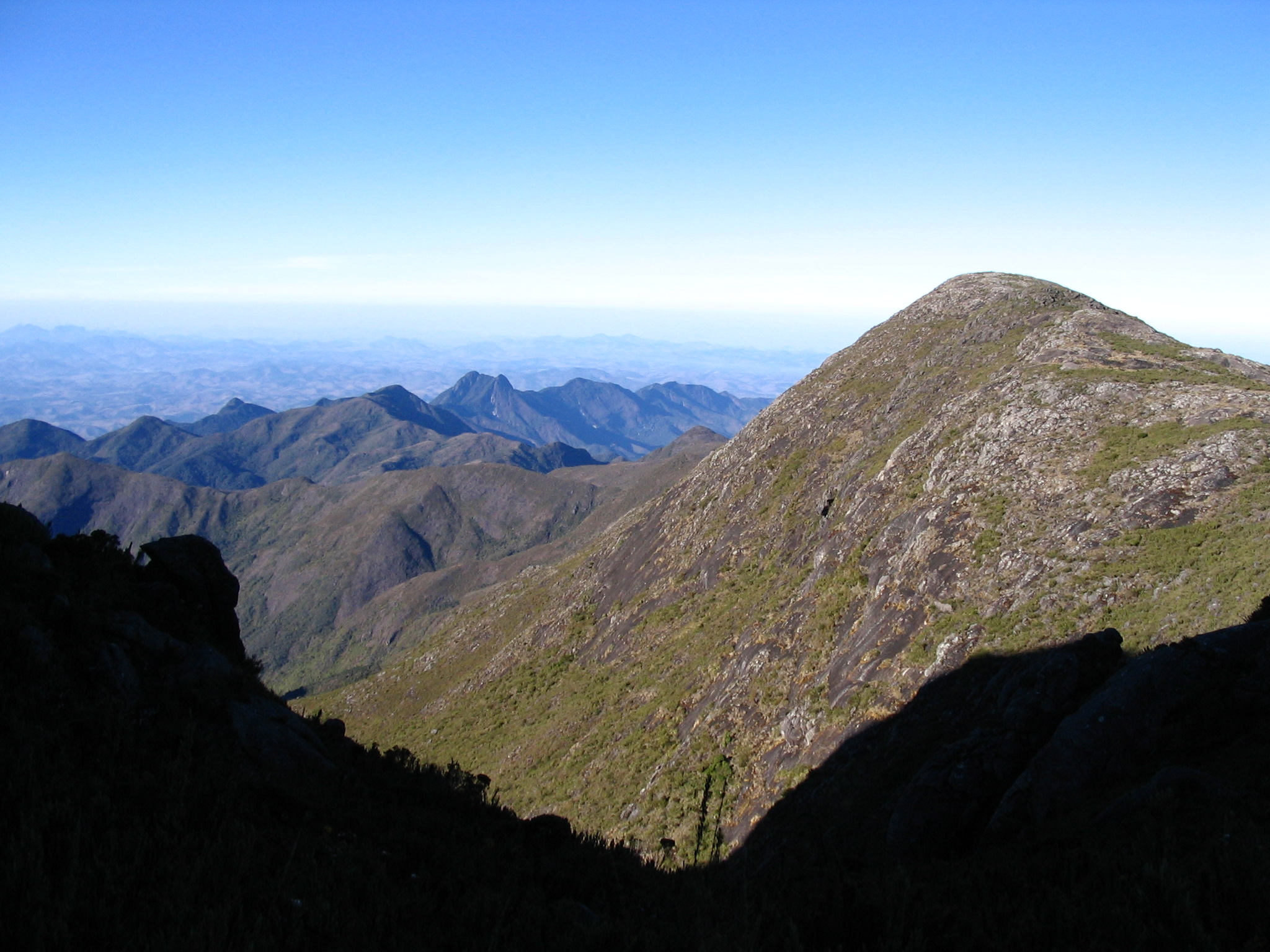
- View towards the southern side of the national park

- Location within Brazil
- Nearest city: Manhuaçu, Minas Gerais
- Coordinates: 20.431°S 41.789°W
- Area: 31,800 hectares (79,000 acres)
- Designation: National park
- Created: 24 May 1961
- Administrator: ICMBio

Caparaó National Park (Portuguese: Parque Nacional do Caparaó) is a national park created in 1961 to protect the Caparaó Mountains, located on the border between Minas Gerais and Espírito Santo states in Brazil. Pico da Bandeira, one of the highest mountains in Brazil, is located there.

== Location ==
The park was created by decree No. 50146 of 24 May 1961. It was created by President Jânio Quadros with an area of about 33,000 hectares (82,000 acres). The purpose was to protect the natural resources and support ecotourism activities. The park lies in the Serra do Caparaó on the border between the states of Minas Gerais and Espírito Santo. It has an area of about 31,800 hectares (79,000 acres), of which 80% is in Espírito Santo. It includes parts of the municipalities of Alto Caparaó, Alto Jequitibá, Caparaó and Espera Feliz in Minas Gerais, and of Dores do Rio Preto, Divino de São Lourenço, Ibitirama, Iúna and Irupi in Espírito Santo. It became part of the Central Atlantic Forest Ecological Corridor, created in 2002.

Altitude ranges from 997 to 2,890 metres (3,271 to 9,482 ft). The park contains the third highest peak in Brazil, the 2,892 metres (9,488 ft) Pico da Bandeira. Ten other peaks are over 2,000 metres (6,600 ft) in altitude. It protects the watersheds of the Itabapoana, Itapemirim and Doce rivers. Annual rainfall is about 1,000 millimetres (39 in). Average temperatures range from 19 to 22 °C (66 to 72 °F), but in winter (June and July) it is common to have temperatures below freezing at the higher altitudes.

== Biota ==
The Serra do Caparaó has a very representative area of Atlantic Forest, with unique examples of alpine meadows. The park has several species of endemic and endangered flora and fauna. On the east side in the state of Espírito Santo the vegetation is mainly tropical rainforest. On the dryer west side in Minas Gerais it has tropical rainforest up to 1,800 metres (5,900 ft), then high-altitude forest with brushwood up to 2,400 metres (7,900 ft), and above that open fields among the rocky outcrops. Plants at higher regions are adapted to stony soils, frost and ice crusts.

Fauna has suffered from hunting, but the park is still home to endangered species such as southern muriqui (Brachyteles arachnoides), maned wolf (Chrysocyon brachyurus) and pampas deer (Ozotocerus bezoarticus). The park also includes species such as the jaguar, tapir, harpy eagle, black-fronted piping guan (Pipile jacutinga) and solitary tinamou (Tinamus solitarius).

== Facilities ==
There is an entrance to the park in the municipality of Alto Caparaó, Minas Gerais, where the park headquarters are, and in the municipality of Dores do Rio Preto, Espírito Santo. The Minas Gerais entrance was inaugurated in September 1998. The visitor centre has space for exhibitions, and auditorium with capacity for 64 people, toilets, a souvenir shop and snack bar. Access to the park is controlled. Visitors may not bring domestic animals, hunting or fishing equipment, may not collect plants, fruit, animals or stones, and may not use two-wheeled vehicles. There is an extensive network of hiking trails and four camping area for visitors with bathrooms and other facilities.

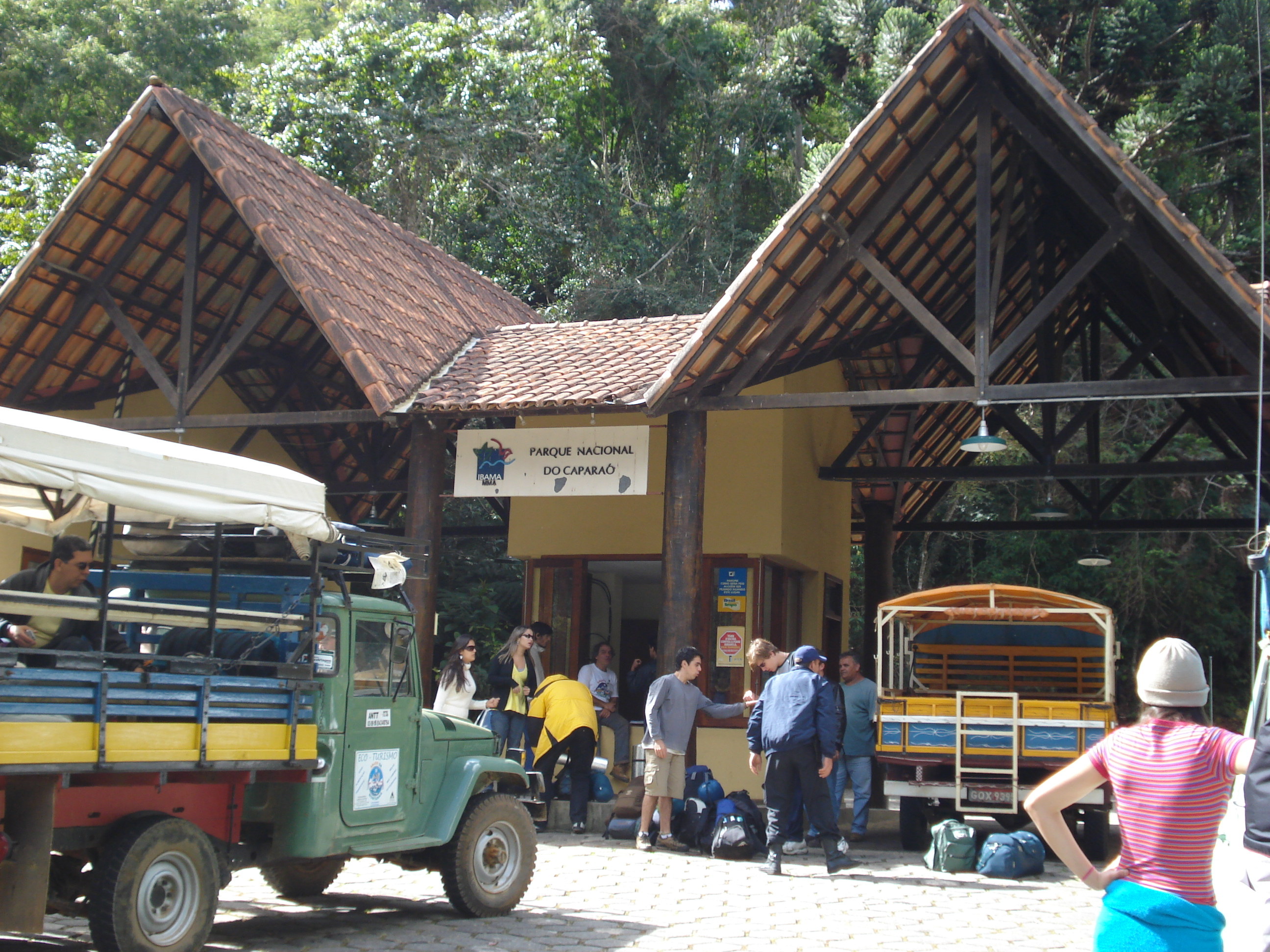
Minas Gerais entrance

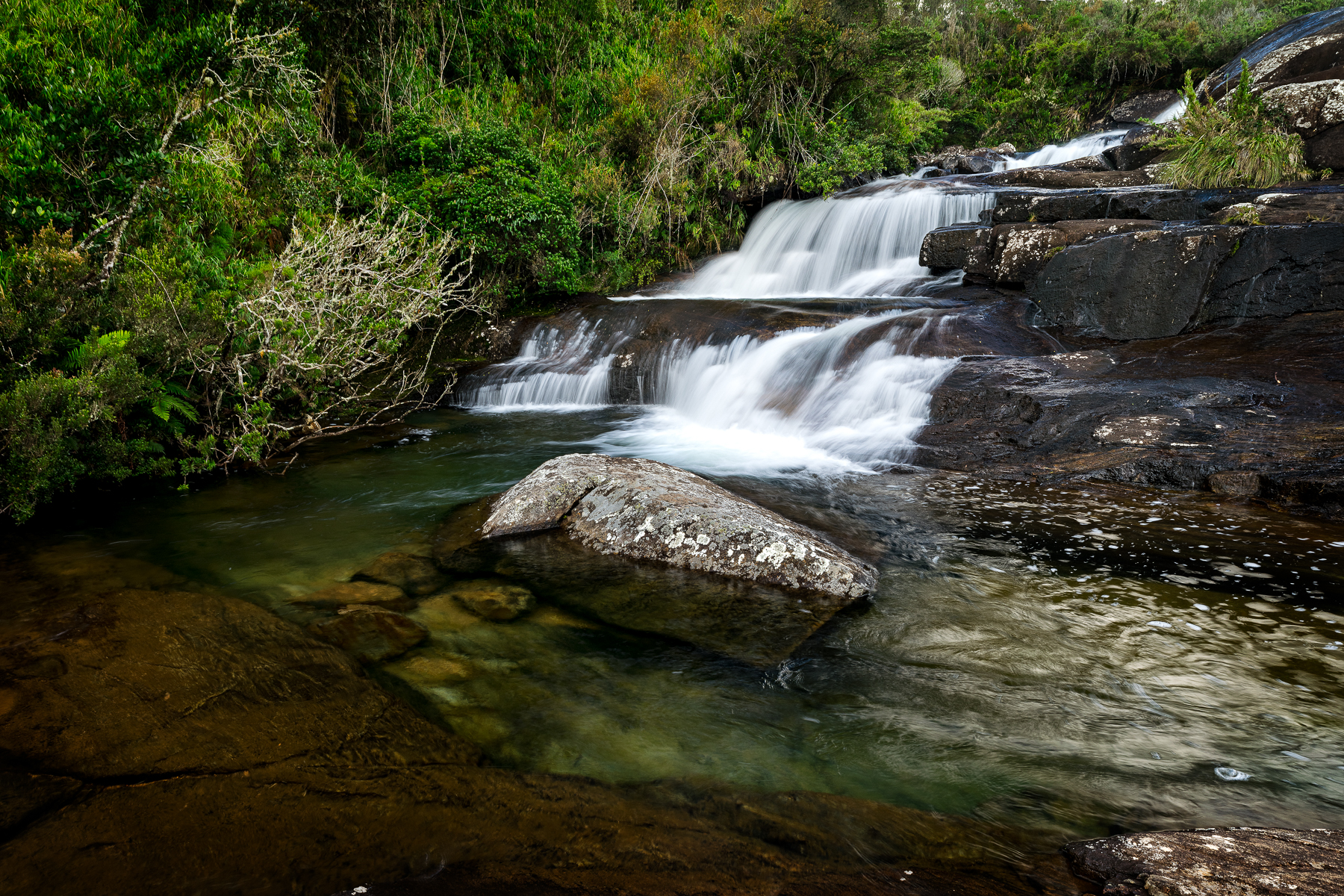
Farofa waterfall

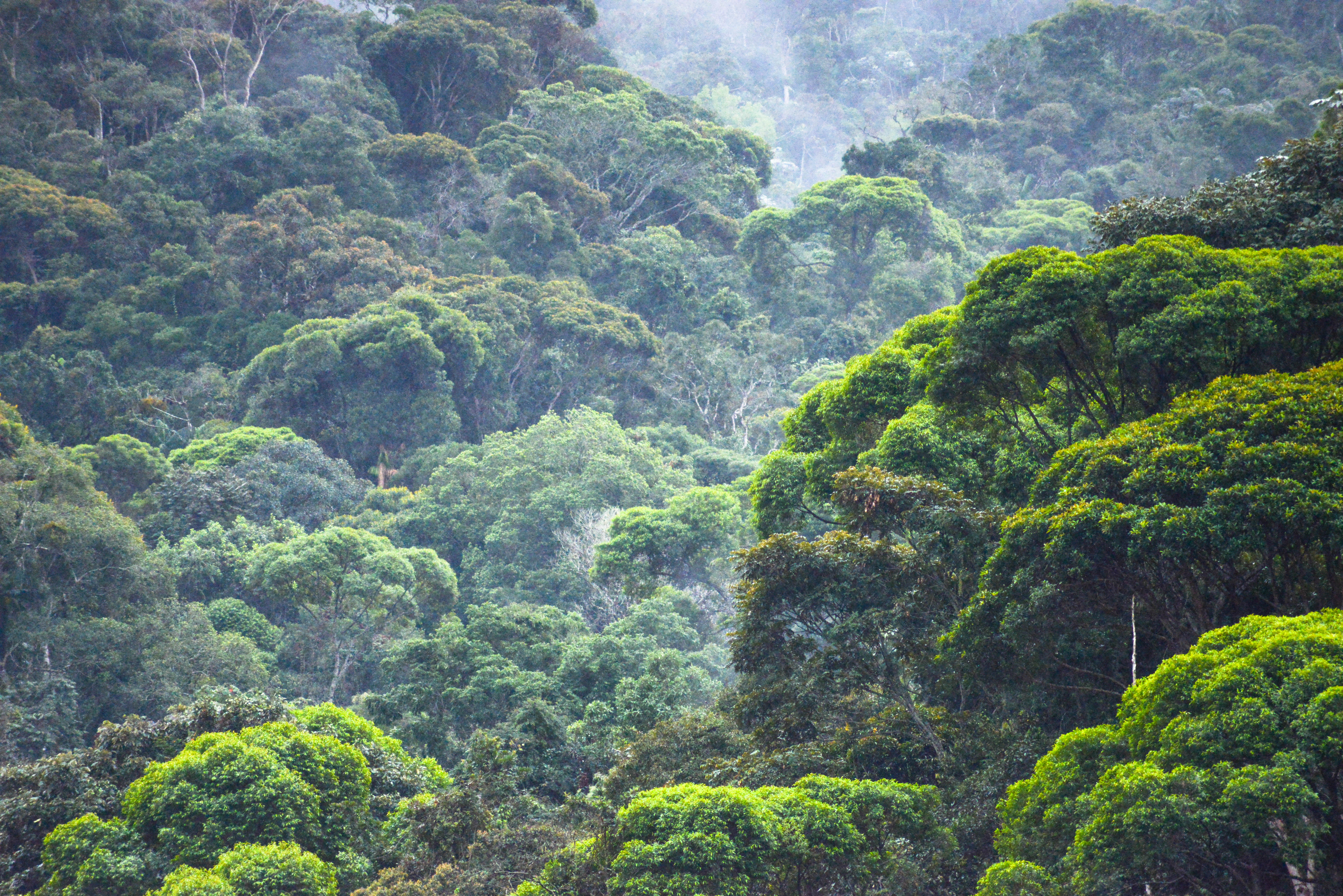
Atlantic rain forest

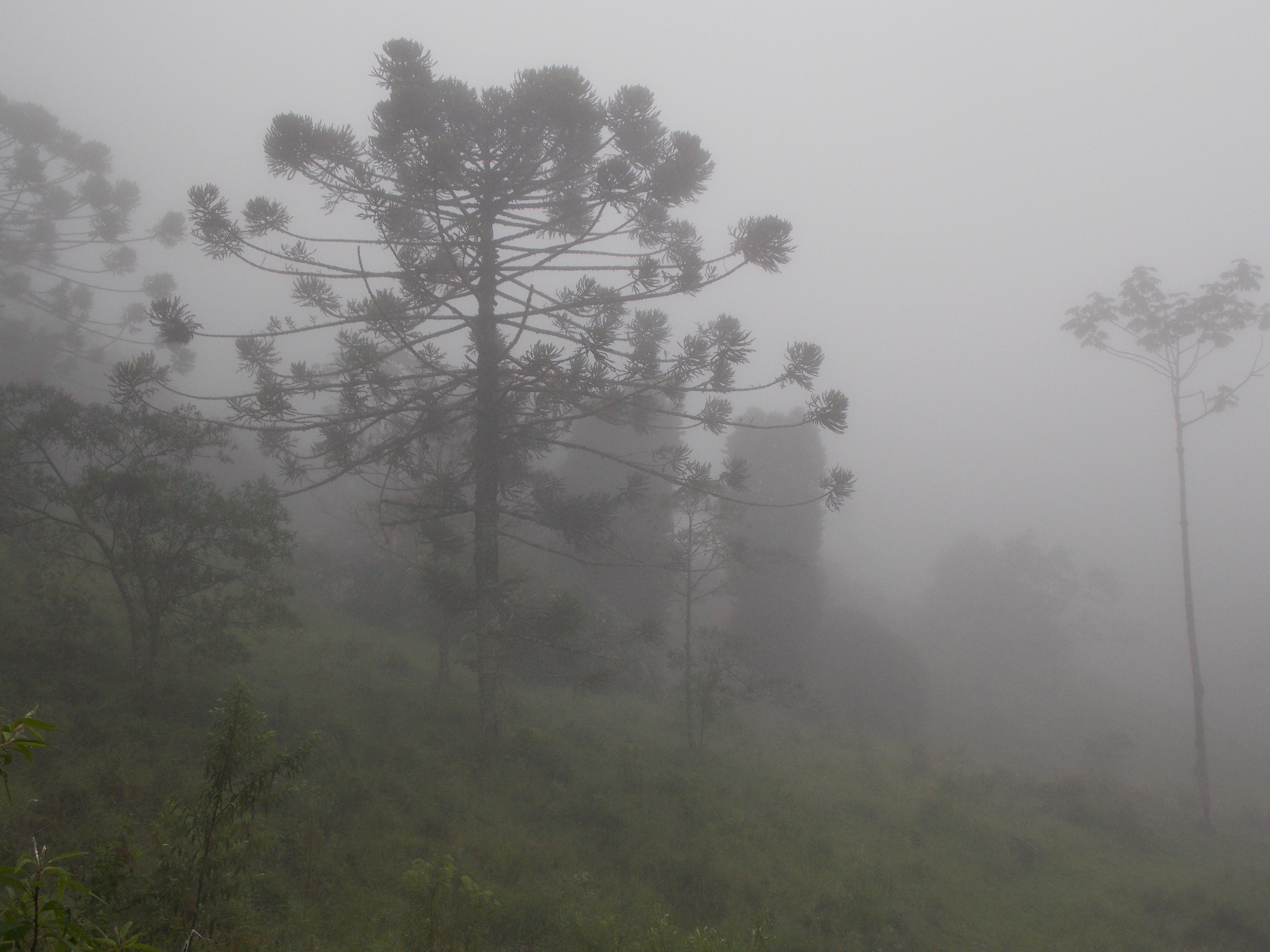
Araucária

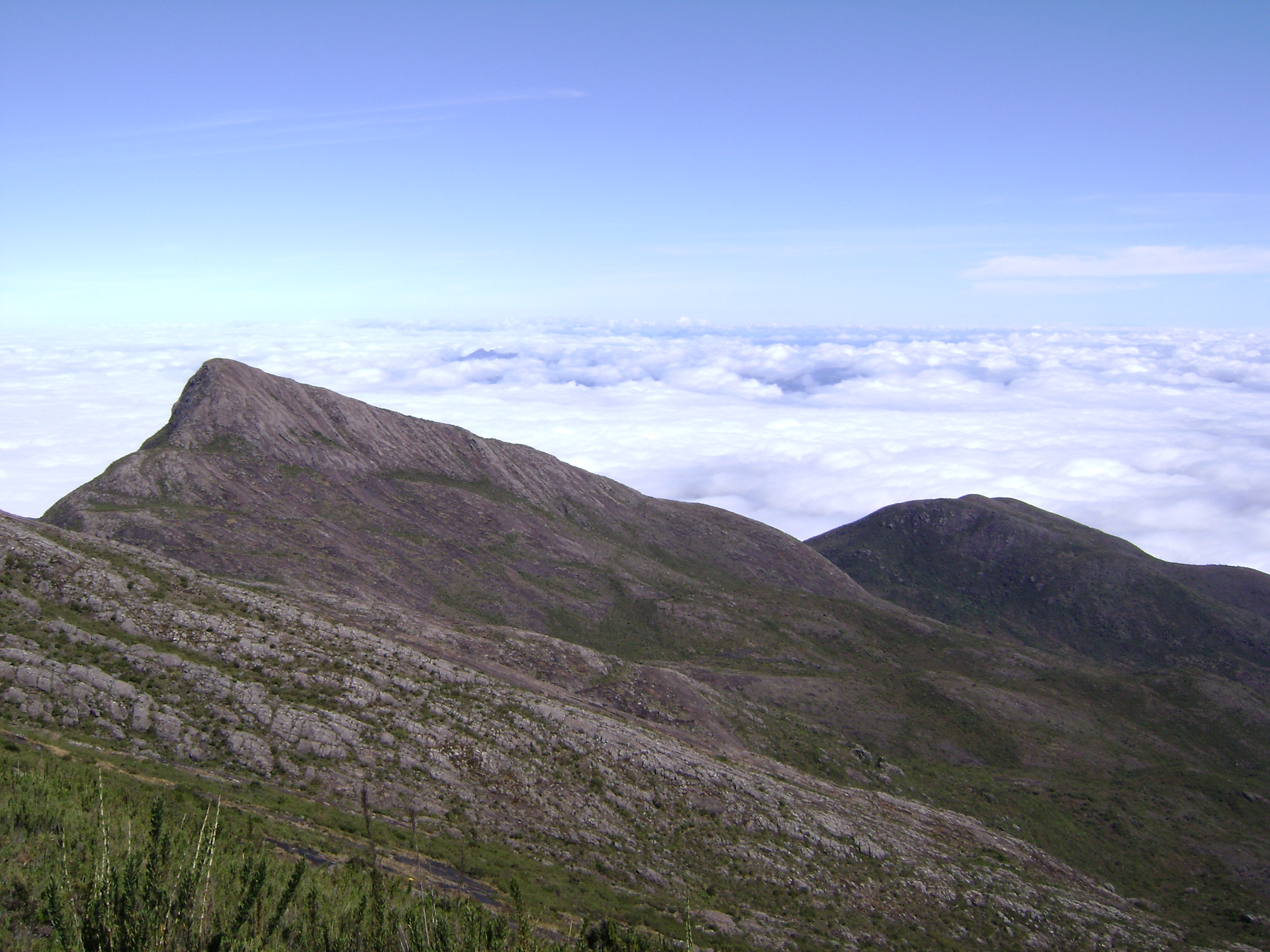
Pico do cristal

== Sources ==
- Lamas, Ivana Reis; Crepaldi, Maria Otávia; Mesquita, Carlos Alberto Bernardo (2015), Uma Rede no Corredor (PDF) (in Portuguese), Conservação Internacional (CI-Brasil), ISBN 978-85-98830-28-5
- Parque Nacional do Caparaó (in Portuguese), ICMBio
- Parque Nacional do Caparaó (in Portuguese), Prefeitura Municipal de Alto Caparaó, archived from the original on 2020-11-28
- Parque Nacional do Caparaó (in Portuguese), SENAC MINAS
