= Morro da Mineira =

Morro da Mineira ("Miner's Hill") is a favela located in the Catumbi neighborhood, near downtown Rio de Janeiro, the Sambadrome, and the Praça da Apoteose. Morro da Mineira is situated on a hill and composed of simple houses inhabited by working class residents. This favela has experienced periods of extreme violence, due primarily to drug trafficking and conflict with the police force. Morro da Mineira's origins date back to the early twentieth century, when underprivileged people began occupying the hills in Rio de Janeiro in an attempt to stay closer to the city center.

== History ==
The name "Morro da Mineira" was selected to honor an illustrious resident named, Maria da Silva Dias César. She possessed a strong personality and moved from Minas Gerais to Rio de Janeiro in the 1950s. Maria was the daughter of Manoel da Silva Dias, a Portuguese man from Ilha da Madeira, and Felizbina de Azevedo Dias. She had eight siblings: Adelina, João Isaque, Daniel (Rio de Janeiro), Pedro (Manhumirim, MG), Azenate, Dorcas (Itaboraí, RJ), and Alzira (Alto Caparaó, MG).

Although called a "Mineira" (person from the state of Minas Gerais), Maria was actually born in Rio de Janeiro, near Cantagalo and Cordeiro around 1910. Her family moved in Minas Gerais when she was very young and resided in the Alto Jequitibá municipality. While living there, Maria met and married Laudelino César, with whom she had six children: Dario, Enéias, Ciro, Leone, Dedier and Aluizio. Maria and her family lived in a very rural region with few resources and life there was difficult. After years of struggle, they moved to Rio de Janeiro in search of a better life.

Life in the favelas of Rio de Janeiro also proved challenging. There was limited access to medical care so, Maria became trained in midwifery. Through her work as a midwife, she became well-known and respected in the local community, who affectionately named her, "Dona Mineira" ("The Lady from Minas Gerais").

Maria died in 1980 and was buried at the São Francisco de Paula cemetery in the Catumbi near her home. She is remembered fondly as a benefactor and, to honor her memory, the community where she lived adopted her nickname.
