= Swian Zanoni =

Brazilian motorcycle racer

- Born: 18 April 1988; Divino, Minas Gerais, Brazil
- Died: 18 September 2011 (aged 23); Orizânia
- Occupation: professional motocross racer

Swian Zanoni (18 April 1988 – 18 September 2011) was a Brazilian professional motocross racer. He was appointed as one of the major talents of the new generation of the sport in Brazil. He was born in Divino, Minas Gerais, Brazil and died in Orizânia.

== Career ==
Zanoni began riding motorcycles at the age of eight. In his career, the Brazilian was twice runner-up for Brazil in the SX2 class and a 20-time champion in motocross and supercross Carioca and a vice Latin American supercross in Costa Rica. With participation in the Motocross World Championship this year, he was recovering after breaking his forearm during the Grand Prix of Latvia.

== Death ==
Zanoni died during a motocross race in Minas Gerais, Orizânia, about 300 km from Belo Horizonte. He was taken to the hospital in the nearby town of Divino, Minas Gerais, but died from his injuries.
