= Sossego Forest Biological Station =

- Reserva Particular do Patrimônio Natural Estação Biológica da Mata do Sossego
- Location within Brazil
- Coordinates: 20°07′25″S 41°59′42″W
- Area: 133.74 ha (330.5 acres)
- Designation: Private natural heritage reserve
- Created: 18 February 1998
- Administrator: Fundação Biodiversitas

The Sossego Forest Biological Station (Portuguese: Reserva Particular do Patrimônio Natural Estação Biológica da Mata do Sossego) is a private natural heritage reserve in the state of Minas Gerais, Brazil. It holds a population of the critically endangered northern muriqui, a primate.

== Location ==
The Sossego Forest Biological Station is in the municipalities of Simonésia and Manhuaçu, Minas Gerais. It has an area of 133.74 hectares (330.5 acres). When the buffer zone is included, the total forest area is 800 hectares (2,000 acres). The Mata do Sossego is 324 kilometres (201 mi) from Belo Horizonte. It holds the largest continuous remnant of Atlantic Forest in the region. The advance of coffee plantations and pastures in the region is further fragmenting the forest and reducing its area.

== History ==
The Sossego Forest Biological Station was created by ordinance 20-N DOU 34 of 18 February 1998, the property of the Fundação Biodiversitas (Biodiversity Foundation). The management plan was approved by the Chico Mendes Institute for Biodiversity Conservation (ICMBio) on 7 January 2015.

== Conservation activities ==
The main purpose is to help preserve the critically endangered northern muriqui (Brachyteles hypoxanthus), the largest primate in the Americas. It is estimated that between 700 and 1,000 Northern muriquis live in the Atlantic Forest remnants in Minas Gerais and Espírito Santo, with confirmed populations in just ten forest fragments in Minas Gerais. Other endangered species include the cougar (Puma concolor) and black-fronted titi (Callicebus nigrifrons). The plants Cariniana legalis and Dicksonia sellowiana are also endangered.

The station is a center for scientific studies in the area, and may become part of an ecological corridor with the Feliciano Miguel Abdala Private Natural Heritage Reserve in Caratinga. The RPPN has infrastructure for visitors and researchers, and has potential for biological, ecological and sociological research. The organizers have undertaken environmental education and organization in the nearby communities, leading to creation of the Association of Friends of Protection of the Simonésia Forests. They have encouraged development of more sustainable agricultural practices. The Biodiversity Foundation has partnered with the Doces Matas Project, along with the managers of the nearby Caparaó National Park and Rio Doce State Park.

== Sources ==
- Aprovado o Plano de Manejo da RPPN Estação Biológica Mata do Sossego, no Município de Simonésia e Manhuaçú/MG (in Portuguese), rppnweb, archived from the original on 2017-03-16
- Drummonde, Glaucia Moreira; Antonini, Yasmine (2006), "A contribuicao da Fundacao Biodiversitas para a implementacao do artigo 7o da Convenscao sobre Diversidade Biologica", Biodiversidade: é para comer, vestir ou para passar no cabelo? : para mudar o mundo! (in Portuguese), Editora Peirópolis, ISBN 978-85-7596-071-4
- Hamú, Denise; Goldstein, Wendy (2004), Communicating Protected Areas, IUCN, ISBN 978-2-8317-0822-5
- RPPN Estação Biológica da Mata do Sossego (in Portuguese), ICMBio
- RPPN Mata do Sossego, MG (in Portuguese), Fundação Biodiversitas
