= Sambadrome Marquês de Sapucaí =

- Sambódromo Marquês de Sapucaí
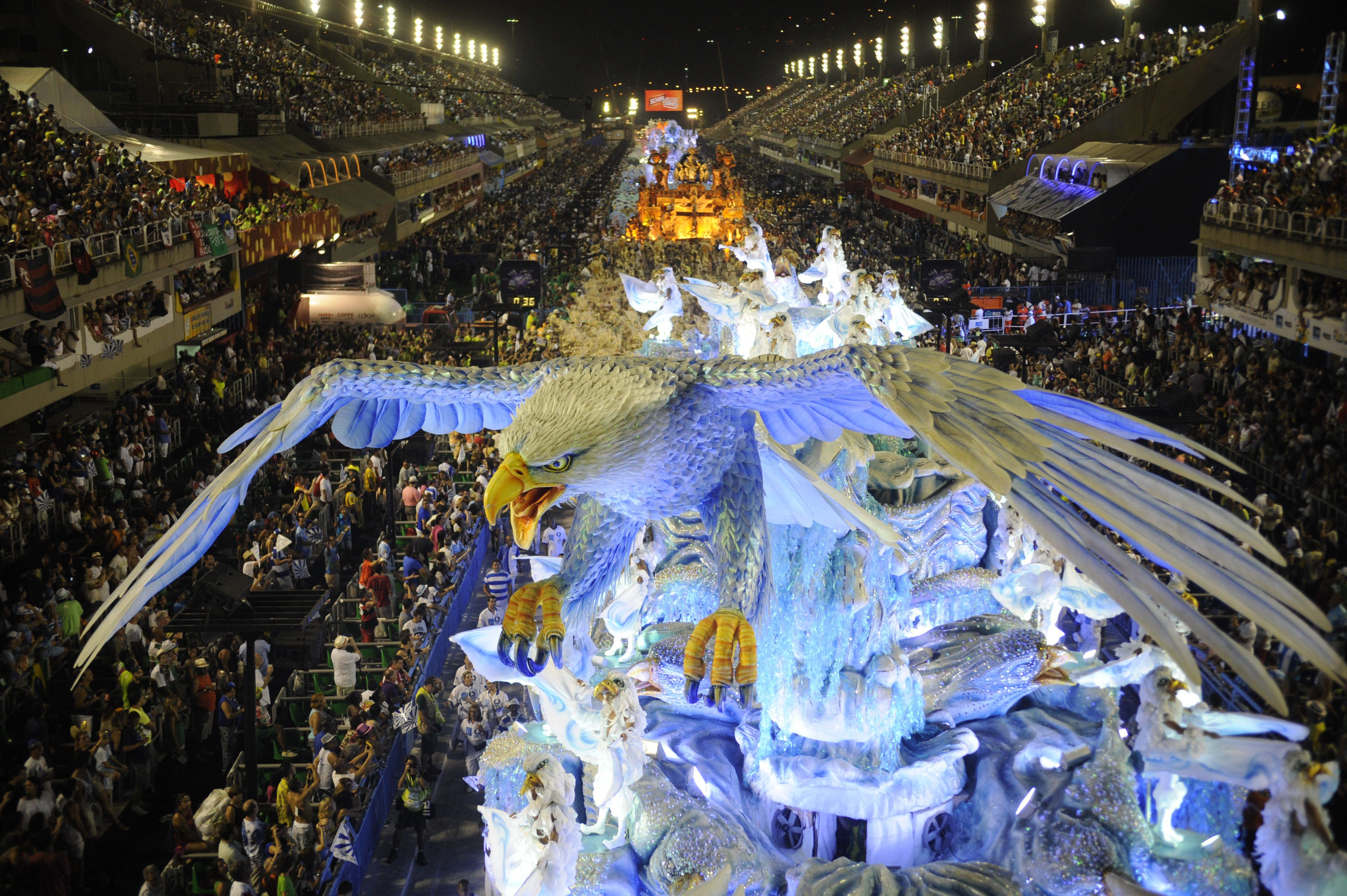
- Long view of parade grounds and seating of the Sambadrome, 2014

- Location within Rio de Janeiro Location within Brazil
- Alternative names: Passarela Professor Darcy Ribeiro; Sambódromo; Sambadrome

General information
- Type: Parade grounds
- Location: R. Marquês de Sapucaí - Santo Cristo, Rio de Janeiro, Brazil
- Coordinates: 22.9112249°S 43.1977481°W
- Named for: Cândido José de Araújo Viana
- Groundbreaking: 1983
- Inaugurated: 1984
- Renovated: 2012
- Owner: State of Rio de Janeiro

Dimensions
- Other dimensions: 570 metres (1,870 ft) in length, 12 metres (39 ft) in width

Design and construction
- Architect: Oscar Niemeyer
- Known for: Cândido José de Araújo Viana, Marquês de Sapucaí

Website
- www.sambadrome.com

The Sambadrome Marquês de Sapucaí is a purpose-built parade area built for the Rio Carnival in Rio de Janeiro, Brazil. The venue is also known as Passarela Professor Darcy Ribeiro or simply the Sambódromo in Portuguese or Sambadrome in English. It is located in the downtown area of Cidade Nova in Rio de Janeiro, and is the place where samba schools parade competitively each year during the Rio Carnival. The parades attract many thousands of Brazilians and foreign tourists each year, and the structure is also used as a multi-purpose performance venue. The structures of the Sambadrome were designed by the architect Oscar Niemeyer (1907–2012), and represent his first major work after the end of the Brazilian dictatorship of 1964–1985.

== History ==
The Sambódromo was commissioned in 1983 and completed in 1984. It is one of two works designed by Oscar Niemeyer upon his return to Brazil after exile during the Brazilian dictatorship of 1964–1985. The democratic election of regional governors, notably in the state of Rio de Janeiro in 1982, signaled a return to civilian rule and renewed work for artists whose work was suppressed by the regime. Governor Leonel Brizola, a longtime Niemeyer associate, commissioned the Sambadrome to reflect socialismo moreno, or multicultural socialism. Niemeyer worked closely with vice-governor Darcy Ribeiro (1922–1997), a Brazilian anthropologist, on the location and building concept. The Sambadrome was not only to function as the centerpiece of the Rio Carnival, but also house a primary school with 115 classrooms underneath the bleachers of the structure. Niemeyers's Praça da Apoteose (Apotheosis Square), a 90 metres (300 ft) trilegged arch, became a noted symbol of the Rio Carnival. The lighting design was made by Peter Gasper, who would go on to collaborate with Niemeyer in other projects.

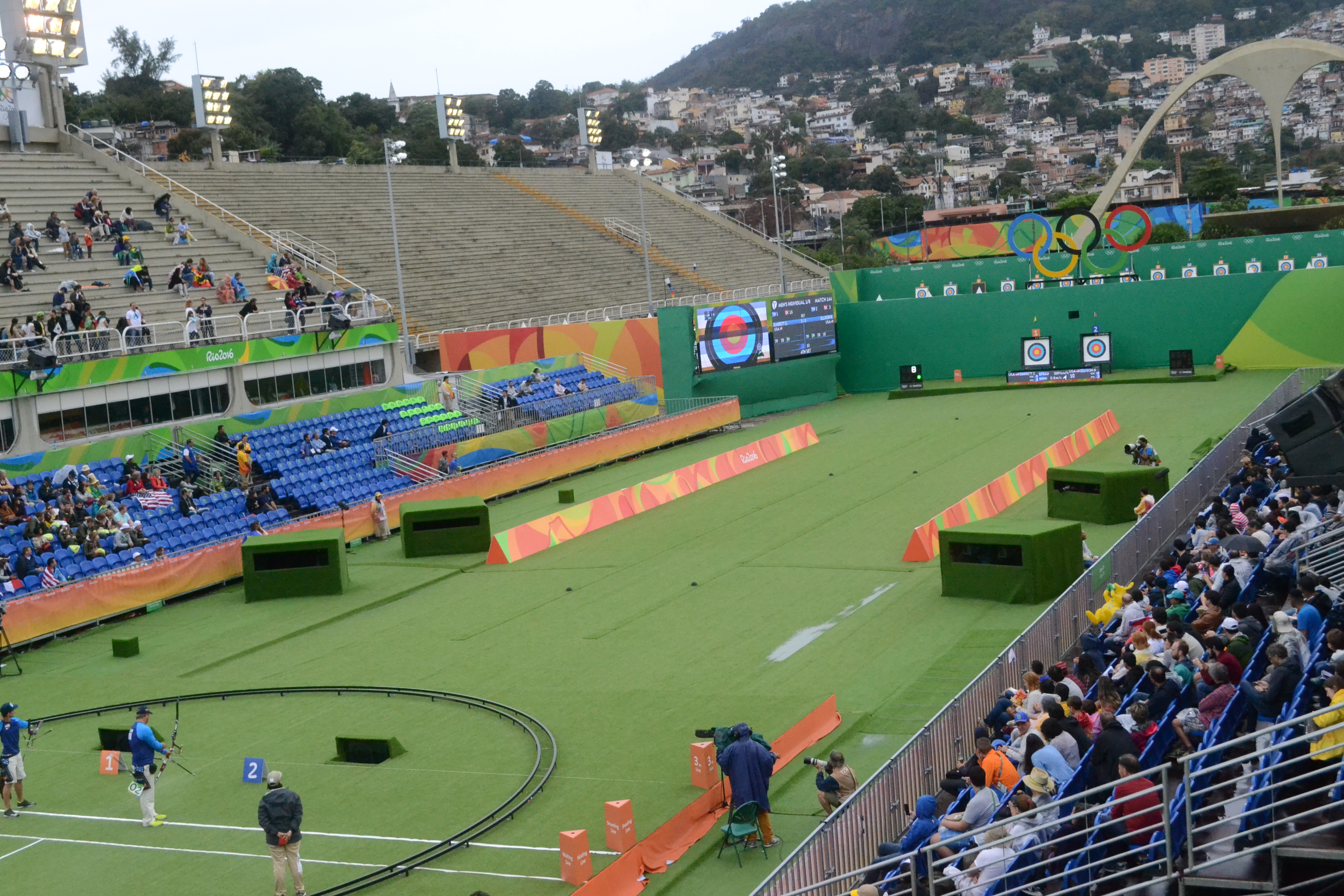
Archery competition at the Sambadrome.

For the 2016 Summer Olympics, the venue hosted archery and the athletics marathon event, and for the 2016 Summer Paralympics, the venue hosted archery.

In preparation for the Olympics, an old Brahma beer factory nearby was demolished and extra bleachers were built on the site, increasing spectator capacity by around 18,000 seats in accordance with Niemeyer's original vision of making the Sambadrome complex symmetrical. The reopening occurred on February 7, 2012. Mayor Eduardo Paes and architect Oscar Niemeyer attended the ceremony. On the remaining part of the old factory behind the new tribunes the high-rise office building Eco Sapucaí was constructed, also designed by Niemeyer. The Sambadromo and the Eco Sapucaí thus form an architectural ensemble.

== Venue ==
The Sambódromo consists of a 700 metres (2,300 ft) stretch of Marquês de Sapucaí street converted into a permanent parade ground with bleachers (grandstands) built on either side for spectators. Its capacity is 90,000. The parade avenue is painted gray each year before Carnival. The complex includes an area located at the end of the parade route, the Praça da Apoteose (Apotheosis Square) near the Morro da Mineira, where the bleachers are set further back from the parade area, creating a square where revelers gather as they end their parade.

Outside the Carnival season, Apotheosis Square is occasionally used as a major concert venue in Rio de Janeiro. Artists who have performed in Apotheosis Square of the Sambadrome include Roger Waters, Eric Clapton, Supertramp, the Black Eyed Peas, Pearl Jam, Elton John, Coldplay, Whitney Houston, Avril Lavigne, Britney Spears, Justin Bieber, Iron Maiden, Radiohead, Hillsong, Jonas Brothers, Nirvana, A-ha, Janet Jackson, Bon Jovi, David Bowie, the Rolling Stones, Marshmello, David Guetta, Hardwell, Martin Garrix, DJ Snake, Alok and many more.

In December, the samba schools begin holding technical rehearsals at the Sambadrome, leading up to Carnival.

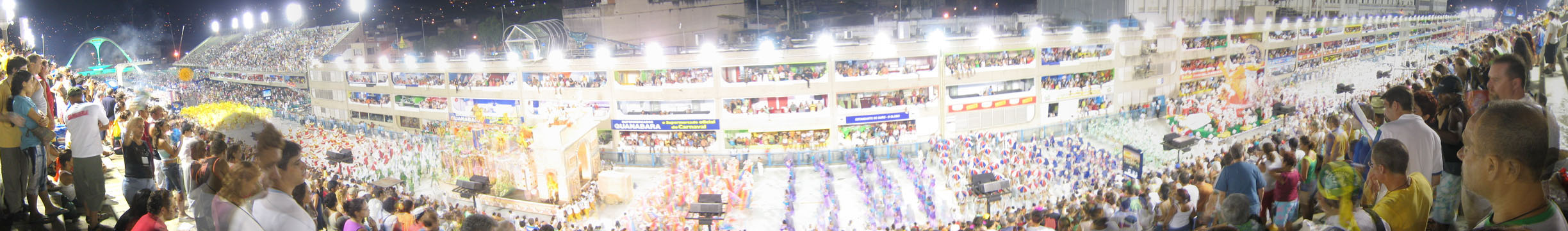
A panoramic shot taken from the top of Sector 9 during the Grupo de Acesso A parade. The school parades from the right to the left, with the arch visible at the end. The VIP camarote seating is visible across the way.

== The Carnival parade events ==
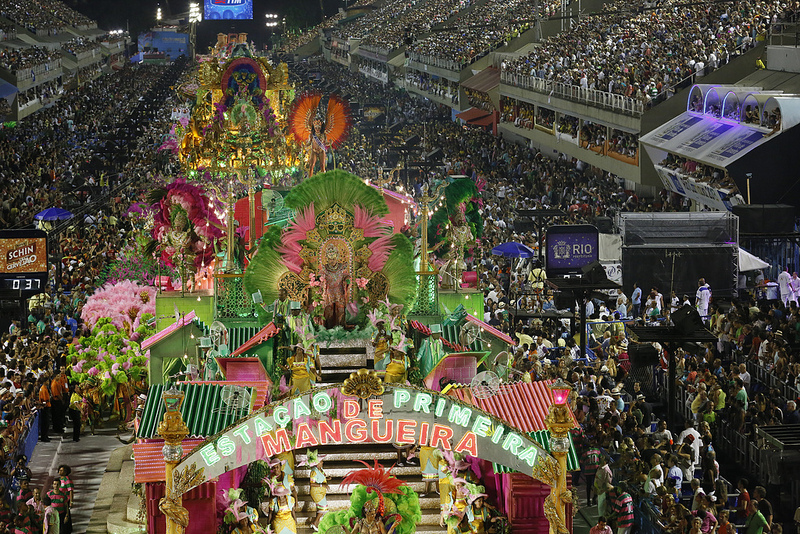
Carnival at Rio

The official Carnival parades take place just before the start of Lent. They are held for four consecutive nights, during which schools parade one after another from 8pm until the morning. The A Series samba schools are hosted on Friday and Saturday, and the elite Special Group marches on Sunday and Monday. The Special Group nights are by far the biggest attractions. The parades are televised nationally and are watched by large audiences.

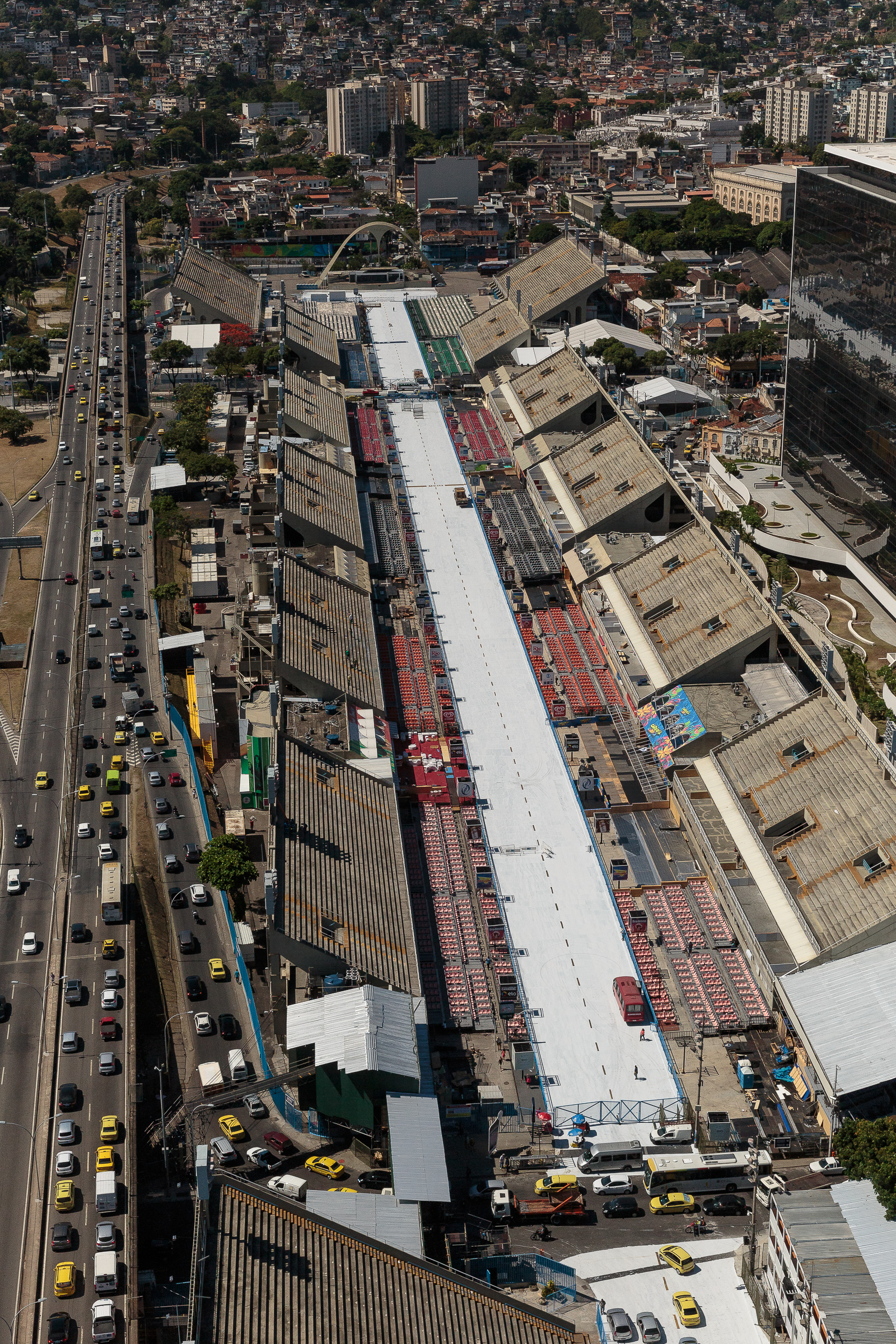
Aerial photo

Each samba school has a preset amount of time (75 minutes) to parade from one end of the Sambadrome to the other with all its thousands of dancers, its drum section, and a number of floats. Each school has its own unique qualities according to its own traditions. Schools are graded by a jury, and the competition is ferocious. On Ash Wednesday (quarta-feira de cinzas), grades are gathered and one school is declared the winner. The Parade of Champions is held the following Saturday featuring the five winning samba schools in the Special Group category and the A Series division winner, which joins the Special Group come the next year.

In 2008, ticket prices for normal bleacher, or Grandstands, seats in the Sambadrome on Special Group nights ranged between R$10 and R$500 (US$6.50 to US$312.50), with VIP Cabins, or Covered Boxes, seating (which includes open bar, buffet - dinner, dessert and more) and scalped tickets costing much more (starting from US$2,500.00, in the best locations).

Inflated prices to watch star samba schools exclude many Brazilians from attending. As a reaction to high levels of commercialization, Rio de Janeiro has experienced a resurgence in free block parties (Street Bands and Groups: Blocos) that take place in suburbs all over the city.

It is possible for a person who is not a member of any samba school to buy a costume and arrange for a spot as a dancer in one of the parade groups.

== See also ==
- LIESA
- LIERJ
- Anhembi Sambadrome
- List of Oscar Niemeyer works

== In popular culture ==
=== Cinema ===
- Parts of Paulo Fontenelle's film Apaixonados (2016) were shot at the Marquês de Sapucaí sambodrome.
- Parts of the film Orfeu (1999), by Cacá Diegues, were shot at the Marquês de Sapucaí sambodrome.

=== Literature ===
- Three excerpts from the novel "The Big Day," by Pierre Cormon (2024), are set at the Marquês de Sapucaí sambadrome.
