= Simonésia =

- Municipality
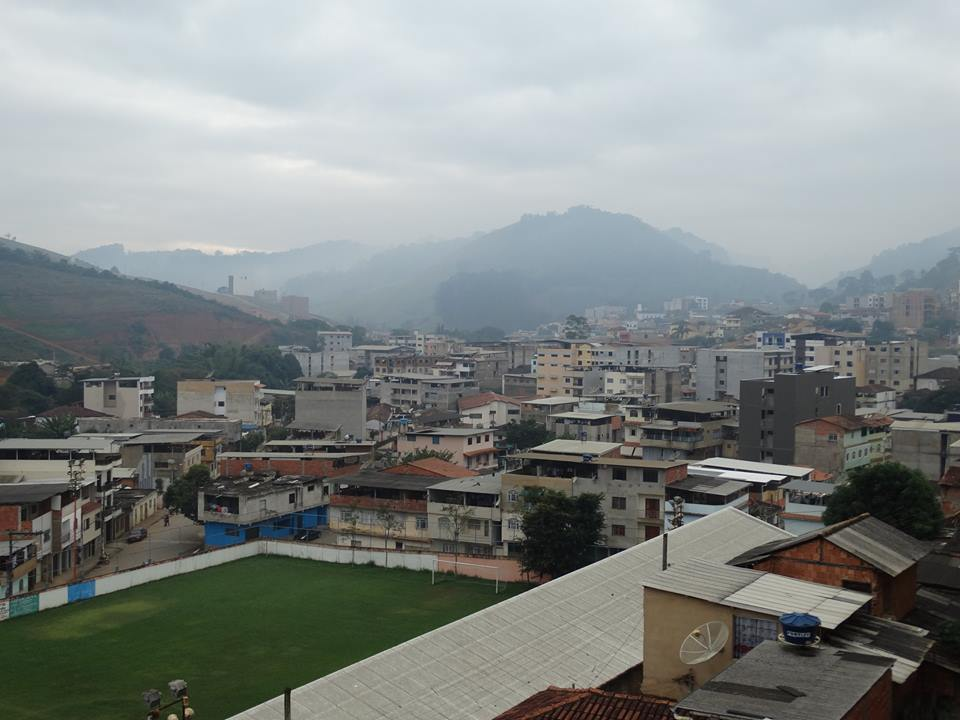

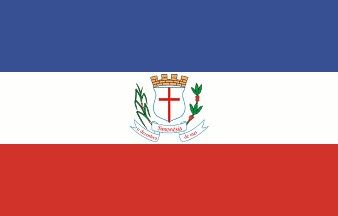
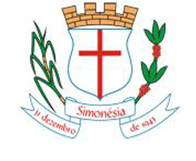
- Flag Coat of arms
- Motto: “Quem conhece se encanta!”
- Interactive map of Simonésia
- Country: Brazil
- Region: Southeast
- State: Minas Gerais
- Founded / Established: 31 December 1943

Area
  - Total: 487.85 km^{2} (188.36 sq mi)
- Elevation: 598 m (1,962 ft)

Population (2010)
  - Total: 18,302
- Time zone: BRT (UTC-3)

Simonésia is a municipality in the state of Minas Gerais, Brazil. It lies in the mesoregion of Zona da Mata and the microregion of Manhuaçu. The municipality was officially created on 31 December 1943.

== Geography and demographics ==
Simonésia is located in the Zona da Mata region of eastern Minas Gerais. It covers an area of approximately 487.85 km² and sits at altitudes ranging from about 598 m (e.g., Cachoeira da Neblina) up to around 1,647 m at its mountainous headwaters.

According to estimates, the population was about 19,736 in 2020.

Residents are known as simonesienses.

== History ==
The region’s initial settlement around a river valley, later called São Simão, is dated to around 1855 when explorers arrived. The district was elevated and subsequently the municipality of Simonésia was created by Decree-Law 1.058 of 31 December 1943, having been desegregated from the municipality of Manhuaçu.

== Economy and environment ==
The economy of Simonésia is based significantly on agriculture, especially coffee cultivation, with complementary activities in livestock and services.

The municipality holds part of the private natural heritage reserve (RPPN) known as the Sossego Forest Biological Station (Estação Biológica Mata do Sossego), which protects Atlantic Forest remnants, mountainous terrain and rich biodiversity.

== Tourism and culture ==
Simonésia offers natural attractions including waterfalls (such as the Cachoeira do Marreco) and forested hillsides, and hosts cultural events like its Carnival and the “Simonésia Fest”.
