= Praça da Apoteose =

Multi-use venue in Rio de Janeiro, Brazil

Apotheosis Square
- Praça da Apoteose
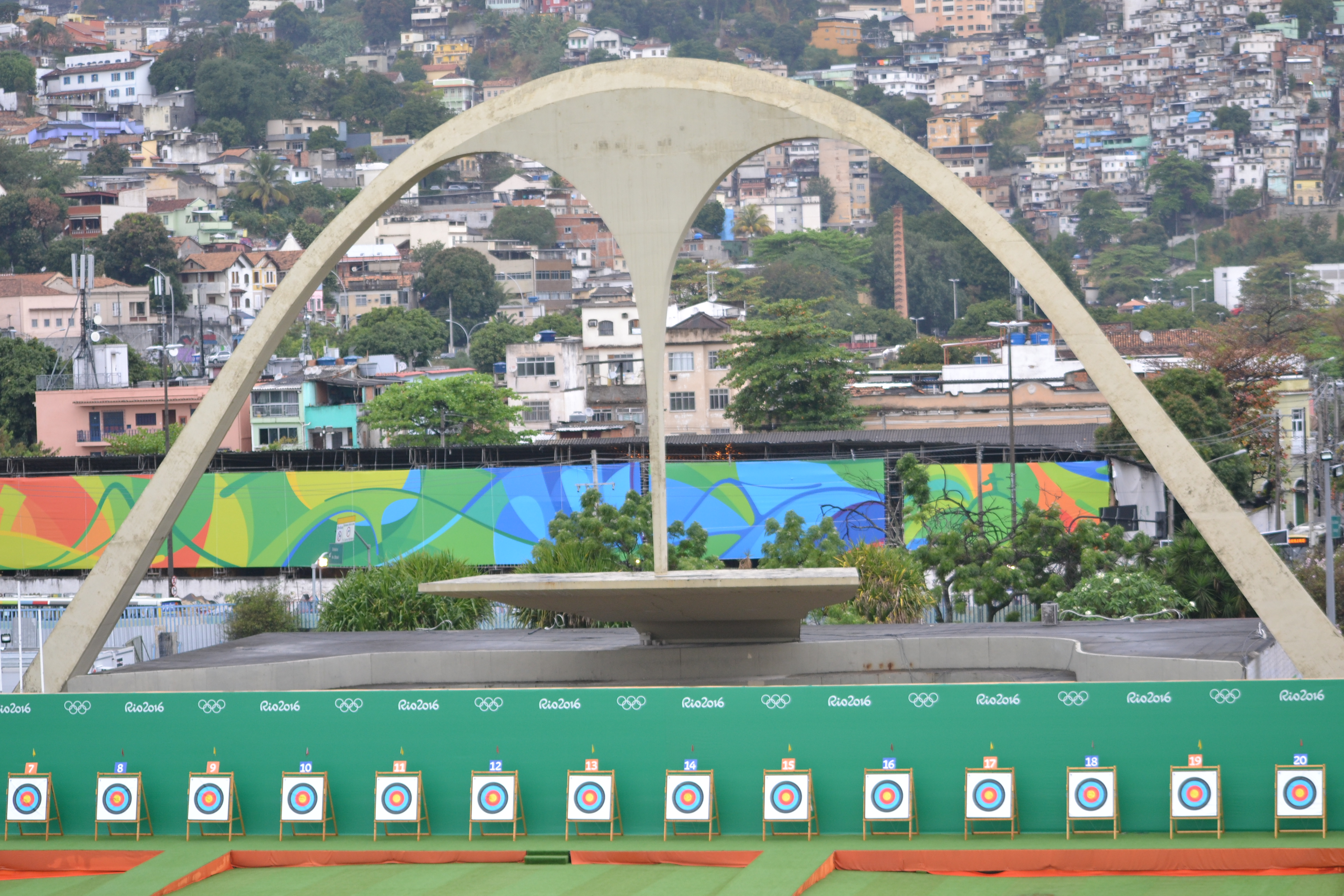
- Arch at the Apotheosis Square

- Location within Brazil
- Address: R. Marquês de Sapucaí, 36
- Location: Santo Cristo, Rio de Janeiro, Brazil
- Coordinates: 22°54′46.43″S 43°11′46.9″W
- Type: Public square

Construction
- Opened: 1987
- Architect: Oscar Niemeyer

The Apotheosis Square (Praça da Apoteose) is a venue in Rio de Janeiro close to the Morro da Mineira favela. It is part of Sambadrome Marquês de Sapucaí, which can hold a maximum 90,000 people. For concerts, it can hold from 10,000 to 40,000 people.

It was designed by well-known architect Oscar Niemeyer in 1983.

In 1989, the band A-ha played two concerts with an attendance of 80.000 people each.

On July 7, 2007 (07/07/07) the band Diante do Trono recorded their 10th album, called Príncipe da Paz (Prince of Peace). In the event, more than 100,000 people were gathered, packing the venue.

On March 14, 2010, a stage collapsed before a Guns N' Roses concert due to heavy rain and a small tornado. The concert was rescheduled to April 4.

== Concerts ==
Since the 1970s, it has hosted artists' and band's presentations and concerts. It also hosted the Hollywood Rock festivals and some other events. In this chart there are some memorable concerts held at this square:

Year	Artist	Tour	Date	Attendance
1989	A-ha	Stay on These Roads Tour	March 10 and 11	
1989	Rod Stewart	Out of Order Tour	March 31	
1990	Bob Dylan	Never Ending Tour 1990	January 25	
1990	Bon Jovi	New Jersey Syndicate Tour	January 27	
1990	David Bowie	Sound+Vision Tour	September 20	
1990	Eric Clapton	Journeyman World Tour	October 7	
1992	Roxette	Join the Joyride! Tour	May 9	
1993	Red Hot Chili Peppers	Blood Sugar Sex Magik Tour	January 22	
1993	Nirvana	Hollywood Rock Festival	January 23	
1993	Johnny Gill	Provocative Tour 1993	February 17	
1994	Aerosmith	Get a Grip Tour	January 21	
1994	Whitney Houston	The Bodyguard World Tour	January 23	
1995	Bon Jovi	These Days Tour	October 26	
1998	Rolling Stones	Bridges to Babylon Tour	April 11	27,984 / 27,984
2001	Eric Clapton	Reptile World Tour	October 13	
2005	Avril Lavigne	Bonez Tour	September 24	
2006	Santana	2006 Tour	March 18	11,857 / 40,000
2006	Robbie Williams	Close Encounters Tour	October 14	
2007	Roger Waters	Dark Side of the Moon Live	March 23	34,833 / 38,040
2008	Scorpions	Humanity World Tour	August 28	
2009	Elton John	Rocket Man: Greatest Hits Live	January 19	
2009	Iron Maiden	Somewhere Back in Time World Tour	March 14	15,806 / 20,000
2009	Kiss	kiss Alive/35 World Tour	April 8	9,517 / 38,000
2009	Jonas Brothers	Jonas Brothers World Tour 2009	May 23	15,006 / 20,040
2010	Coldplay	Viva la Vida Tour	February 28	26,821 / 34,960
2010	Guns N' Roses	Chinese Democracy Tour	April 4	20,609 / 35,000
2010	Bon Jovi	The Circle Tour	October 8	10,308 / 32,400
2010	Rush	Time Machine Tour	October 10	15,529 / 15,529
2010	The Black Eyed Peas	The E.N.D World Tour	October 24	20,632 / 20,632
2011	Pearl Jam	Pearl Jam Twenty Tour	November 6	34,068 / 35,000
2011	Britney Spears	Femme Fatale Tour	November 15	13,048 / 35,000
2013	Black Sabbath	Reunion Tour	October 13	29,899 / 33,108
2013	Aerosmith	Global Warming Tour	October 18	
2013	Justin Bieber	Believe Tour	November 3	22,598 / 33,199
2014	Miley Cyrus	Bangerz Tour	September 28	10,712 / 31,543
2016	Maroon 5	Maroon V Tour	March 20	34,980 / 34,980
2016	Black Sabbath	The End Tour	December 2	26,764 / 35,000
2017	Justin Bieber	Purpose World Tour	March 29	30,801 / 30,801
2017	Elton John	Wonderful Crazy Night Tour	April 1	14,253 / 35,560
2017	Bruno Mars	24K Magic World Tour	November 18 and 19	56,846 / 56,846
2018	Katy Perry	Witness: The Tour	March 18	11,888 / 13,509

== See also ==
- List of Oscar Niemeyer works
