= Catumbi =

Neighborhood in Rio de Janeiro, Brazil

- Neighborhood
- Location in Rio de Janeiro Catumbi (Brazil)
- Coordinates: 22°55′05″S 43°11′49″W
- Country: Brazil
- State: Rio de Janeiro (RJ)
- Municipality/City: Rio de Janeiro
- Zone: Centro

Population (2010)
  - Total: 12,556

Catumbi is a neighborhood in Rio de Janeiro, Brazil, and includes the Morro da Mineira favela.
