= Manhuaçu Airport =

Elias Breder Airport Aeroporto Elias Breder
- IATA: JMA; ICAO: SNJM; LID: MG0050

Summary
- Airport type: Public
- Serves: Manhuaçu
- Time zone: BRT (UTC−03:00)
- Elevation AMSL: 829 m (2,720 ft)
- Coordinates: 20°15′35″S 042°11′02″W

Map
- Location in Brazil JMA (Brazil)

Runways
Direction	Length		Surface
Direction	m	ft	Surface
02/20	1,170	3,839	Asphalt
- Sources: ANAC, DECEA

Elias Breder Airport (IATA: JMA, ICAO: SNJM) is the airport serving Manhuaçu, Brazil.

== Airlines and destinations ==
Airlines	Destinations
Azul Conecta	Belo Horizonte–Confins

== Access ==
The airport is located 22 km (14 mi) from downtown Manhuaçu.

== See also ==
- List of airports in Brazil
