= Reduto =

- Municipality
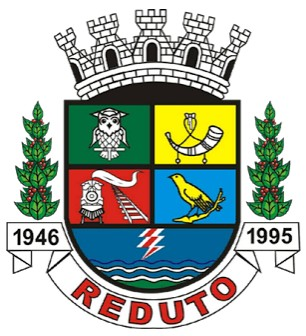
- Coat of arms
- Interactive map of Reduto
- Country: Brazil
- Region: Southeast
- State: Minas Gerais
- Founded / Incorporated: 21 December 1995 (installed 1 January 1997)

Area
  - Total: 151.86 km^{2} (58.63 sq mi)
- Elevation: 600 m (2,000 ft)

Population (2022)
  - Total: 7,848
- Time zone: BRT

Reduto is a municipality in the Brazilian state of Minas Gerais. It lies in the Zona da Mata region and belongs to the immediate geographic region of Manhuaçu and the intermediate region of Juiz de Fora. The municipality became independent on 21 December 1995 and was officially installed on 1 January 1997.

== Geography and demographics ==
Reduto covers an area of about 151.86 km². The town is located at an average altitude of roughly 600 metres above sea level, with higher elevations reaching about 1,140 metres in the surrounding hills. According to the 2022 census, the municipality had a population of 7,848 inhabitants, resulting in a population density of approximately 52 inhabitants per km².

The climate is mild and humid, typical of the Zona da Mata region, with well-defined wet and dry seasons. The local vegetation is composed mainly of remnants of Atlantic Forest and pasturelands.

== History ==
The area began as a rural district called Estação, later renamed Reduto, under the jurisdiction of the municipality of Manhuaçu. It became a district by Law No. 336 on 27 December 1948 and was elevated to municipality status by State Law No. 12.030 on 21 December 1995. The municipal government was officially installed on 1 January 1997.

== Economy and infrastructure ==
Agriculture is the backbone of Reduto’s economy. The municipality is part of one of Brazil’s main coffee-producing belts, with small and medium farms dedicated to arabica coffee cultivation. Cattle ranching, dairy farming and small-scale industries also contribute to local income.

According to the Brazilian Institute of Geography and Statistics, Reduto’s gross domestic product (GDP) was estimated at R$106.5 million in 2021, with a per-capita GDP around R$16,700. The Human Development Index (HDI) in 2010 was 0.629, classified as medium.

== Culture and administration ==
The municipality is governed by a mayor and a city council. The population maintains strong cultural roots connected to rural traditions, coffee harvest festivals and religious celebrations. The town’s modest size gives it a predominantly agrarian character, with a growing service sector linked to commerce and education.
