= Dores do Rio Preto =

- Municipality
- The Municipality of Dores do Rio Preto
- Flag Coat of arms

- Location of Dores do Rio Preto in the State of Espírito Santo
- Coordinates: 20°41′20″S 41°50′42″W
- Country: Brazil
- Region: Southeast
- State: Espírito Santo
- Founded: April 7, 1964

Government
  - Mayor: Cláudia Martins Bastos (PSDB)

Area
  - Total: 153.106 km^{2} (59.115 sq mi)
- Elevation: 55 m (180 ft)

Population (2020)
  - Total: 6,771
  - Density: 44.9/km^{2} (116/sq mi)
- Time zone: UTC-3 (BRT)
- HDI (2000): 0.674 – medium

Dores do Rio Preto is the westernmost municipality in the Brazilian state of Espírito Santo. Its population was 6,771 (2020) and its area is 153.106 km^{2}. The village Pedras Meninas in Dores is the location for the entrance to Caparaó National Park and the Pico da Bandeira from Espirito Santo.
