= Dom Cavati =

- Municipality
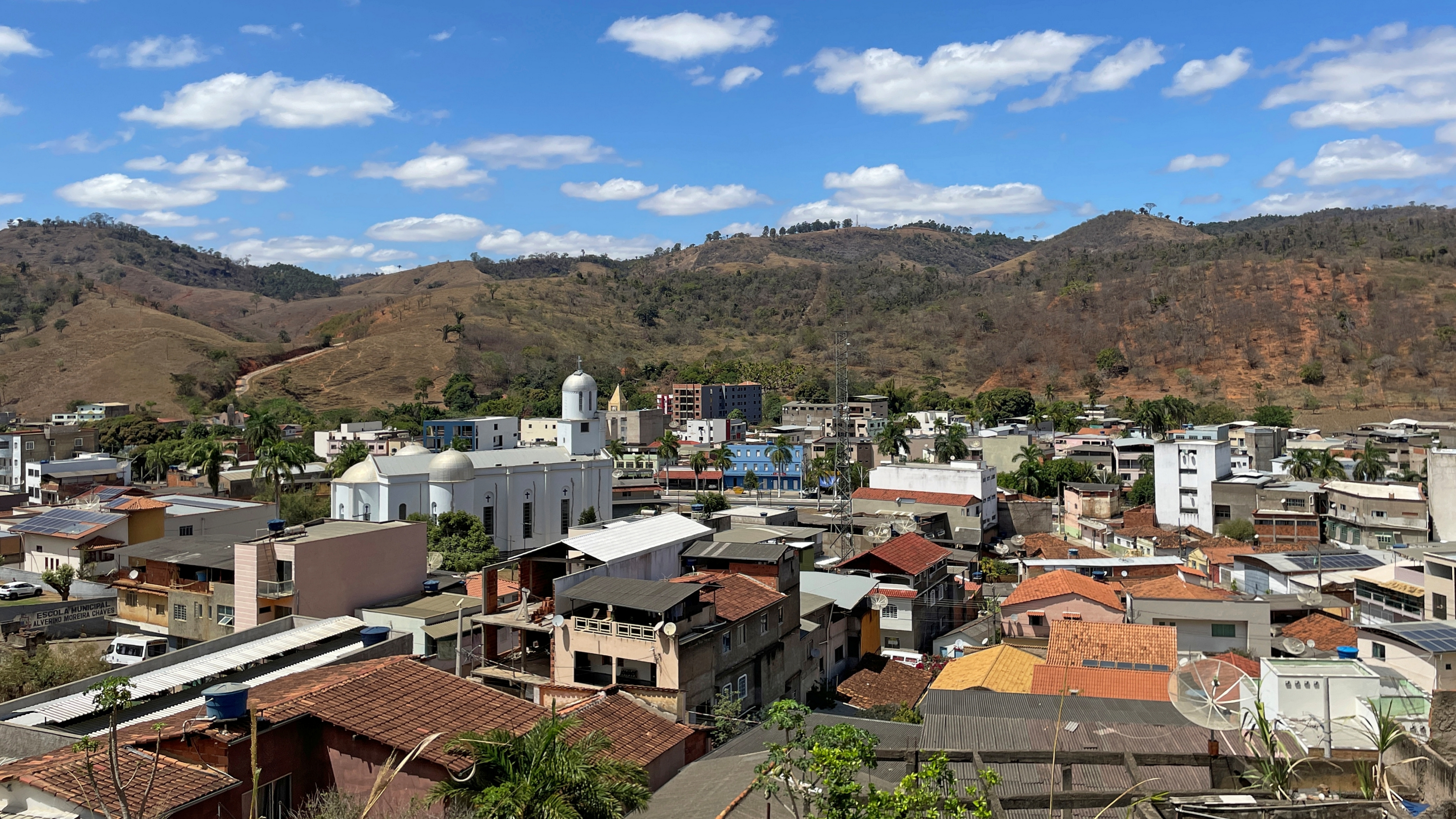
- Partial view of Dom Cavati

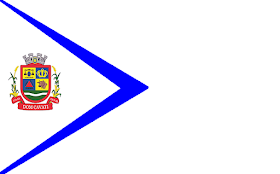
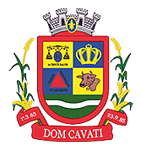
- Flag Coat of arms

- Location within Brazil Minas Gerais Location within Brazil
- Coordinates: 19°22′34″S 42°06′28″W
- Country: Brazil
- Region: Southeast
- State: Minas Gerais
- Mesoregion: Vale do Rio Doce

Population (2022 Census)
  - Total: 4,904
  - Estimate (2025): 4,967
- Time zone: UTC−3 (BRT)

Dom Cavati is a municipality in the state of Minas Gerais in the Southeast region of Brazil.

== See also ==
- List of municipalities in Minas Gerais
