= Pedra Bonita =

Brazilian municipality located in the state of Minas Gerais

Coordinates: 20°31′15″S 42°19′48″W

- Municipality
- Interactive map of Pedra Bonita
- Country: Brazil
- State: Minas Gerais
- Region: Southeast
- Time zone: UTC−3 (BRT)

Location of Pedra Bonita within Minas Gerais

Pedra Bonita is a Brazilian municipality located in the state of Minas Gerais. The city belongs to the mesoregion of Zona da Mata and to the microregion of Manhuaçu. As of 2020, the estimated population was 7,128.

== See also ==
- List of municipalities in Minas Gerais
