= Malhada =

Municipality of Bahia, Brazil

Coordinates: 14°20′09″S 43°46′26″W

- Municipality
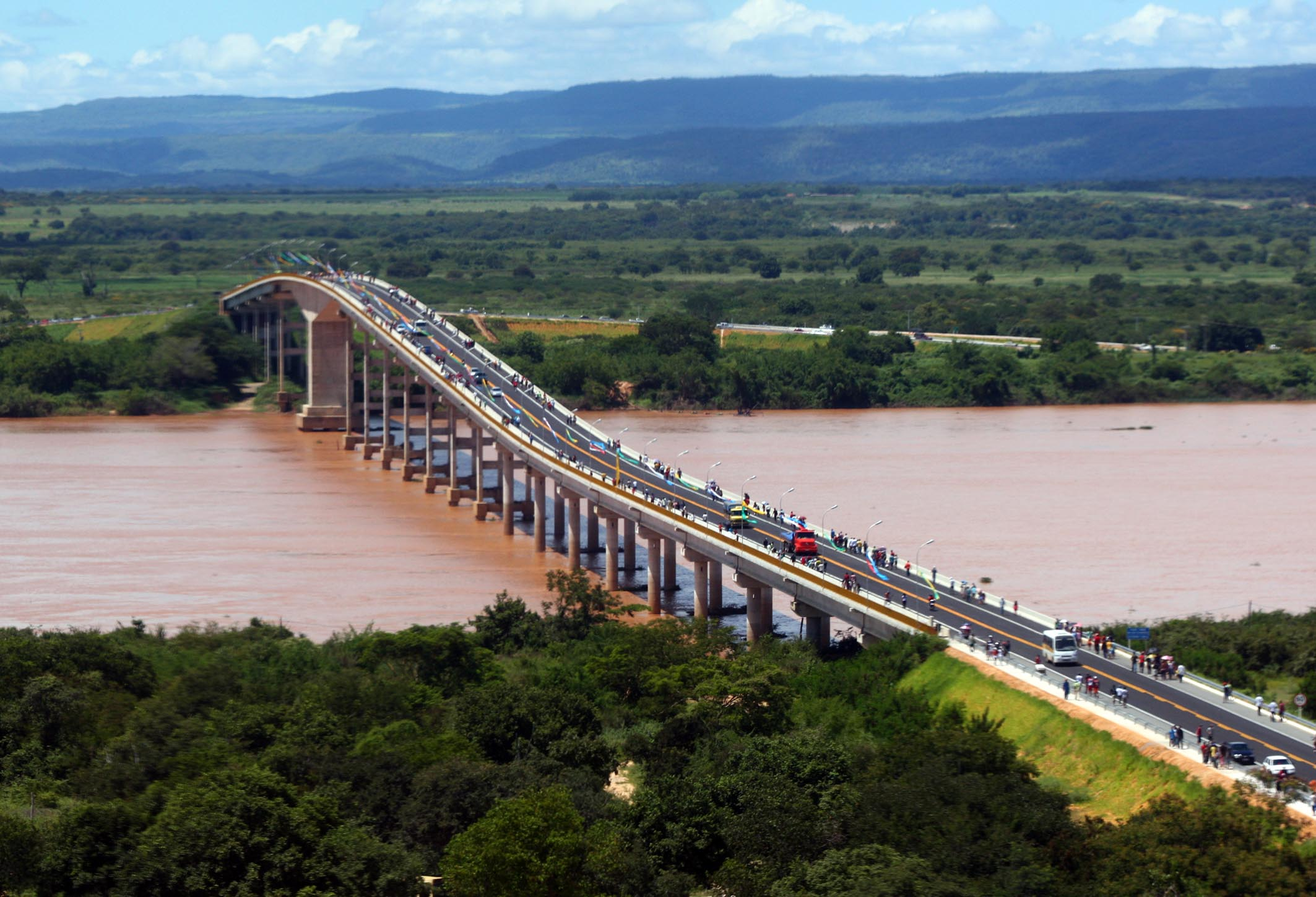

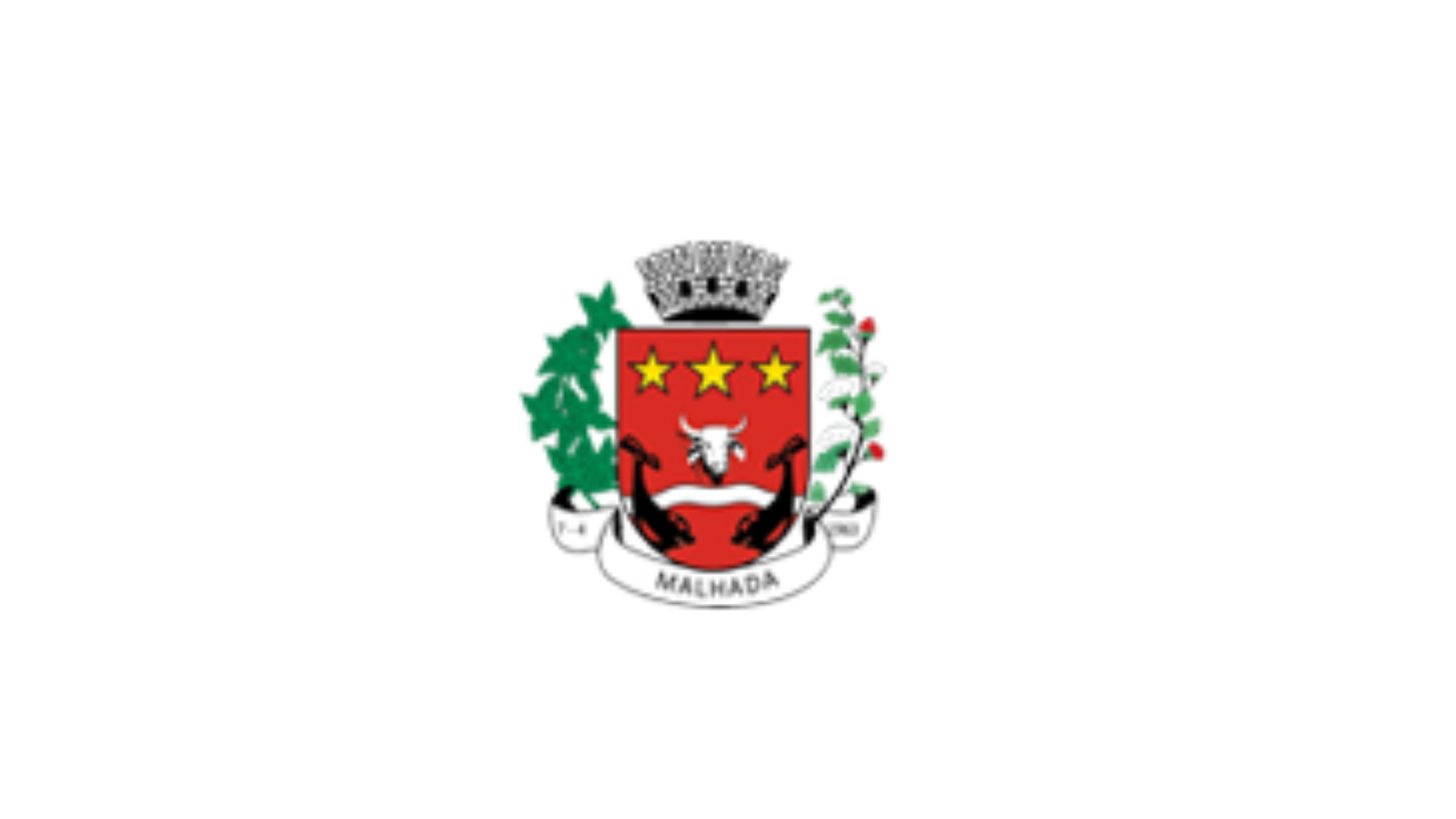
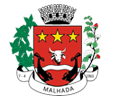
- Flag Coat of arms
- Interactive map of Malhada
- Country: Brazil
- Region: Nordeste
- State: Bahia

Population (2020)
  - Total: 16,861
- Time zone: UTC−3 (BRT)

Malhada is a municipality in the state of Bahia in the North-East region of Brazil.

== See also ==
- List of municipalities in Bahia
