= Cândido José de Araújo Viana, Marquis of Sapucaí =

Brazilian writer and noble (1793–1875)

Marquis of Sapucaí
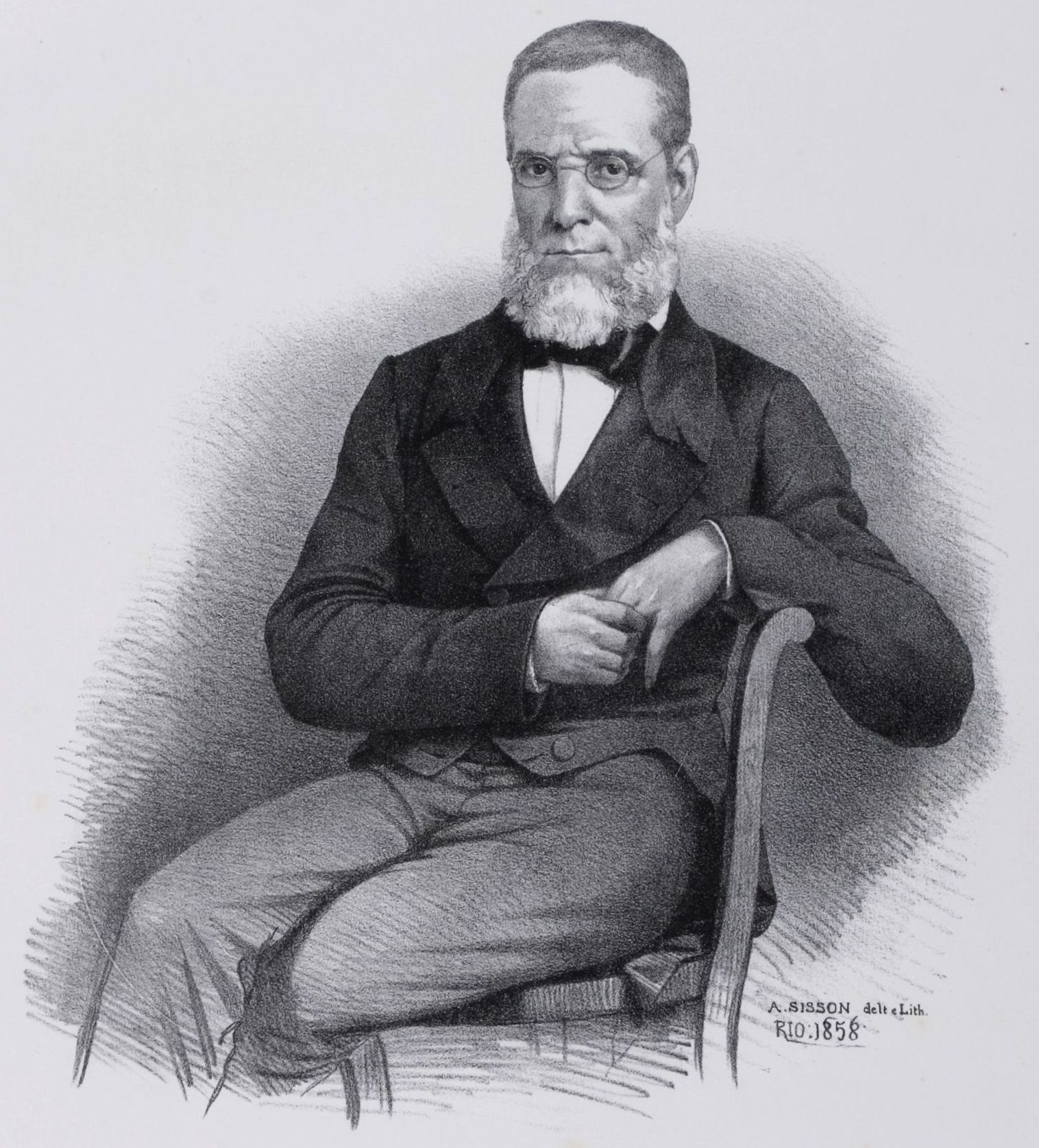

Minister of Justice
- In office 14 May 1833 – 4 June 1833
- Monarch: Pedro II
- Preceded by: Honório Carneiro Leão
- Succeeded by: Aureliano Coutinho

Personal details
- Born: 15 September 1793 Nova Lima, Minas Gerais, Colonial Brazil
- Died: 23 January 1875 (aged 81) Rio de Janeiro, Empire of Brazil
- Spouse: Ana Efigênia Vieira de Ramalho
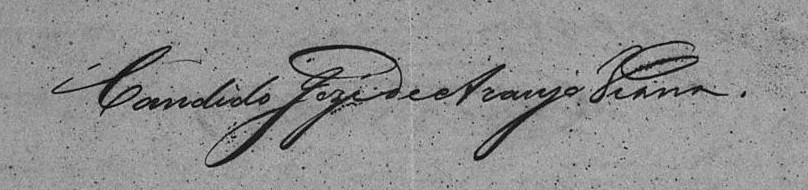
- Signature

Cândido José de Araújo Viana, Marquis of Sapucaí (Note: original spelling ‘Candido Joze de Araujo Vianna, Marquês de Sapucahy’) (Nova Lima, (Note: then known as ‘Congonhas de Sabará’) 15 September 1793 — Rio de Janeiro, 23 January 1875) was a Brazilian politician and judge.

== Public life ==
He was at various times Minister of Finance, Minister of Justice, Councillor of State, deputy, Provincial President and a Senator from 1840 to 1875, elected from Minas Gerais. He was President of the Senate 1851–1853.

He went to school in his native country, then went to the University of Coimbra in 1815. After graduating in law in 1821, he became a member of the Constituent Assembly in 1823 and then of the Chamber of Deputies representing Minas Gerais for three terms. He was appointed President of first Alagoas (1826) and then Maranhão provinces (1828). He was Crown Prosecutor, minister of the Supreme Court of Justice (1849), Finance Minister and an exceptional member of the Council of State from the time of its creation. As Minister of Imperial Affairs in the second conservative cabinet (1841-1843), he steered through the law which accorded senators the title “Your Excellency.”

== Other roles ==
In 1839 he was appointed tutor in Literature and Positive Sciences to Crown Prince Pedro; later he was also placed in charge of the education of the Princess Imperial.

He was also vice-president of the Society for the Support of National Industry and Honorary Grand Master of the Grande Oriente do Brasil. He served on the founding board of the Brazilian Historic and Geographic Institute and was its president from 1847 to 1875.

== Honours ==
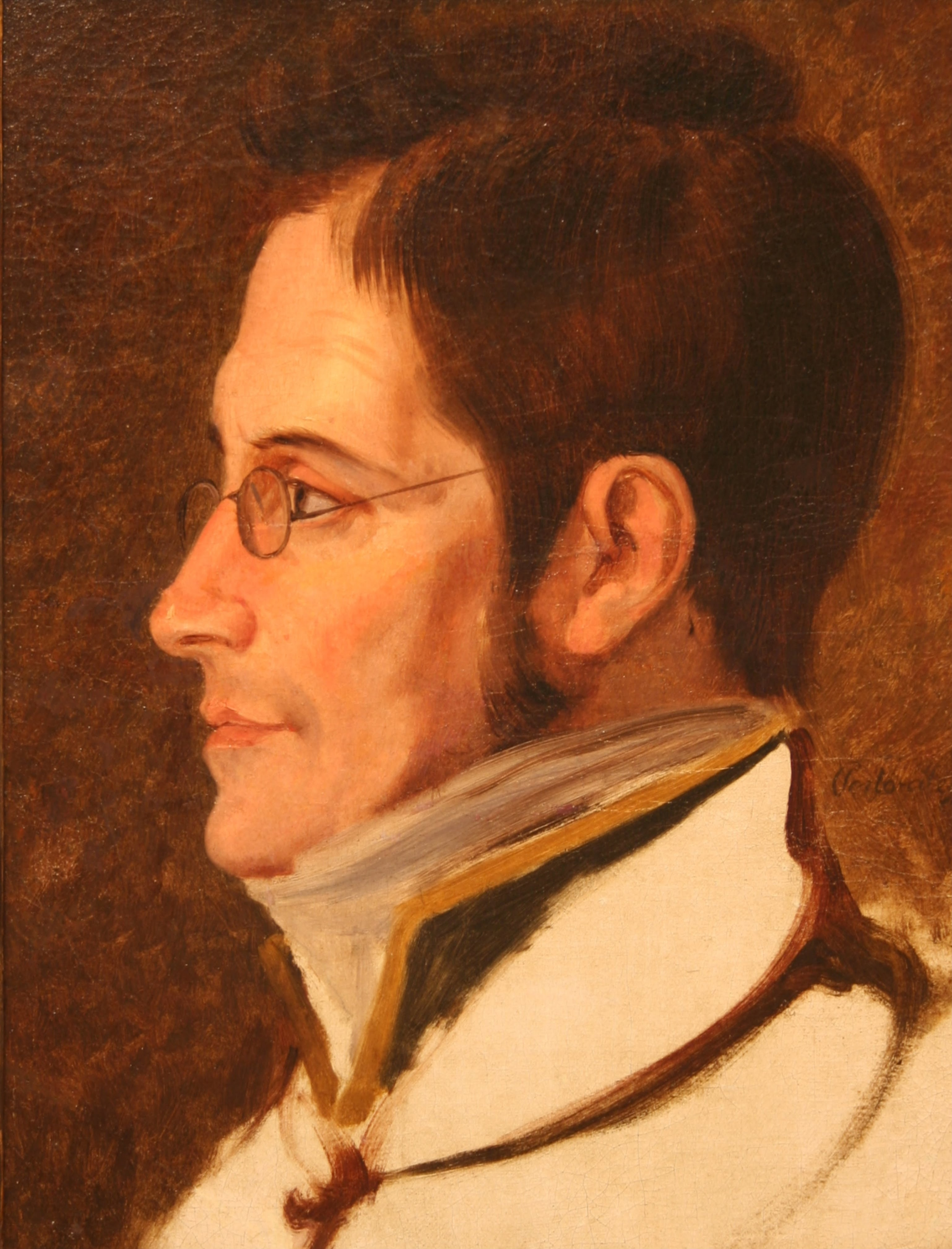
Portrait by Porto Alegre, 1842

He was decorated with the Order of Christ and the Order of the Rose, as well as the Grand Cross of the Order of the Tower and Sword and the Legion of Honour. He was made viscount in 1854 and marquess in 1872. He was a privy councillor, gentleman of the bedchamber and knight of the Imperial Household.
