= Belo Oriente =

- Municipality
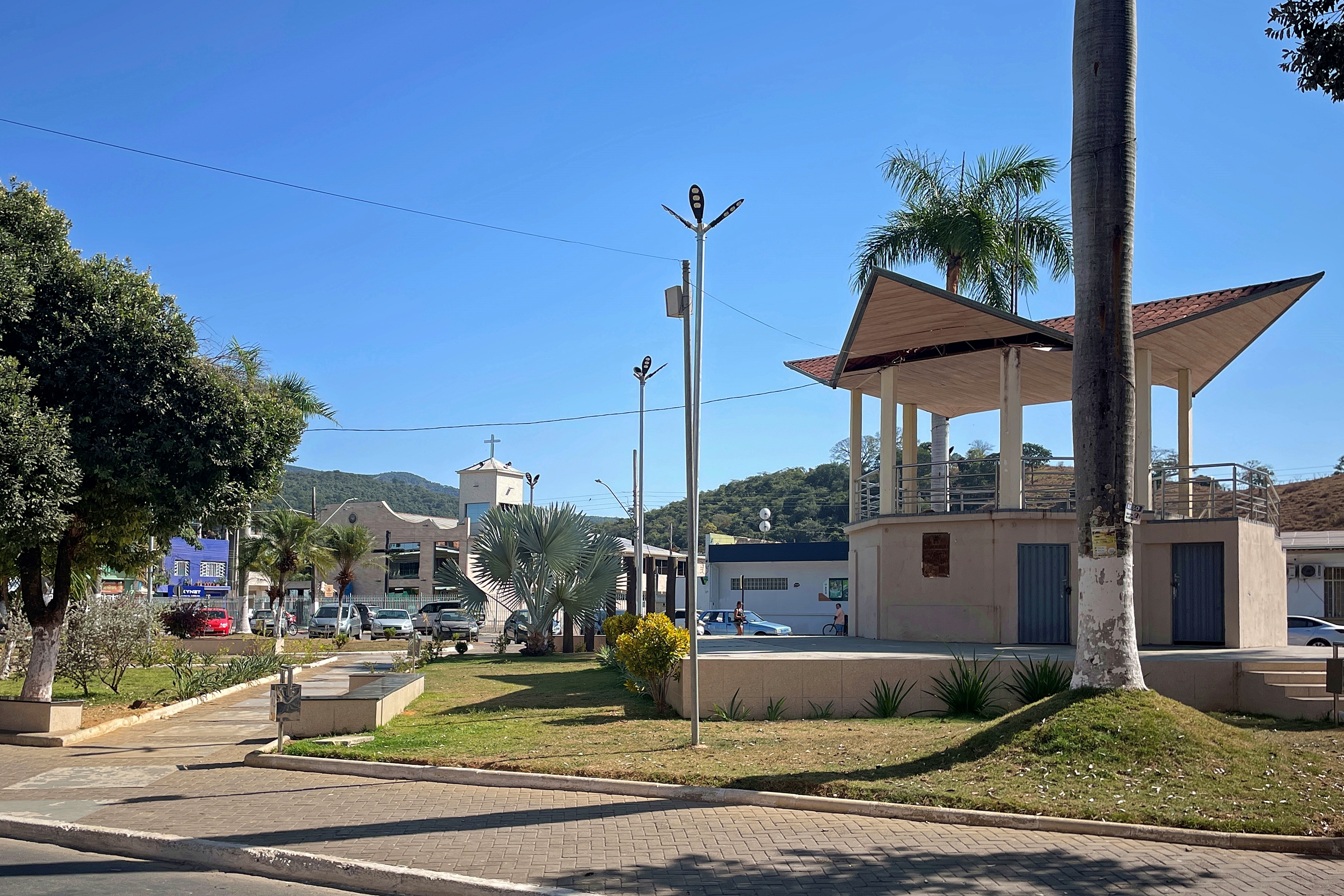
- Nossa Senhora da Piedade Square

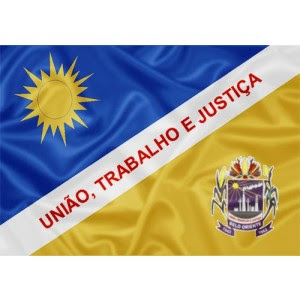
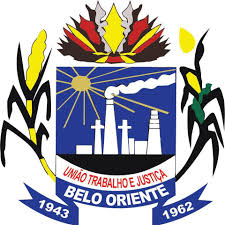
- Flag Coat of arms

- Location in Brazil
- Coordinates: 19°13′12″S 42°29′2″W
- Country: Brazil
- Region: Southeast
- State: Minas Gerais
- Mesoregion: Vale do Rio Doce
- Established: December 30, 1962

Population (2022 Census)
  - Total: 23,928
  - Estimate (2025): 24,546
- Time zone: UTC−3 (BRT)

Belo Oriente is a municipality in the state of Minas Gerais in the Southeast region of Brazil.

== See also ==
- List of municipalities in Minas Gerais
