= Pedra Dourada =

Brazilian municipality

Coordinates: 20°49′S 42°10′W

- Municipality
- Interactive map of Pedra Dourada
- Country: Brazil
- State: Minas Gerais
- Region: Southeast
- Time zone: UTC−3 (BRT)

Location of Pedra Dourada within Minas Gerais

Pedra Dourada is a Brazilian municipality located in the state of Minas Gerais. The city belongs to the mesoregion of Zona da Mata and to the microregion of Muriaé. As of 2020, the estimated population was 2,532.

== See also ==
- List of municipalities in Minas Gerais
