= Bom Jesus do Galho =

- Municipality
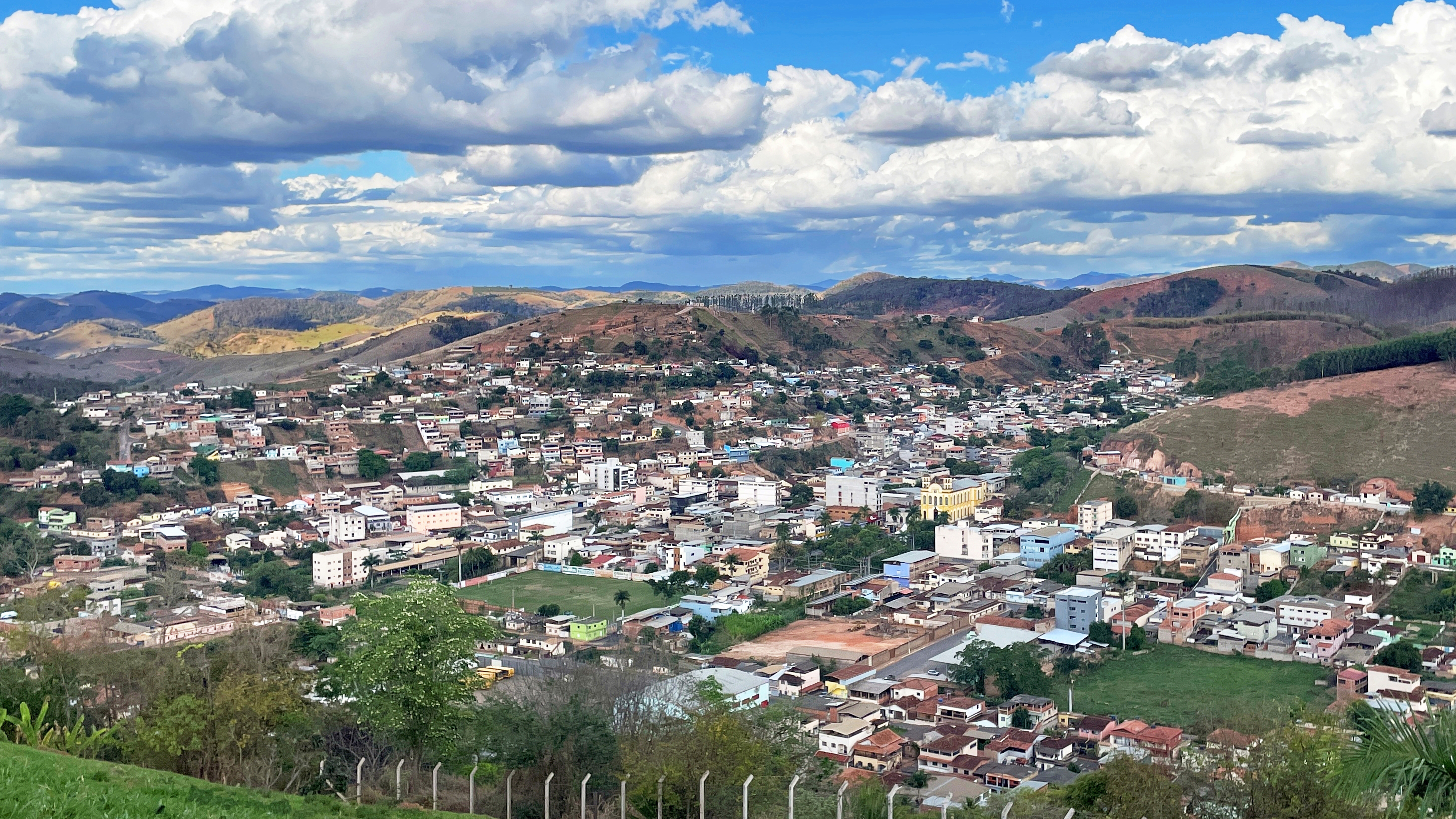
- Partial view of Bom Jesus do Galho seen from of the hill of the Cristo da Paz

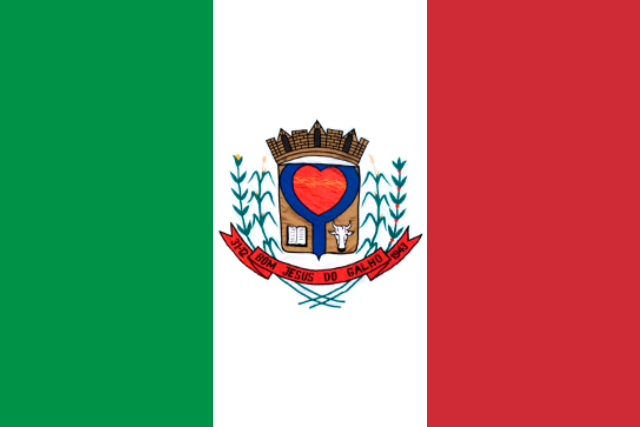
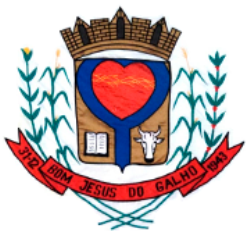
- Flag Coat of arms

- Location in Brazil
- Coordinates: 19°49′44″S 42°18′57″W
- Country: Brazil
- Region: Southeast
- State: Minas Gerais
- Mesoregion: Vale do Rio Doce

Population (2020)
  - Total: 14,862
- Time zone: UTC−3 (BRT)

Bom Jesus do Galho is a municipality in the state of Minas Gerais in the Southeast region of Brazil.

== See also ==
- List of municipalities in Minas Gerais
