= Alto Jequitibá =

- Municipality
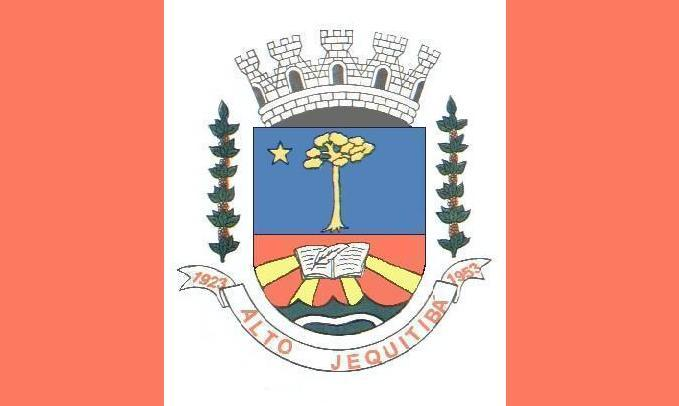
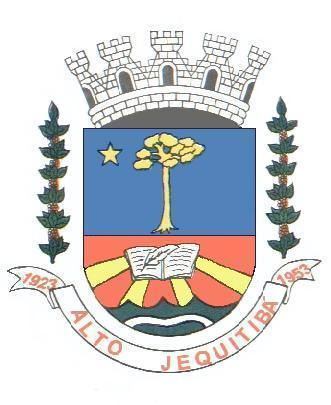
- Flag Coat of arms

- Location in Minas Gerais state

- Location in Brazil
- Coordinates: 20°25′15″S 41°57′31″W
- Country: Brazil
- Region: Southeast
- State: Minas Gerais

Area
  - Total: 152 km^{2} (59 sq mi)

Population (2020)
  - Total: 8,301
  - Density: 54.6/km^{2} (141/sq mi)
- Time zone: UTC−3 (BRT)

Alto Jequitibá is a Brazilian municipality in the state of Minas Gerais. It belongs to the mesoregion of Zona da Mata and to the microregion of Manhuaçu. The municipality has a population of 8,301 (2020) and its area is 152 km^{2} (59 sq mi).

== Geography ==
Settled in the highplanes among offshoots from the Pico da Bandeira, the third highest mountain of Brazil nearing 3,000 meters, in the Ocidental side of the Caparaó range of mountains. It is in the Brazil's Southeast in the bush's zone.

== Demographics ==
Alto Jequitibá is one of the few mainly Protestant cities of Minas Gerais, mainly Presbyterian.

== See also ==
- List of municipalities in Minas Gerais
