= Faria Lemos =

Brazilian municipality lin Minas Gerais

Coordinates: 20°48′S 42°01′W

- Municipality
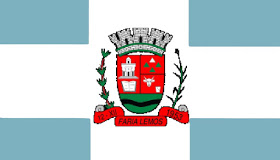
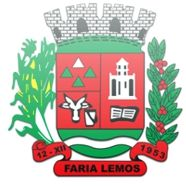
- Flag Coat of arms
- Interactive map of Faria Lemos
- Country: Brazil
- State: Minas Gerais
- Region: Southeast
- Time zone: UTC−3 (BRT)

Location of Faria Lemos within Minas Gerais

Faria Lemos is a Brazilian municipality located 263 km (162 mi) north-northeast of Rio de Janeiro in the state of Minas Gerais. The city belongs to the mesoregion of Zona da Mata and to the microregion of Muriaé. As of 2020, the estimated population was 3,221.

== See also ==
- List of municipalities in Minas Gerais
