= Santana do Manhuaçu =

Brazilian municipality located in the state of Minas Gerais

Coordinates: 20°06′28″S 41°55′30″W

- Municipality
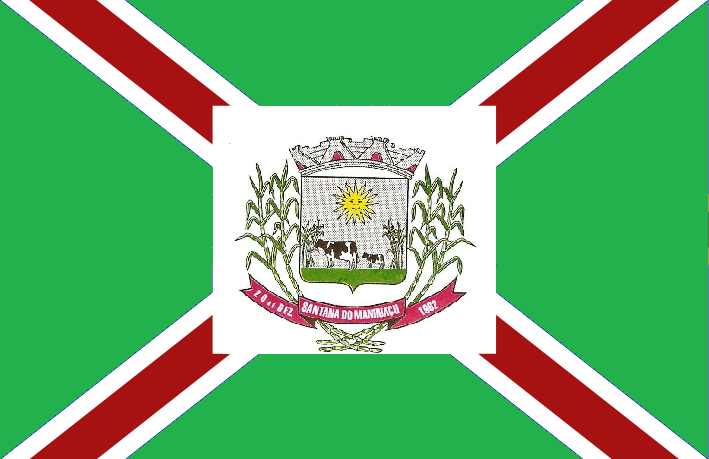
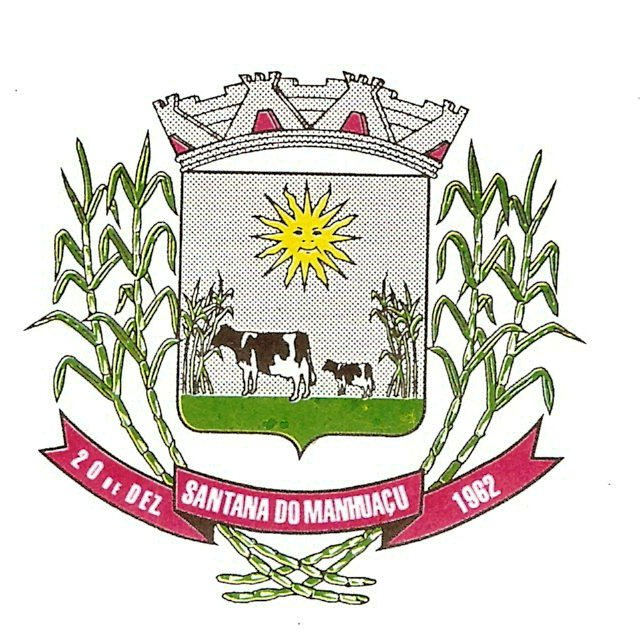
- Flag Coat of arms
- Interactive map of Santana do Manhuaçu
- Country: Brazil
- State: Minas Gerais
- Region: Southeast
- Time zone: UTC−3 (BRT)

Location of Santana do Manhuaçu within Minas Gerais

Santana do Manhuaçu is a Brazilian municipality located in the state of Minas Gerais. The city belongs to the mesoregion of Zona da Mata and to the microregion of Manhuaçu. As of 2020, the estimated population was 8,667.

== See also ==
- List of municipalities in Minas Gerais
