= Orizânia =

Brazilian municipality located in the state of Minas Gerais

Coordinates: 20°30′S 42°13′W

- Municipality
- Interactive map of Orizânia
- Country: Brazil
- State: Minas Gerais
- Region: Southeast
- Time zone: UTC−3 (BRT)

Location of Orizânia Alto within Minas Gerais

Orizânia is a Brazilian municipality located in the state of Minas Gerais. The city belongs to the mesoregion of Zona da Mata and to the microregion of Muriaé. As of 2020, the estimated population was 8,079.

== See also ==
- List of municipalities in Minas Gerais
