= Ipanema, Minas Gerais =

Coordinates: 19°48′03″S 41°42′46″W

- Municipality
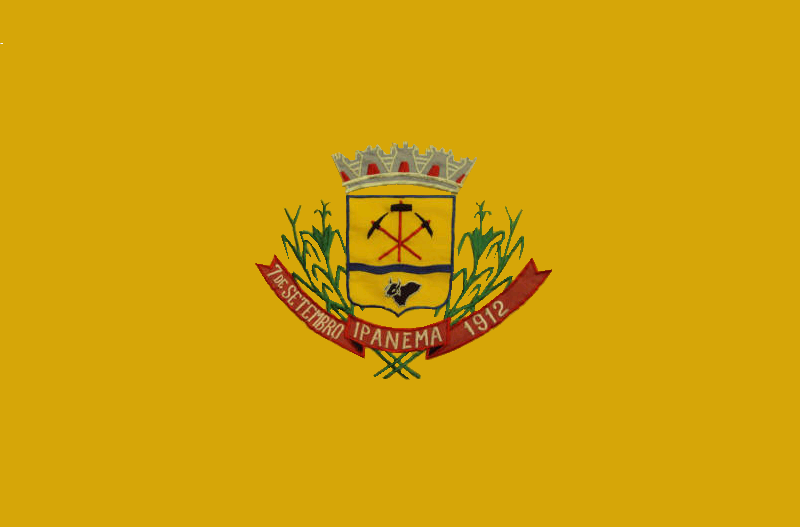
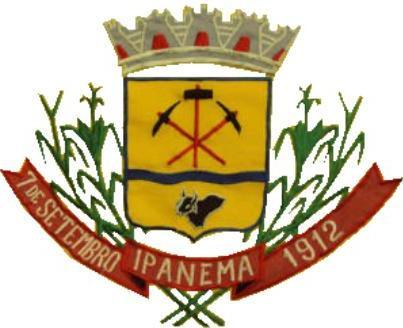
- Flag Coat of arms
- Interactive map of Ipanema, Minas Gerais
- Country: Brazil
- Region: Southeast
- State: Minas Gerais
- Mesoregion: Vale do Rio Doce

Population (2020)
  - Total: 20,000
- Time zone: UTC−3 (BRT)

Ipanema, Minas Gerais is a municipality in the state of Minas Gerais in the Southeast region of Brazil.

== See also ==
- List of municipalities in Minas Gerais
