= Manhuaçu =

- Municipality
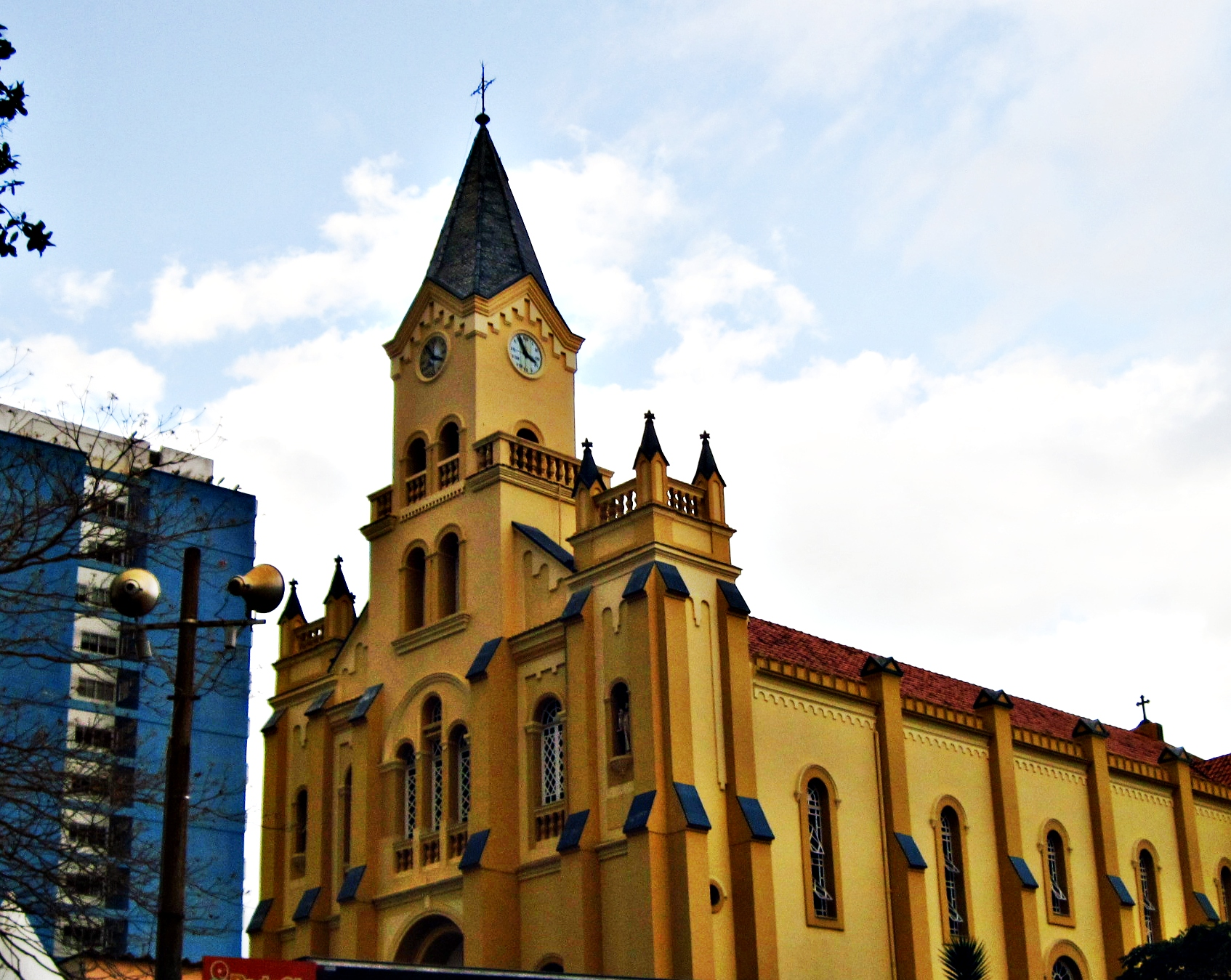

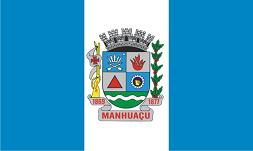
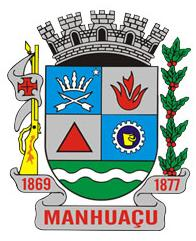
- Flag Coat of arms

- Location in Minas Gerais state

- Location in Brazil
- Coordinates: 20°15′29″S 42°2′1″W
- Country: Brazil
- Region: Southeast
- State: Minas Gerais

Area
  - Total: 628 km^{2} (242 sq mi)

Population (2020)
  - Total: 91,169
  - Density: 145/km^{2} (376/sq mi)
- Time zone: UTC−3 (BRT)

Manhuaçu is a municipality in Eastern Minas Gerais state, in Brazil. Its population was 91,169 (2020) and its area is 628 km^{2}.

== Geography ==
Located 260 km from the state capital of Belo Horizonte, it is near the important road junction of BR 262 (Belo Horizonte-Vitória) and BR 116 (Rio-Bahia). The total area of the municipality is 629 km^{2} and it lies at an elevation of 635 m in the foothills of the Serra da Chabata or Caparaó, which form the boundary between the states of Minas Gerais and Espírito Santo.

The main rivers are the Ribeirão do Manhuaçuzinho and the Manhuaçu River, which are tributaries of the Doce River.

Altitudes range from 561 metres (1,841 ft) at Foz do Rio São Mateu to 1,760 metres (5,770 ft) at Serra Pedra Dourada. Temperatures range from 16.6 °C (61.9 °F) to 27.5 °C (81.5 °F), with an average of 22.7 °C (72.9 °F). Annual rainfall averages 1,827 millimetres (71.9 in).

The municipality holds part of the Sossego Forest Biological Station.

=== Caparaó National Park ===
The Caparaó National Park is a national park administered by the Brazilian Institute of Environment and Renewable Natural Resources (IBAMA) and is located approximately 60 km southeast of Manhuaçu on the boundary dividing the states of Minas Gerais and Espírito Santo. The entrance to the park is at Alto Caparaó. The area of the park is 318 square kilometers.

It was created in 1961 by President Jânio Quadros. It contains the third highest peak in the country, the Pico da Bandeira (2,891 m). In 1859 Emperor Dom Pedro II had ordered that a flag of the Empire be placed on the highest peak of the Serra do Caparaó. It is believed that the name Pico da Bandeira is due to this fact. The mountains of the Caparaó chain have landscapes of great beauty with numerous waterfalls and caverns. There are also other important peaks like Pico do Cristal (2769.7 m) and Pico do Calçado (2.766 m).

== Economy ==
The economy of the city is based on the production and processing of mountain coffee. It is the center of commercialization of coffee of the Zona da Mata, and there are offices and warehouses of the main exporting and processing companies of the country. There are storage facilities for about one million sacks of coffee. The region harvests about 1.5 million sacks of coffee a year.

There are three schools of higher education, Faculdade do Futuro, Doctum and Facig - Faculdade de Ciências Gerenciais de Manhuaçu.

== Transportation ==
Manhuaçu is served by Elias Breder Airport.

== See also ==
- List of municipalities in Minas Gerais
