= Divino, Minas Gerais =

Brazilian municipality in the state of Minas Gerais

Coordinates: 20°36′52″S 42°08′55″W

- Municipality
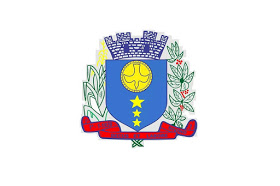
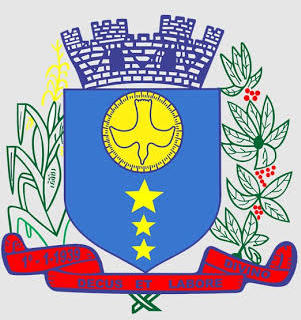
- Flag Coat of arms
- Interactive map of Divino, Minas Gerais
- Country: Brazil
- State: Minas Gerais
- Region: Southeast
- Time zone: UTC−3 (BRT)

Location of Divino within Minas Gerais

Divino is a Brazilian municipality located in the state of Minas Gerais. The city belongs to the mesoregion of Zona da Mata and to the microregion of Muriaé. Divino is 350 km away from the capital of the state of Minas Gerais.

Divino was founded on 25 January 1939. The economy is based on agriculture, particularly coffee crops and milk.

Its area is 338,716 km^{2}. As of 2020, it has an estimated population of 19,976 inhabitants.

== See also ==
- List of municipalities in Minas Gerais
