= Caparaó =

Brazilian municipality in the state of Minas Gerais

Coordinates: 20.521°S 41.907°W

- Municipality
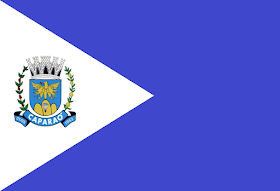
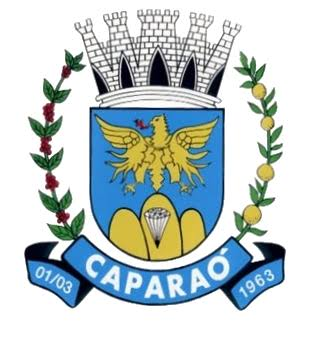
- Flag Coat of arms
- Interactive map of Caparaó
- Country: Brazil
- State: Minas Gerais
- Region: Southeast
- Time zone: UTC−3 (BRT)

Location of Caparaó within Minas Gerais

Caparaó is a Brazilian municipality located in the state of Minas Gerais. The city belongs to the mesoregion of Zona da Mata and to the microregion of Manhuaçu. The elevation of the city is 843m. As of 2020, the estimated population was 5,451.

== See also ==
- List of municipalities in Minas Gerais
