= Pico da Bandeira =

Mountain in Brazil

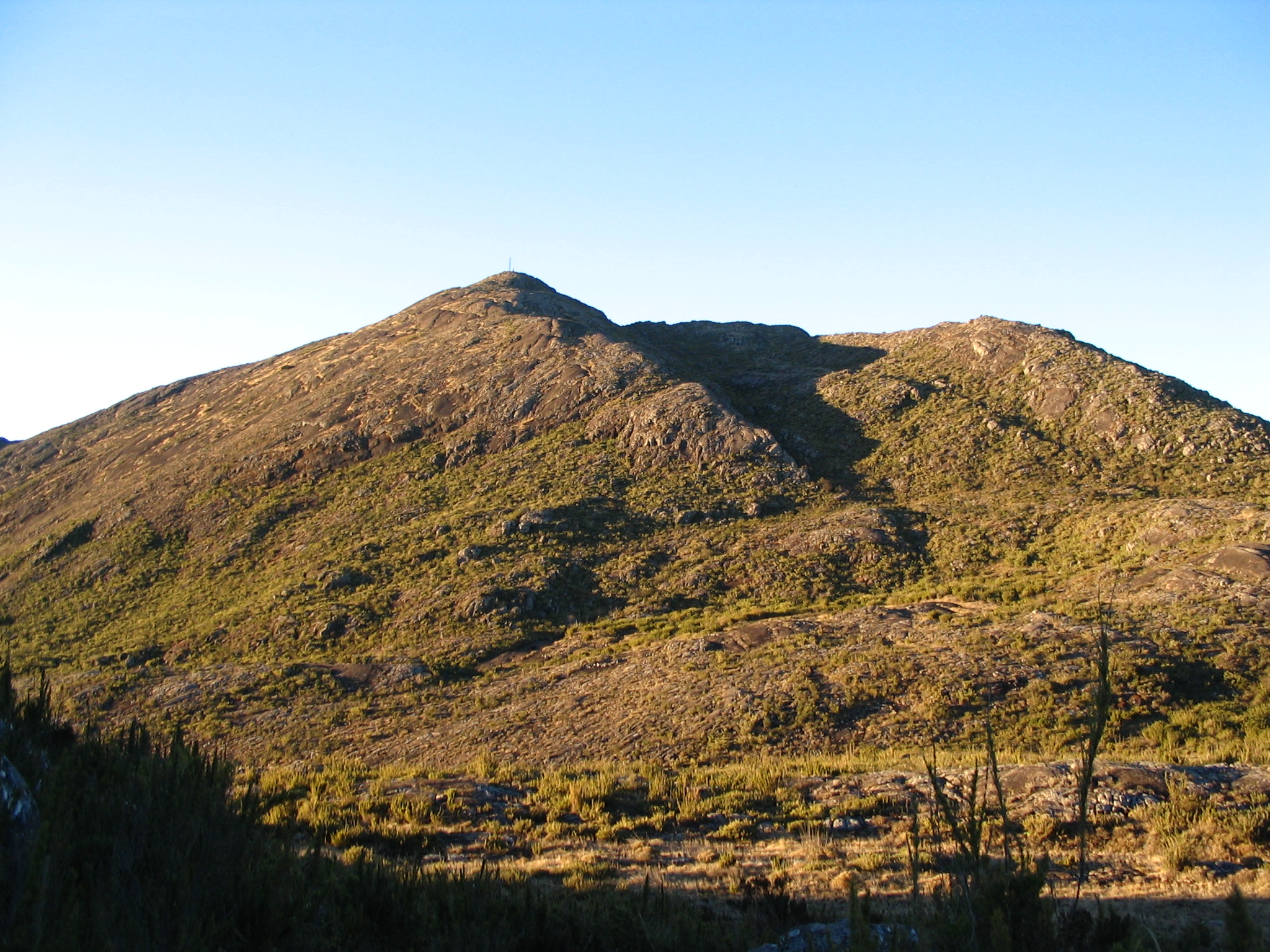

Highest point
- Elevation: 2,892 m (9,488 ft)
- Prominence: 2,640 m (8,660 ft)
- Listing: Ultra
- Coordinates: 20°26′07″S 41°47′47″W

Geography
- Location within Brazil
- Location: Espírito Santo, Minas Gerais, Brazil

Climbing
- Easiest route: Alto Caparaó (Minas Gerais)

Pico da Bandeira, or Bandeira Peak (Portuguese for Flag Peak, pronounced [ˈpiku dɐ bɐ̃ˈdejɾɐ]), is the highest mountain in Brazil outside of the Amazon, the third overall, situated on the border of Espírito Santo and Minas Gerais states. It is the highest point in both states. It was considered the highest mountain in Brazil until 1965, when Pico da Neblina and Pico 31 de Março, next to the Venezuelan border, were explored, measured, and both found to be higher. The peak is said to have been so named after Pedro II, Emperor of Brazil, ordered a flag to be flown on top of it. Pico da Bandeira is ranked 21st by topographic isolation.

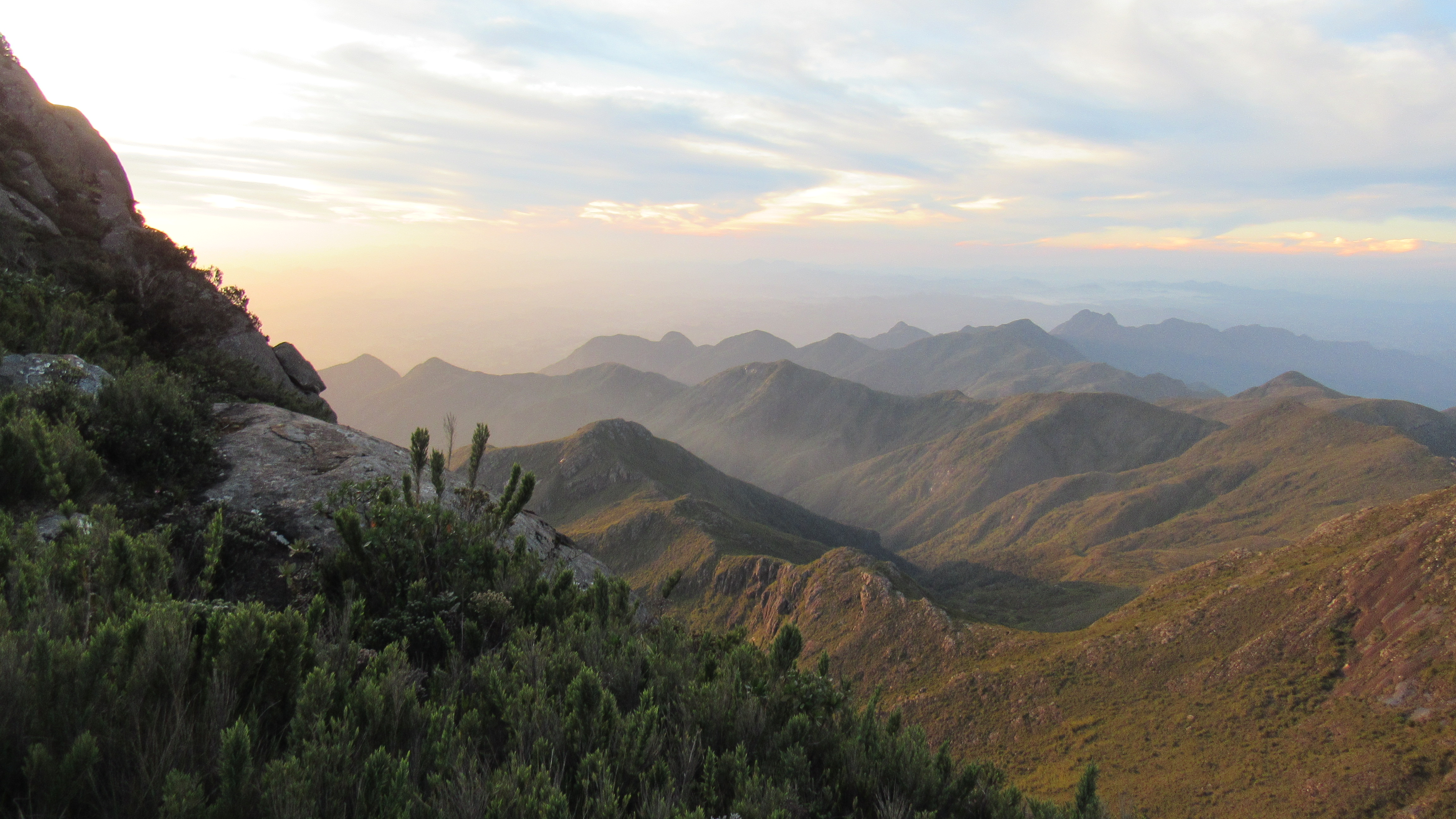
Mountain view in the surroundings of Bandeira Peak.

Pico da Bandeira is remarkable for being the Brazilian mountain with the greatest topographic isolation: 2,344 kilometres (1,456 mi). This means that at less than that distance, there is no other point on the surface of the Earth at equal or greater elevation. In the Americas, only Aconcagua, Denali, Pico de Orizaba, and Mount Whitney are more topographically isolated than Pico da Bandeira, and in the entire world, there are only 20 more-isolated mountains.

Its summit bedrock is migmatite and around the summit lies granulitic gneiss.

It is one of the major attractions of Caparaó National Park (Portuguese: Parque Nacional do Caparaó), accessible from the nearby town of Alto Caparaó. That town and the entrance to the park lie in Minas Gerais, but the summit of Pico da Bandeira lies in Espírito Santo.

The summit is accessible to hikers of most age groups, with only very limited fitness requirements. The track from the park entrance to the summit track (8 km; 5.0 mi) can be driven by most vehicles, and the summit track itself runs for approximately 9 km (5.6 mi), with a further 1,000-metre (3,280 ft) climb.
