= Alto Caparaó =

Brazilian municipality in the state of Minas Gerais

Coordinates: 20°31′S 41°54′W

- Municipality
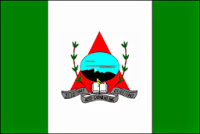
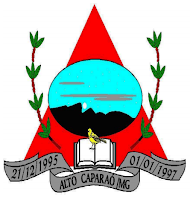
- Flag Coat of arms
- Interactive map of Alto Caparaó
- Country: Brazil
- State: Minas Gerais
- Region: Southeast
- Time zone: UTC−3 (BRT)

Location of Alto Caparaó within Minas Gerais (red dot close to Espírito Santo)

Alto Caparaó is a Brazilian municipality in the state of Minas Gerais. The city belongs to the mesoregion of Zona da Mata and to the microregion of Manhuaçu. As of 2020 its population is estimated to be 5,894.

== Geography ==
=== Climate ===
Climate data for Alto Caparaó (1981–2010)
Month	Jan	Feb	Mar	Apr	May	Jun	Jul	Aug	Sep	Oct	Nov	Dec	Year
Mean daily maximum °C (°F)	28.4 (83.1)	29.2 (84.6)	28.5 (83.3)	27.3 (81.1)	25.0 (77.0)	24.3 (75.7)	24.0 (75.2)	25.1 (77.2)	26.0 (78.8)	26.8 (80.2)	27.2 (81.0)	27.5 (81.5)	26.6 (79.9)
Daily mean °C (°F)	22.0 (71.6)	22.4 (72.3)	21.8 (71.2)	20.4 (68.7)	17.5 (63.5)	16.1 (61.0)	15.8 (60.4)	16.8 (62.2)	18.7 (65.7)	20.3 (68.5)	21.2 (70.2)	21.6 (70.9)	19.6 (67.3)
Mean daily minimum °C (°F)	18.0 (64.4)	17.7 (63.9)	17.6 (63.7)	15.5 (59.9)	12.4 (54.3)	10.2 (50.4)	10.0 (50.0)	10.7 (51.3)	13.5 (56.3)	15.8 (60.4)	17.4 (63.3)	17.9 (64.2)	14.7 (58.5)
Average precipitation mm (inches)	248.7 (9.79)	131.3 (5.17)	165.8 (6.53)	65.2 (2.57)	29.6 (1.17)	14.8 (0.58)	12.1 (0.48)	25.3 (1.00)	39.3 (1.55)	100.5 (3.96)	208.6 (8.21)	281.5 (11.08)	1,322.7 (52.07)
Average precipitation days (≥ 1.0 mm)	16	10	12	7	5	2	2	3	4	8	14	16	99
Average relative humidity (%)	78.8	78.0	80.6	80.8	81.5	81.4	78.9	75.9	74.5	75.9	78.7	79.8	78.7
Mean monthly sunshine hours	170.5	202.8	190.9	195.7	195.0	196.5	205.9	219.5	189.0	173.9	154.3	162.1	2,256.1
Source: Instituto Nacional de Meteorologia

== See also ==
- List of municipalities in Minas Gerais
