= Doutor José Maria Morais Hospital =

Brazilian Hospital

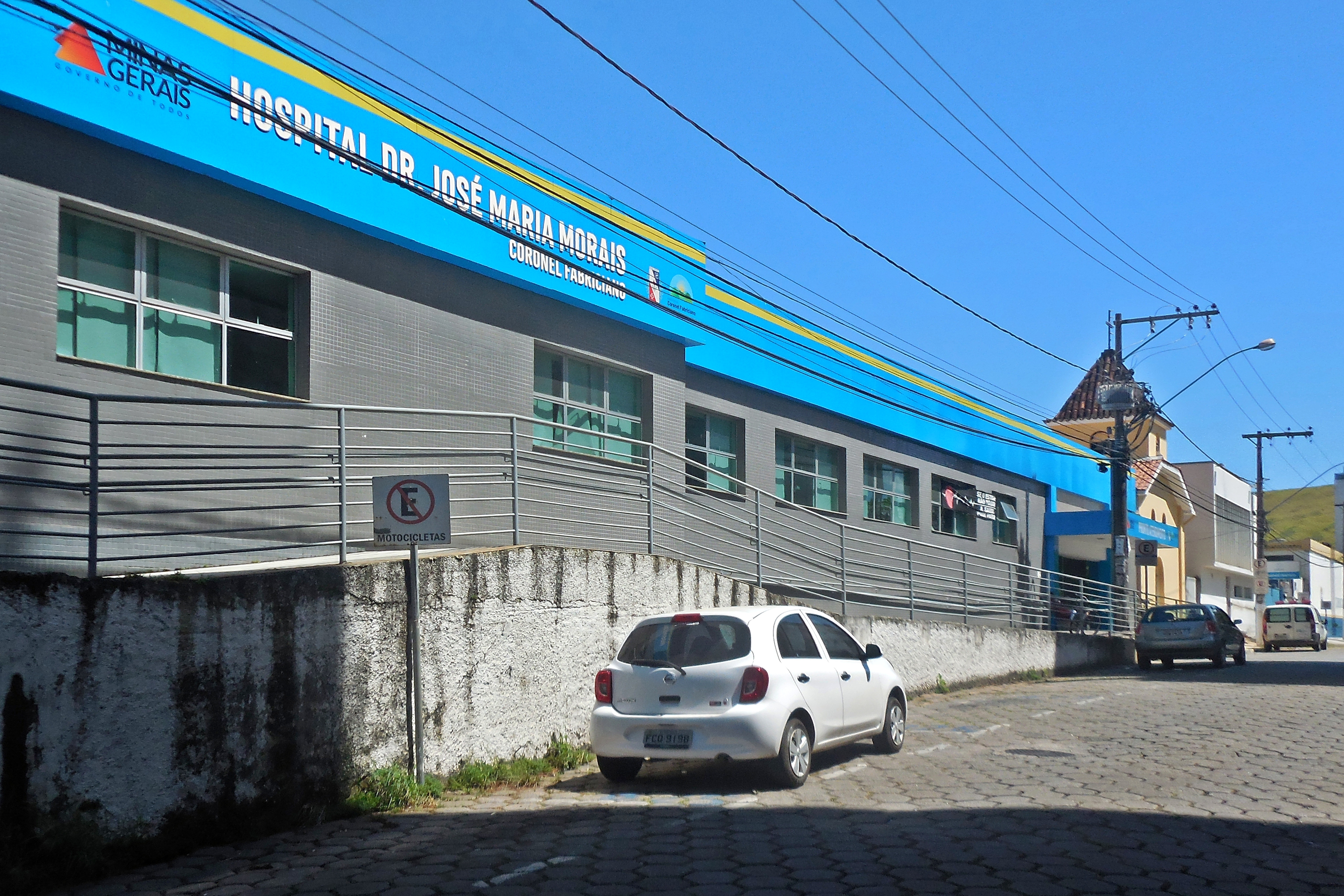
- Facade of the Doutor José Maria Morais Hospital

Geography
- Location: Coronel Fabriciano, Minas Gerais, Brazil
- Coordinates: 19°31′35″S 42°37′27″W

Services
- Beds: 134 (July 2017)

History
- Former names: Siderúrgica Hospital; São Camilo Hospital
- Opened: 1937; Reopened: August 30, 2012; July 7, 2017

Doutor José Maria Morais Hospital (formerly Siderúrgica Hospital and later São Camilo Hospital) is an institution located in the Brazilian city of Coronel Fabriciano, in the interior of the state of Minas Gerais. It was created by Belgo-Mineira in 1936, due to an epidemic of tropical diseases that the town was facing at the time.

The hospital is located at Argemiro José Ribeiro Street, in the Santa Helena neighborhood, and is one of the main health centers in the region providing services through the Unified Health System (SUS); it is financed by the state and municipal governments and managed by the City Hall. It is responsible for health care in the Coronel Fabriciano zone, which involves municipalities in the Vale do Aço and its metropolitan area.

== History ==
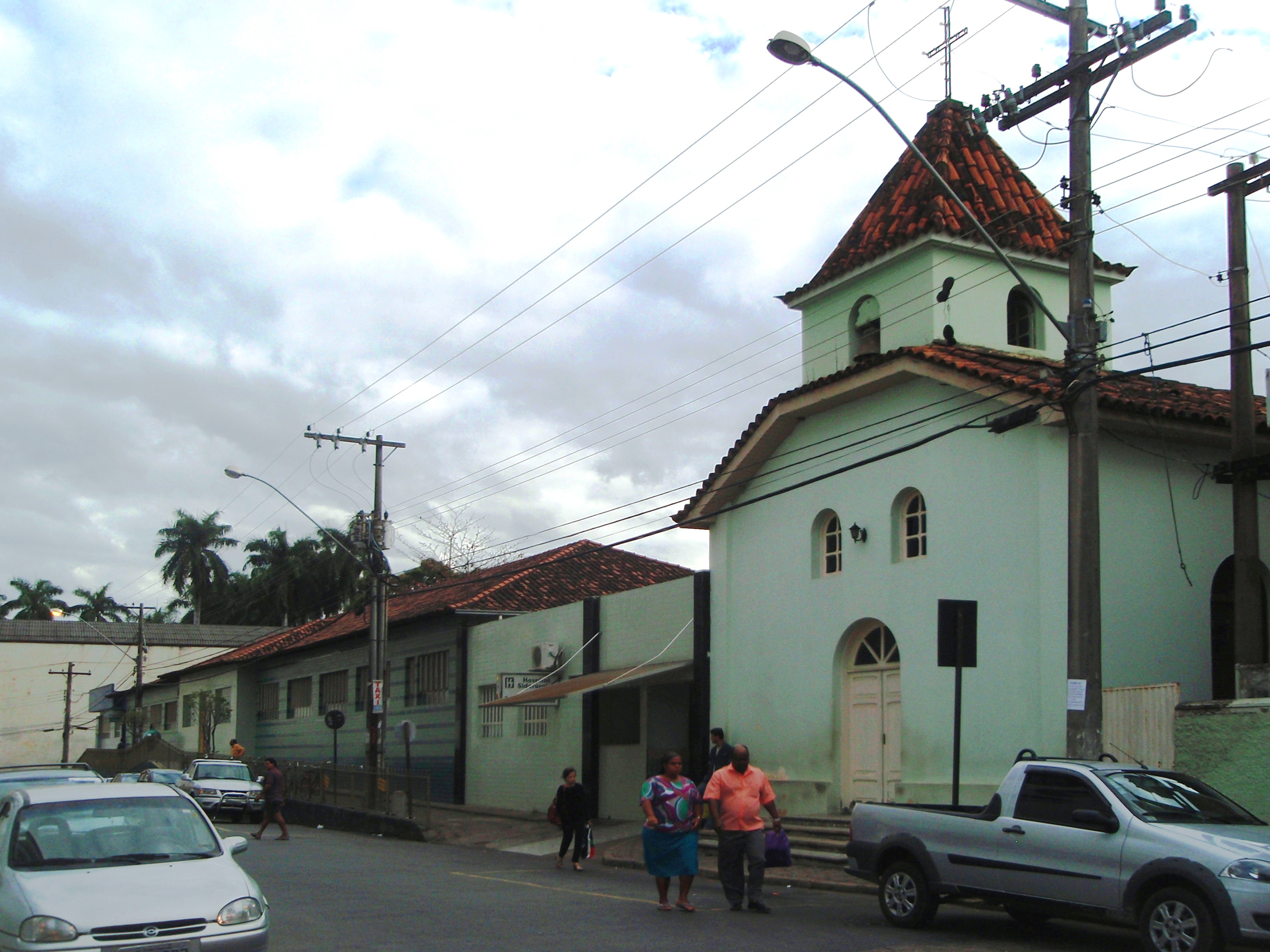
The then Siderúrgica Hospital in 2010

An epidemic of tropical diseases that had been affecting the area of today's Vale do Aço, due to the closed forest and tropical climate, led to the creation of the then Siderúrgica Hospital by the Companhia Siderúrgica Belgo-Mineira in 1936. The unit, idealized by Belgo-Mineira's president at the time, Louis Ensch, from Luxembourg, was initially intended to attend the company's employees and remained as the only large health center in the area until the mid-1960s.

Its establishment was encouraged by Joaquim Gomes da Silveira Neto, Belgo-Mineira's superintendent in the then Melo Viana district, subordinated to Antônio Dias, and its first doctors were Moacyr Birro, Getúlio de Melo, José Riscala Albeny, and Rubem Siqueira Maia, the latter having become the first elected mayor of Coronel Fabriciano, emancipated in 1948. In 1938, the hospital was taken over by the Daughters of Charity of Saint Vincent de Paul, under the supervision of the local chaplain Canon Domingos Martins. In the same year, management was granted to the nuns of the congregation of the Sisters of Our Lady of Sorrows, who ran the health center until 1960. Under the influence of Dom Helvécio Gomes de Oliveira, archbishop of Mariana, the Chapel of Our Lady Help of Christians was built next to the hospital and concluded in 1942. It was a reference to the patron saint of the Salesians, the congregation to which Dom Helvécio belonged. A cloister connected to the chapel, formed by a corridor with several rooms, served as shelter for the Sisters of Our Lady of Sorrows.

The construction of the chapel was funded with donations from the hospital's own employees, who allowed part of their monthly salaries to be destined to the works. Finally, Joaquim Gomes donated the image of the saint. The temple was used for some of the celebrations of the local Catholic community, which later originated the Saint Sebastian Parish. The Daughters of Charity of Saint Vincent de Paul attended the hospital until 1947, when they were replaced by the Carmelite Sisters, who were involved in the creation of Colégio Angélica. In the 1960s, the health unit was acquired from Belgo-Mineira by physician José Maria Morais, with the support of José Riscala Albeny and later, Walter Winter Maia.

=== Possible closure and change of provider ===
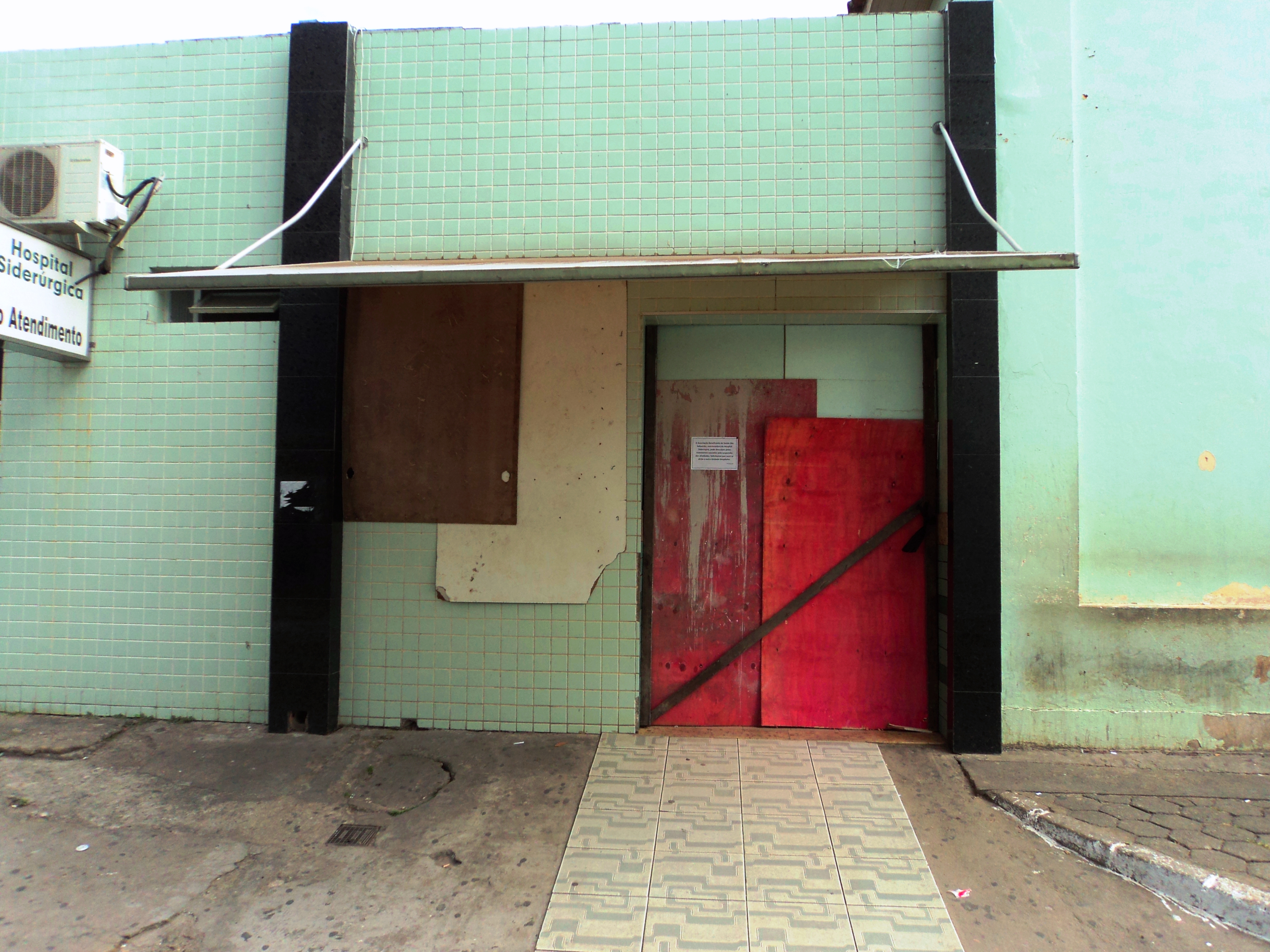
Closed entrance to the emergency room at Siderúrgica Hospital on July 21, 2011

In the 2000s, the then Siderúrgica Hospital was going through financial difficulties and in 2009, it was in a state of "pre-bankruptcy". At the time, it was among the main hospitals that provided public services to nearby municipalities, especially to the cities in the Vale do Aço metropolitan area, which have a shortage of hospital beds. The health center has been managed by the Saint Sebastian Health Beneficent Association (ABSSS), with about 80% of the revenue coming from the public service through the Unified Health System (SUS), but the maintainer claimed not to receive enough money from the municipal, state, and federal governments. In addition, due to the lack of release of the certificate from the National Social Assistance Council (CNAS), which brings fiscal and tax regularization to the entity, the unit was closed on July 15, 2011, leaving Coronel Fabriciano without SUS care.

Until its closing, the Siderúrgica hospital had handled around 65 thousand emergency cases and 7,200 hospitalizations a year. The situation was considered a public calamity and affected hospitals in the neighboring municipalities, by suddenly increasing the demand for public services. The problem involved the Union, the State, and the City Hall, and on September 15, 2011, it was defined that the Saint Camillus Charitable Society would be the new maintainer of the health center. In May 2012, the State Health Secretariat announced that the hospital would reopen under the name São Camilo Hospital on August 30, 2012 after undergoing renovations and that the service would become micro-regional, via SUS, serving Fabriciano and seven other municipalities of the Vale do Aço metropolitan area. The new architectural project was conceived by architect Lígia Marta Silva Araújo.

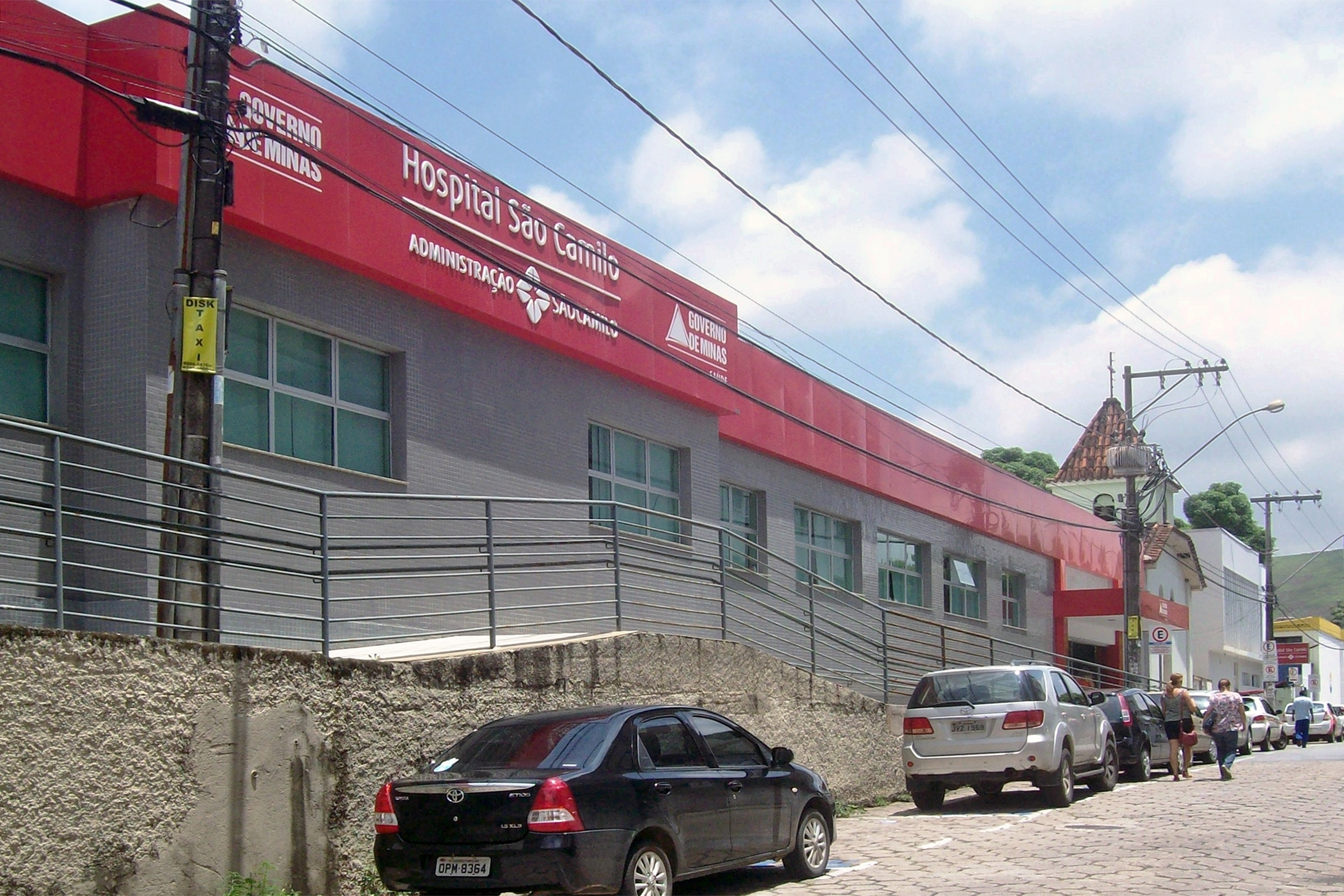
Partial view of the then São Camilo Hospital in 2015

The lack of transfer of funds from the state government to the Saint Camillus Charitable Society resulted in ongoing financial problems at the hospital, impaired care, and threats of shutdown in 2016 and 2017. The contract with the society came to an end in May 2017, when Mayor Marcos Vinícius da Silva Bizarro announced that the city government would take over the management of the hospital and changed its name to Doutor José Maria Morais Hospital, in reference to one of the first doctors and a partner of the former Siderúrgica Hospital, who died in September 2016.

Despite the concession of the administration to the City Hall, the state should still maintain the transfer of funds for the maintenance of the health center, according to the signed agreement, which also provided for the continuity of the micro-regional service. The hospital had been operating with 60 beds, of which 50 were infirmary beds and ten ICU beds, while the other 72 were still unfinished. However, on May 29, 2017, the service was suspended for the second time in the last six years, once the transition of the new administration had not yet been completed and the cession of the property to Coronel Fabriciano City Hall was only finalized on June 1.

On June 12, 2017, money was passed on to the city government, which announced the reopening of the hospital on June 21. The official reopening took place on July 7, 2017, under the presence of health leaders, mayors of municipalities in the region, and representatives of the state government. The event also celebrated the reopening of the pediatric beds, which had not been offered since 2012. It was also announced that, in addition to the 60 beds that were reopened, another 74 in a newly built wing were already waiting to be released for use. Despite the reopening, the lack of payments led the state government to maintain a million-dollar debt with the hospital over the following months.

== Chapel of Our Lady Help of Christians ==
Located next to the health center complex, the Chapel of Our Lady Help of Christians, inaugurated in 1942, received religious celebrations until 1970, when it was no longer maintained by the hospital. In 1974, it began to operate for funerals. Due to its historical and cultural relevance to the city, both the chapel and the cloister located inside it were declared a municipal cultural heritage site on March 31, 1997. The temple again received religious celebrations from the Saint Sebastian Parish in 2000, with masses taking place weekly on Fridays, but it became disused with the closing of the hospital in 2011. In the following years, the chapel remained in a state of abandonment, until it underwent a restoration carried out by the municipal administration, through funds from the Municipal Cultural Heritage Fund, between 2018 and 2019, allowing the return of the celebrations. Its reinauguration took place on May 24, 2019, the saint's day, with a mass at St. Sebastian Cathedral followed by a procession to the chapel.

The chapel presents an unadorned facade, composed of a centralized entrance door and, above it, two small lintel openings in a perfect round arch. Above these, the central nave meets the roof, where the volume of the central tower emerges, whose interior houses the bells. Its structure is made of reinforced concrete and solid brick sealing. The roof of the nave has a gable ceramic roof, while the tower has four gables. Inside there is a choir, accessible by a staircase that begins after the main entrance. The side facades have windows, but it is possible to open only the windows on the right, as the openings on the left have been covered by a hospital wall. The floor inside contains hydraulic tile and the high altar has wooden floor tiles, with an altarpiece in wood carving and traces comparable to Baroque and Rococo. A door provides direct access to the hospital, and at the back of the chapel is the cloister.

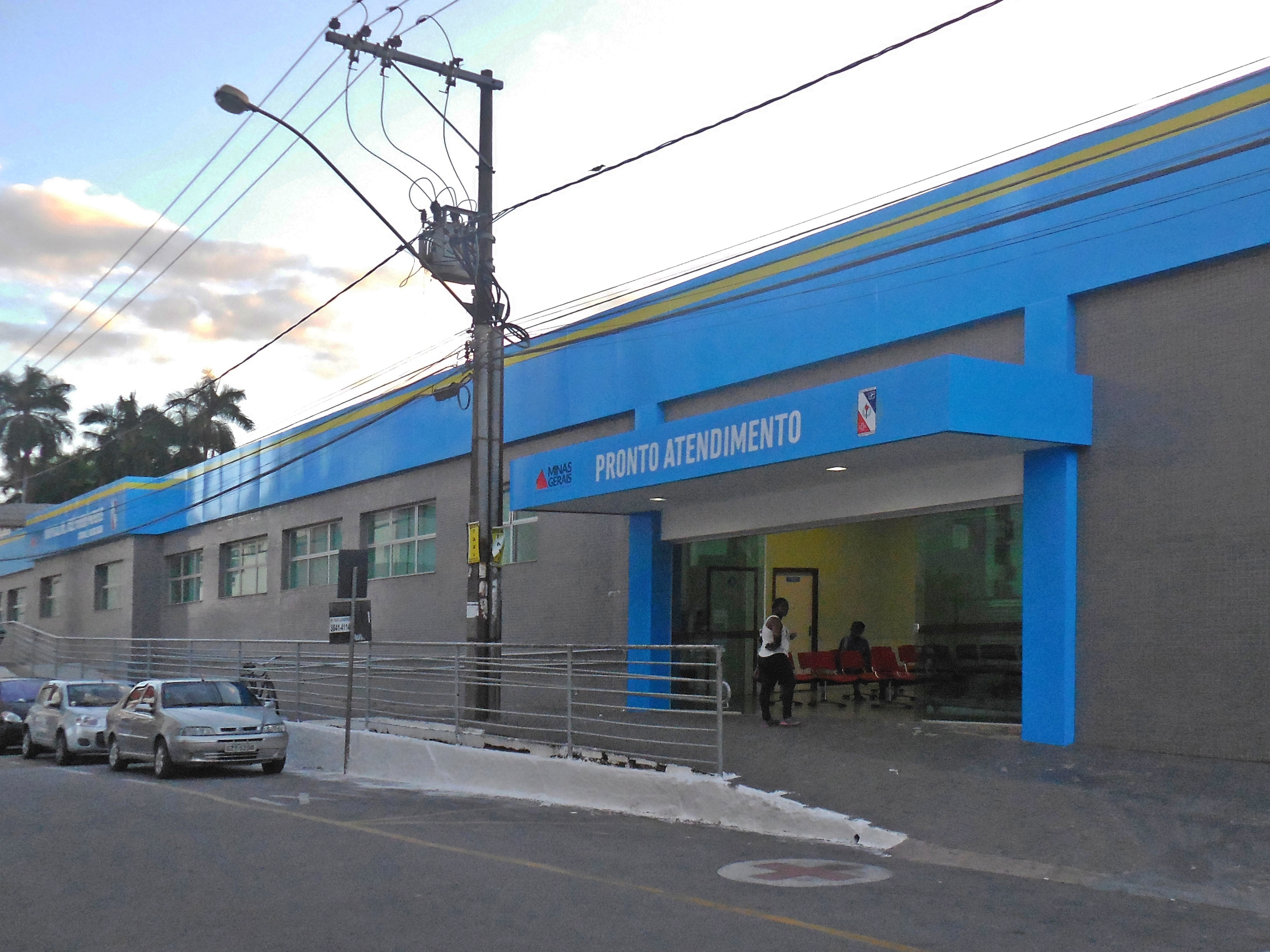
Emergency Room at Dr. José Maria Morais Hospital after its reopening in 2017

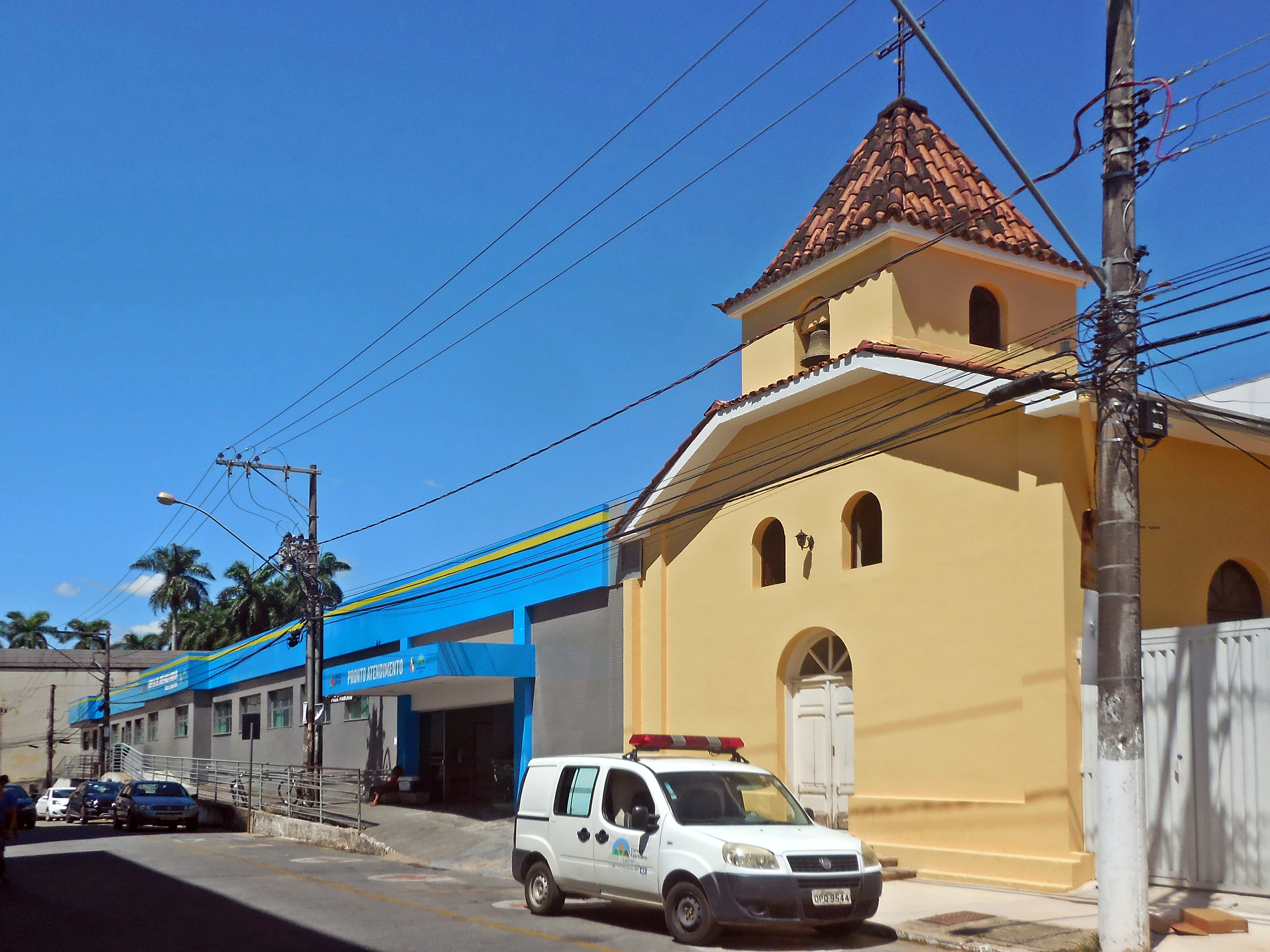
Chapel of Our Lady Help of Christians and Dr. Jose Maria Morais Hospital

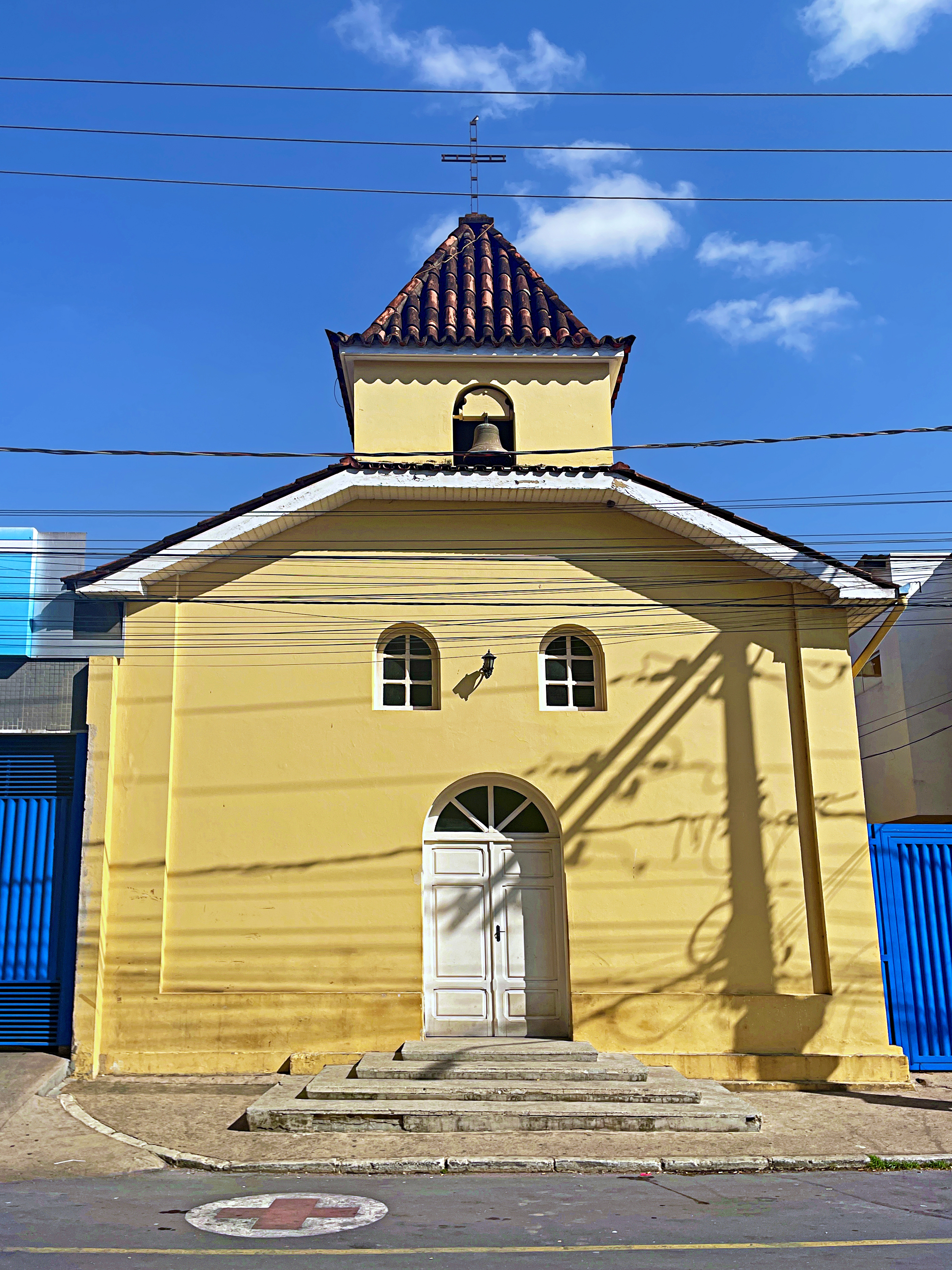
Facade of Chapel of Our Lady Help of Christians

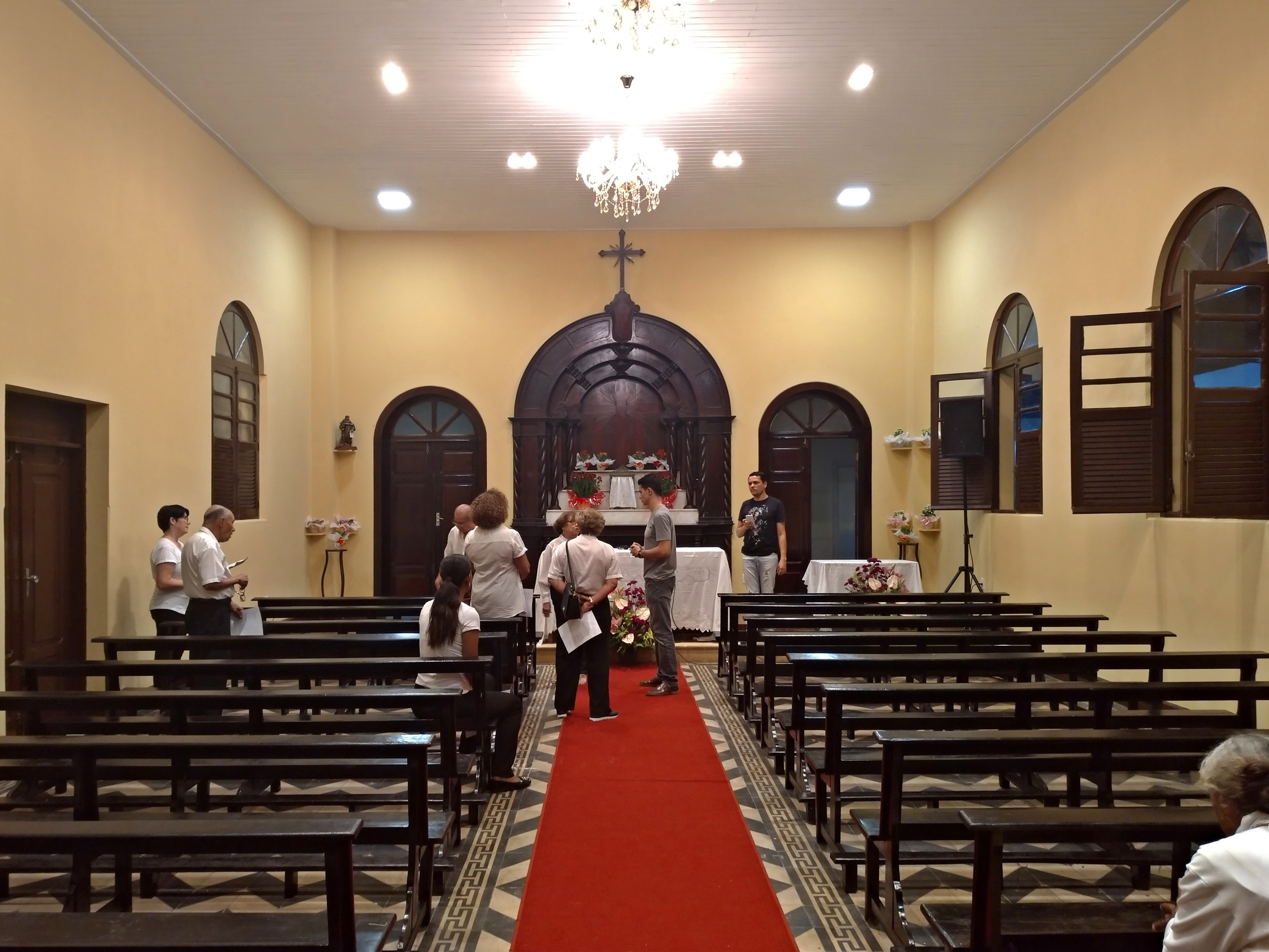
Interior of the Chapel of Our Lady Help of Christians after its restoration in 2019

== See also ==
- Vale do Aço Metropolitan Area
