= Serra dos Cocais =

Mountain chain in Brazil

Coordinates: 19°27′S 42°46′W

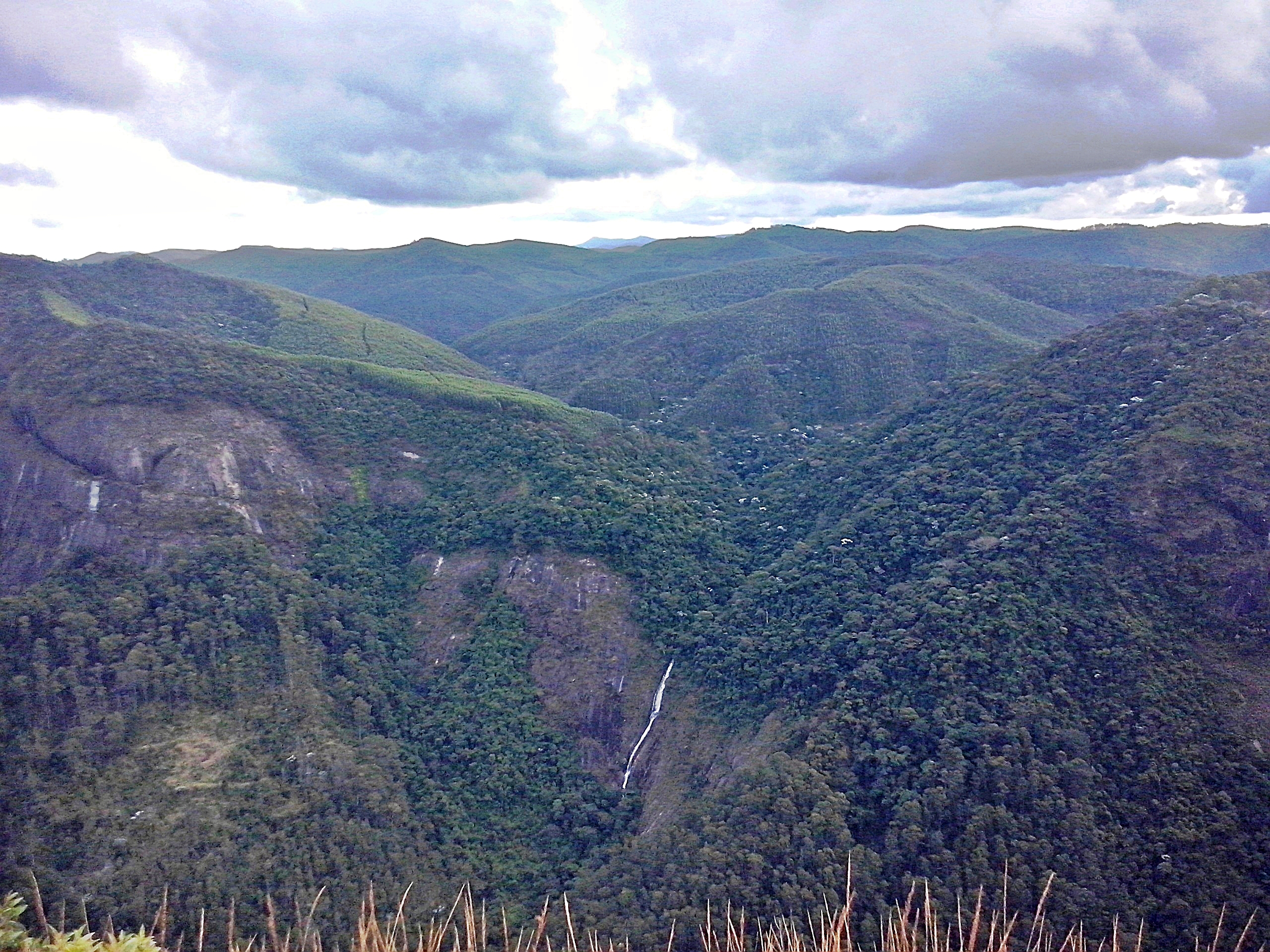
- Cachoeirão, a waterfall located in the middle of the Serra dos Cocais mountains and the native Atlantic forest in contrast to surrounding eucalyptus plants.

Highest point
- Elevation: 1,200 m (3,900 ft)

Geography
- Location: Coronel Fabriciano, Minas Gerais, Brazil

Geology
- Rock age: 600 million years

The Serra dos Cocais (English: Cocais Mountains) is a mountain chain located in the Brazilian municipality of Coronel Fabriciano, in the interior of the state of Minas Gerais. It is part of the geologic province of the Espinhaço mountains and is composed of continuous blocks of granite over 600 million years old. Its altitude, which reaches a high point of 1200 meters above sea level, stands out from the surrounding terrain with average altitudes ranging between 500 and 800 meters. It contains an important remnant of the Atlantic Forest, in the middle of considerable reforestation with eucalyptus, and has been considered an area of environmental protection since 2002.

The population that lives on farms or in rural villages in the Serra dos Cocais is estimated to be about two thousand. It is located about 20 kilometers from the urban center of Coronel Fabriciano and possesses great tourist and cultural relevance, having several waterfalls and viewpoints, as well as housing folk groups that maintain diverse cultural traditions in their villages such as São José dos Cocais and Santa Vitória dos Cocais. Extreme sports such as mountain biking, climbing, backpacking, rappelling, and off-roading are quite common here.

== History and Geography ==
Monument to the Tropeiro in Santa Vitória dos Cocais, a reference to the tropeiros that have crossed the area since the 19th century.

Around 1825, a road was laid out by Guido Marlière linking the municipality of Antônio Dias to the Santo Antônio River, in the proximity of Naque, crossing the Serro dos Cocais where the village of São José dos Cocais would later be located. Later, the mountains were used as a path for tropeiros crossing the region from nearby cities. The name "Cocais" was given by the first residents of the area due to the large number of coconut trees (Portuguese: Coqueiros) present at the time of clearing.

Concerning its mountainous terrain, the average altitude ranges between 500 and 800 meters and its highest point is 1200 meters. The mountain range is part of the Espinhaço mountains geologic province, being composed of continuous blocks of granite whose rocks appear to have undergone pressure and temperature changes and are over 600 million years old. Besides its geologic importance, the Serra dos Cocais is considered a natural division between the hydrologic basins of the Piracicaba, Doce, and Santo Antônio rivers, containing hundreds of sources of small creeks and streams throughout its territory. Examples include the Alto, Cachoeira, do Cedro, do Cristal, dos Cocais, dos Gouveia, dos Machados, Frio, Lagoa, Melo Viana, Nova Estrela, Timirim streams, as well as the Caladão stream, which runs 10 kilometers emptying into the Piracicaba river, making up the Coronel Fabriciano urban perimeter. The Little Cocais Stream (total length 18 km) also flows into the Piracicaba river and its basin covers a good part of the Serra dos Cocais, with a total area of 129 km^{2}.

The native vegetation belongs to the Atlantic Forest domain, being considered an area of environmental preservation since 2002. However, there is a predominance of formerly deforested stretches that have given way to a reforestation of a monoculture of eucalyptus for the production of raw materials for the Cenibra pulp mill and production of charcoal for the local steelmakers such as Aperam South America and Usiminas. Concerning fauna, you can encounter guans, crested caracaras, and various species of hawks. As for flora, Tabebuia ochracea, Tibouchina mutabilis, bromeliads, and Attalea dubia are typical.

== Economy and Demographics ==
Main street of São José dos Cocais, with eucalyptus plantations in the background.

Eucalyptus Plantations near Santa Vitória dos Cocais.

The population that inhabit the mountains is estimated to be about two thousand. The population live on farms or in rural villages, principally Santa Vitória dos Cocais and São José dos Cocais, as well as the communities of Barra de Nova Estrela, Córrego do Cristal, Córrego do Sóter, Córrego dos Avelino, Córrego dos Bertoldo, Córrego dos Cedro, Córrego dos Germano, Córrego dos Machado, Córrego dos Pinto, Córrego dos Vieira, Córrego Timirim, Gouveia, Mandioca Assada, and Nova Estrela. According to the Brazilian Institute of Geography and Statistics (IBGE), the population of the urban center of Santa Vitória in 2010 was 349 inhabitants in 130 private households while the population of São José dos Cocais was 219 inhabitants in 71 households.

The first commercial establishments in the area were opened in the 1950s and until the 1980s, the predominant economic activity revolved around agriculture, cattle raising, and coffee plantations. These began to be replaced by the production of wood destined for the industries of the Vale do Aço (Steel Valley). As in several cities in the Doce river valley, the Cenibra pulp company started paying small producers to grow eucalyptus on their properties for the company's pulp mills in Belo Oriente, instead of growing their own crops for subsistence. The population, however, has been declining and migrating to the urban zone of the Vale do Aço metropolitan area, looking for better job and income opportunities.

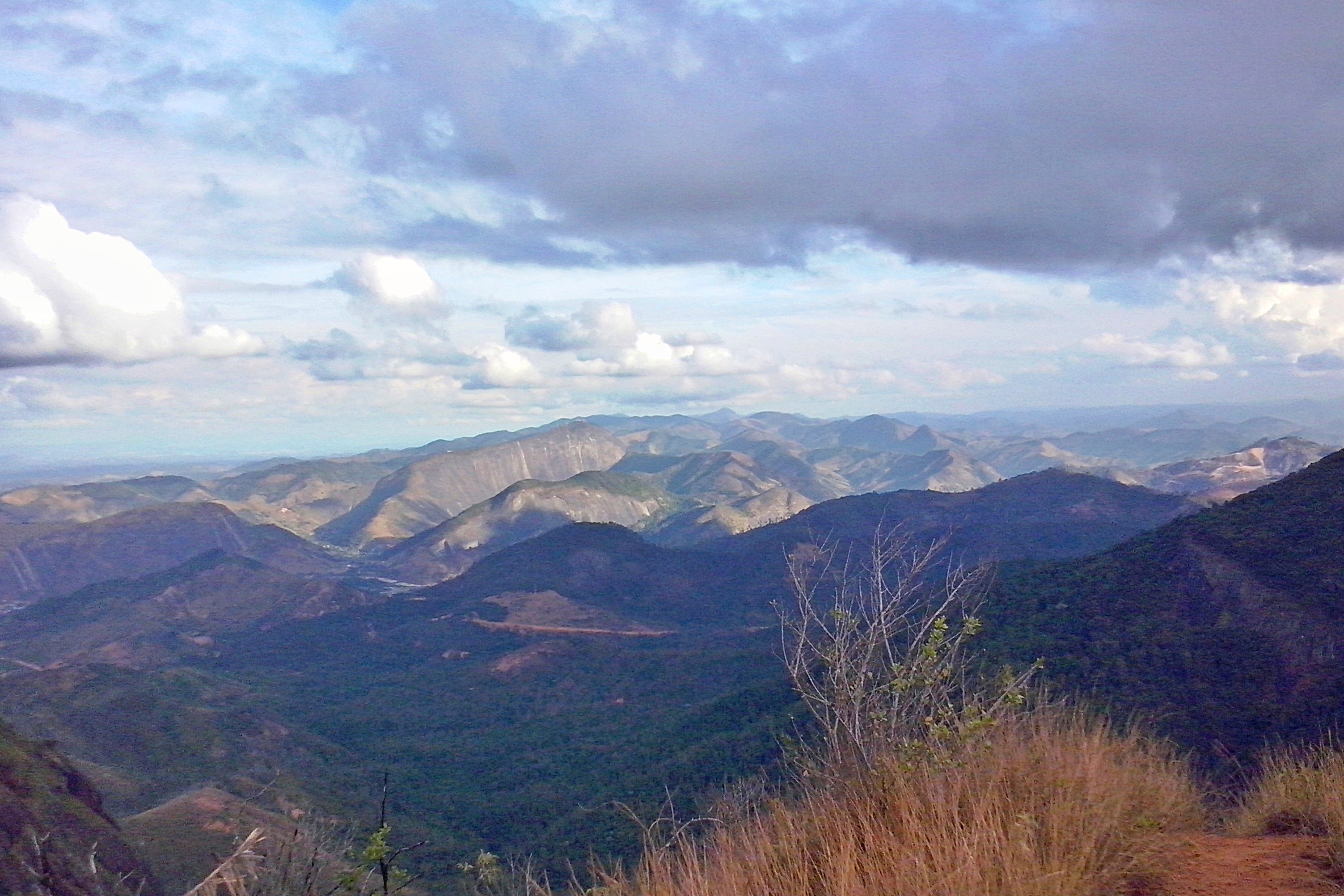
Mountainous terrain in the Serra dos Cocais

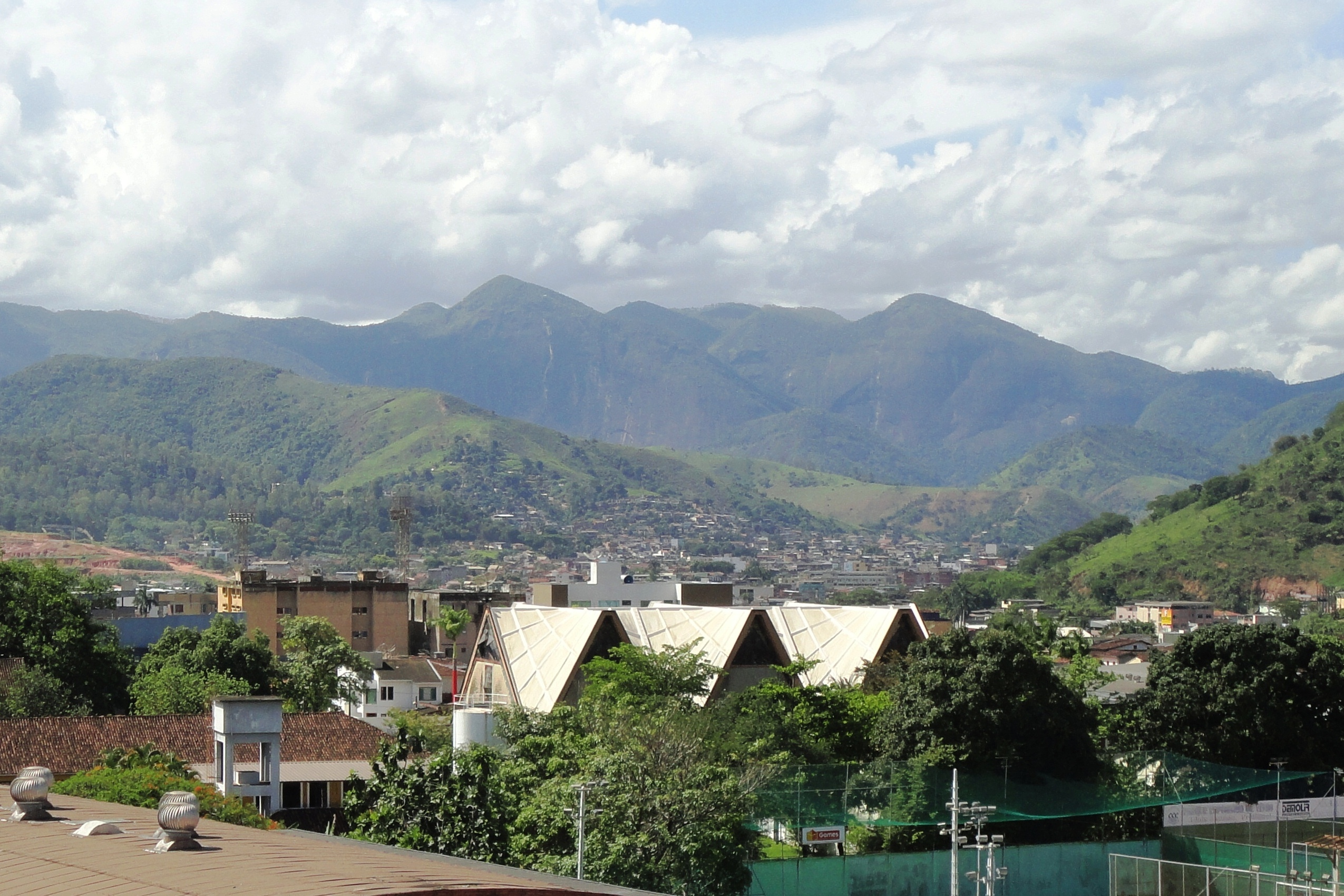
Urban zone of Coronel Fabriciano with the Serra dos Cocais on the horizon.

Various projects have been implemented with the objective of reducing the rural exodus, such as training courses in tourism, cooking, fish farming, and beekeeping, as well as food handling and assistance with family farming that guarantee products for school lunches in some municipal schools in the city and for sale in open markets. At the Organic Popular Market, held every week in the Floresta neighborhood of Coronel Fabriciano, there are various producers selling pesticide-free foods grown in the Serra dos Cocais as well as stands selling local crafts. The Serra dos Cocais make up a large part of the total primary sector production of Coronel Fabriciano, principally in the form of fruits, vegetables, and other agricultural products.

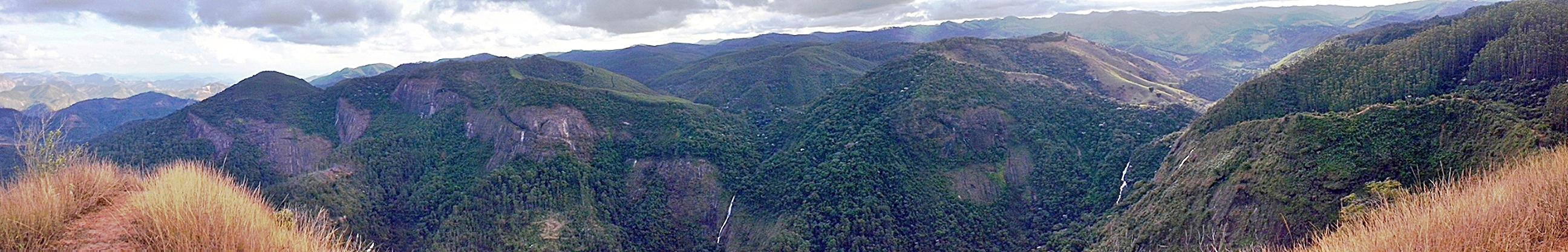
Panorama of the Serra dos Cocais from the Cachoeirão viewpoint. It is possible to see the Cachoeirão waterfall (in the center) and the José Felicíssimo waterfall (on the right).

São José chapel in São José dos Cocais, declared a municipal cultural heritage site.

== Culture and Recreation ==
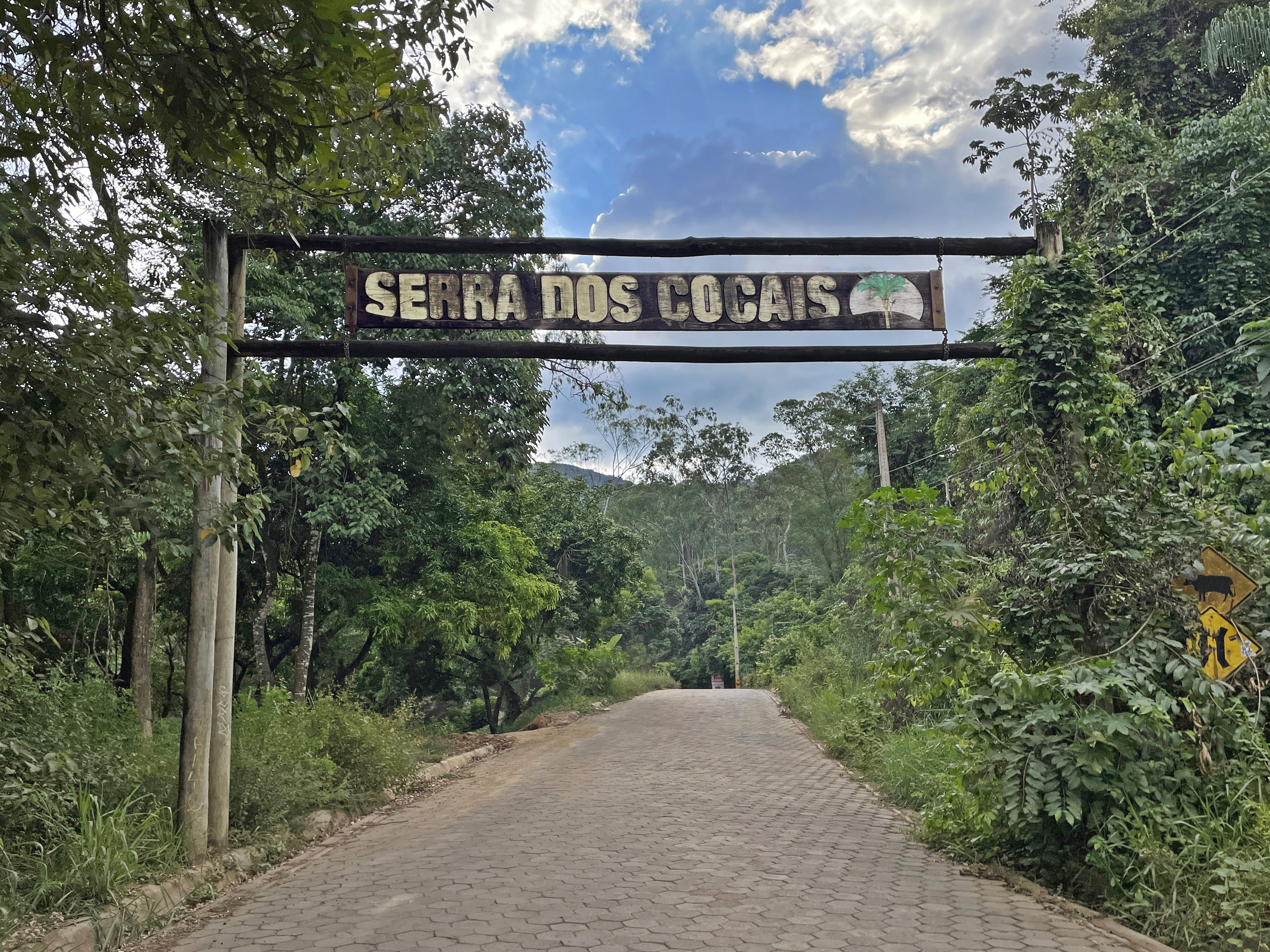
Entrance gate to the Serra dos Cocais.

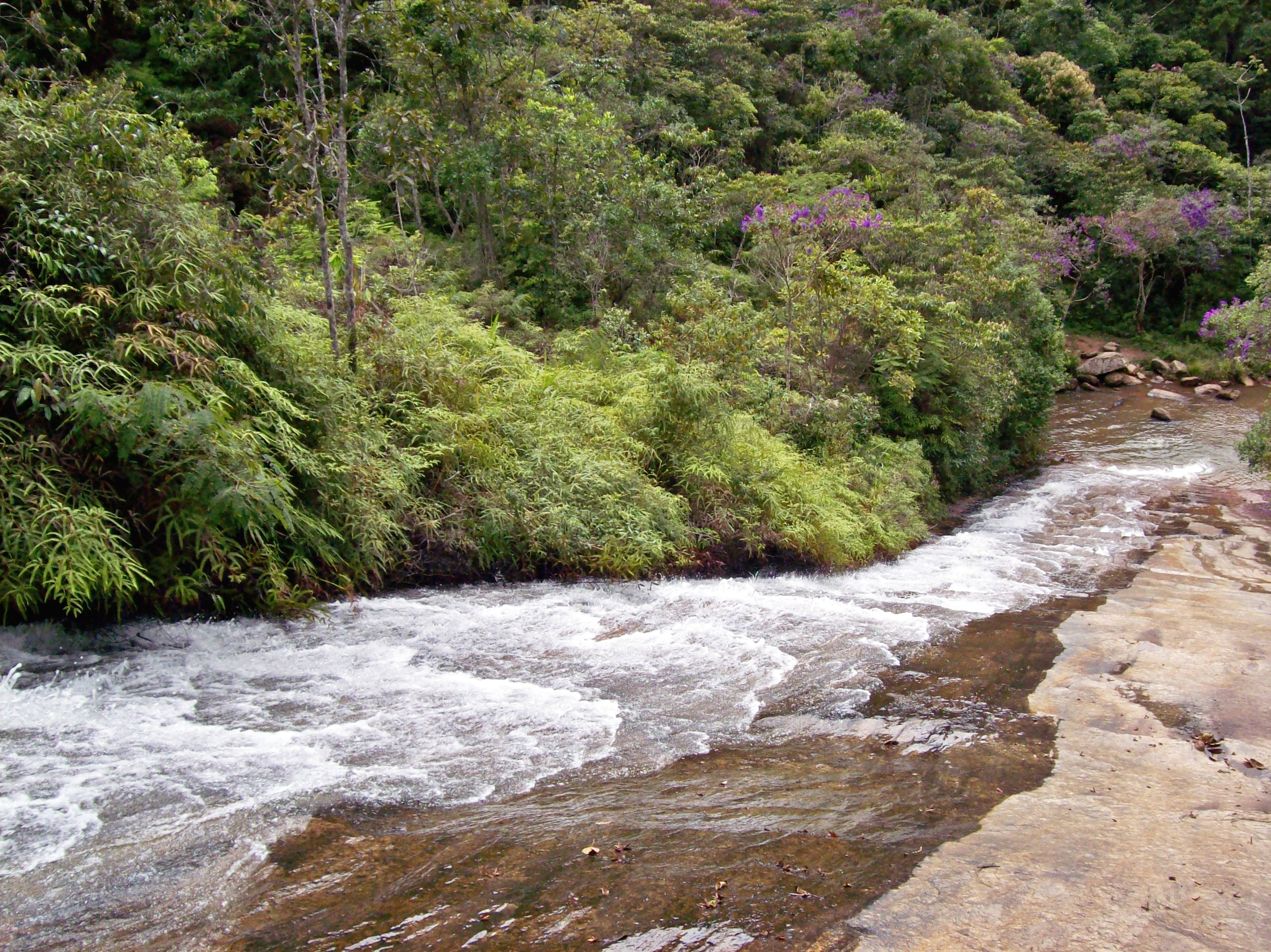
Escorregador Waterfall, on the course of the Little Cocais River.

The Serra dos Cocais is part of the Atlantic Forest Tourist Circuit of Minas Gerais, which was created in 2001 and restructured by the Secretary of State and Tourism in December 2009 with the objective of stimulating ecological and cultural tourism in the Vale do Aço metropolitan region. In a survey conducted by the city of Coronel Fabriciano in April 2012, the Serra dos Cocais was chosen as the tourist spot that best represents the municipality with 58% of the votes. In Santa Vitória dos Cocais the Nossa Senhora da Vitória chapel and the São José chapel in São José dos Cocais were declared a cultural heritage sites of Coronel Fabriciano. Another landmark of Santa Vitória is the Monument to the Tropeiro which was constructed with steel plates and donated by the Emalto Group in 2016.

One of the main cultural institutions is the Marujada dos Cocais, a traditional group of Marujada dancers that sings marches and tributes for Our Lady of the Rosary on the anniversary of the founding of Coronel Fabriciano (January 20) and during celebrations in the Santa Vitória dos Cocais community, where the group is located. The handcrafts of the villages are also very representative of the local culture, being made of materials from the forest and marketed at popular markets. In addition, extreme sports such as mountain biking, climbing, backpacking, rappelling, and off-roading are popular in the area. The local off-roading club, Jipe Clube Vale do Aço, frequently organizes off-road tours and competitions on the trails of the Serra dos Cocais.

Tourists also often visit the various waterfalls and viewpoints. Notable sites include: the Pedra Dois Irmãos (Two Brothers Rock) which can be accessed by a steep trail through thick woods, and from where you can see the entire Vale do Aço; the Pedra dos Cem Homens (Rock of the Hundred Men) which is also constantly used by climbers; the Pedra do Caladão located near the Caladão neighborhood from where you can see various points in the city; the Escorregador Waterfall whose stones form a kind of natural toboggan run; the Cachoeirão Waterfall which is about 120 m high and is known as a popular backpacking location being surrounded by a green belt of remaining Atlantic Forest; and the Biquinha de Santa Vitória (Saint Victoria's Bikini) which is a natural spring of drinking water located near Santa Vitória dos Cocais. Other sites include the Limeira and Manoela Waterfalls, Zé Martin's Waterfall, and the Mamucha trails.
