= Colégio Angélica =

Private school in Brazil

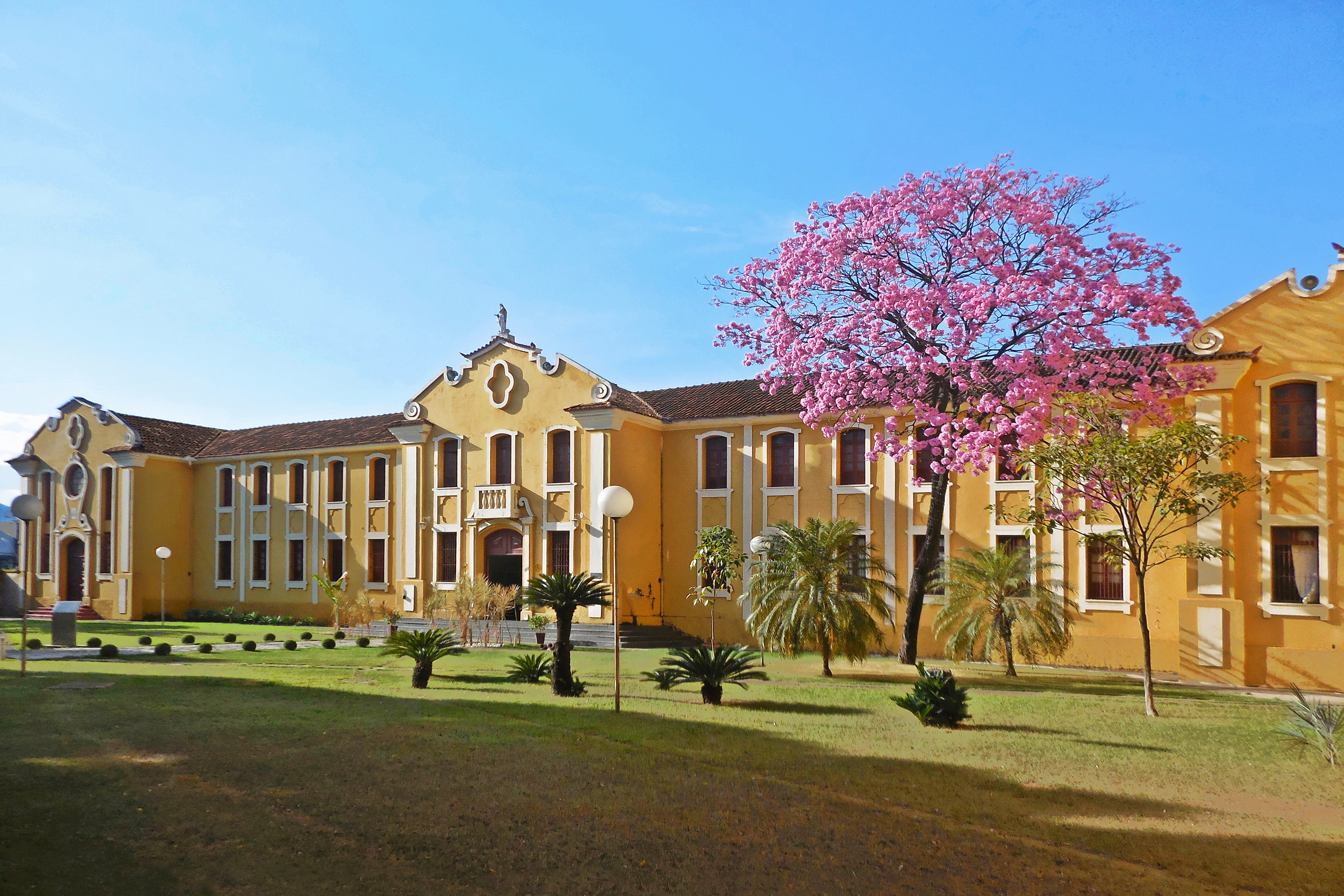
- Facade of Colégio Angélica

Location
- 128 Maria Mattos Street; Coronel Fabriciano, Minas Gerais; 35170-111; Brazil
- 19°31′08″S 42°37′44″W

Information
- Type: Private school
- Established: September 5, 1950
- Colors: Yellow, blue and white
- Website: http://www.colegioangelica.com

Escola Normal Nossa Senhora do Carmo e Ginásio Angélica, also known as Colégio Angélica (English: Angélica College), is an educational institution in the Brazilian municipality of Coronel Fabriciano, in the interior of the state of Minas Gerais. It was created in 1950 under the administration the Congregation of the Carmelite Sisters of Divine Providence, which maintained the school until 2011. Since 2016, the Catholic Institute of Minas Gerais (ICMG) has been responsible for the institution, providing nursary, primary, elementary, and vocacional school.

The school's facade, which still maintains the original design, was declared a cultural heritage site in 1997. The elements of its front facade are repeated in a symmetrical way, and the wood-framed windows cover almost all sides. In December 2015, due to a possible closure of the institution, the entire building was declared a municipal heritage site, preventing any changes in its physical structure or removal of material goods.

== History ==
=== Creation and consolidation ===
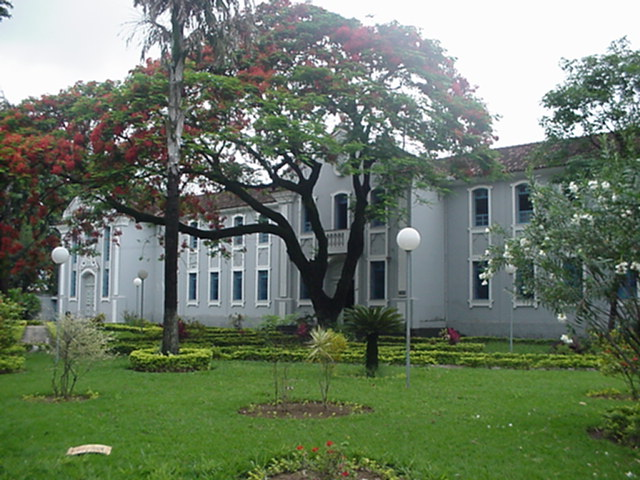
Colégio Angélica in 2007.

The Congregation of the Carmelite Sisters of Divine Providence, defined as the institution's keeper, settled in Coronel Fabriciano in 1947 in order to handle the procedures related to the school's construction. During the construction work, the Congregation was involved in providing services at the Siderúrgica Hospital (currently the Doutor José Maria Morais Hospital). The Carmelite nuns Nazareth, Beatriz and Izaura, along with the director Mother Ester de Cristo Rei, were the first to settle in Coronel Fabriciano.

On September 5, 1950, the Escola Normal Nossa Senhora do Carmo, also known as Colégio Angélica, was founded by the Archbishop of Mariana, Dom Helvécio Gomes de Oliveira, being the first big school in Coronel Fabriciano. Its cornerstone was laid on September 26, 1950, starting the construction work. The name by which it is popularly called honors Angélica Rosa da Silveira, mother of Joaquim Gomes da Silveira Neto, local superintendent of Belgo-Mineira, who donated the land for the school's construction. The following inscription is registered on a plaque on the school premises:

Dom Helvécio Gomes de Oliveira, Archbishop of Mariana, founded this school, on September 5, 2005, for the formation of the youth of the Vale do Aço. The chaplain was the Most Reverend Father Antônio Rocha and the Superior General Mother Maria de Nossa Senhora da Glória.

— Inauguration plaque of Colégio Angélica

The school's architectural project was conceived by engineer Alderico Rodrigues de Paula, who was involved with the installation of Acesita - today Aperam South America - in the neighboring town of Timóteo, in partnership with his friend José Teodoro de Souza; Construtora Castanheira Ltda., based in Ponte Nova, was the company that executed the works. The bricks and roofing were produced in a pottery shop on the construction site itself, while the cement was imported from Europe. Although operation of the school began in 1952, construction was completed only in November 1956.

The activities started with nursary and primary school; however, it is worth mentioning that since 1928 there had been public education from first to fourth grade in the city. In 1955, Colégio Angélica became the first institution in Vale do Aço to provide a course equivalent to elementary school and, in 1962, the normal school started. Until 1968, there was also the boarding school regime due to the demand of students coming from neighboring cities, which was deactivated due to the creation of new schools. At the same time, the Carmelite Sisters extended their activities to other sectors of society, such as teaching catechism to children in their own facilities in support of the Saint Sebastian Parish and providing social assistance to the residents of Morro do Carmo, where they developed courses in handicrafts, cooking, cutting and sewing.

Between the 1960s and the 1980s, the nuns maintained a health center on the school premises primarily for pregnant women and children. In the late 1980s, part of Colégio Angélica's land was donated by the Carmelite Congregation for the construction of the Saint Sebastian Cathedral. The Arcebispo Dom Helvécio State School was also part of the Colégio Angélica complex; there, vulnerable students could have medical appointments and surgeries provided by the Carmelite Congregation, Lions Clubs International, and Rotary International. This school was demolished in 2009 to later give way to the Coelho Diniz Supermarket, after the land attached to the Colégio Angélica was sold by the Carmelite Sisters.

=== Closure ===
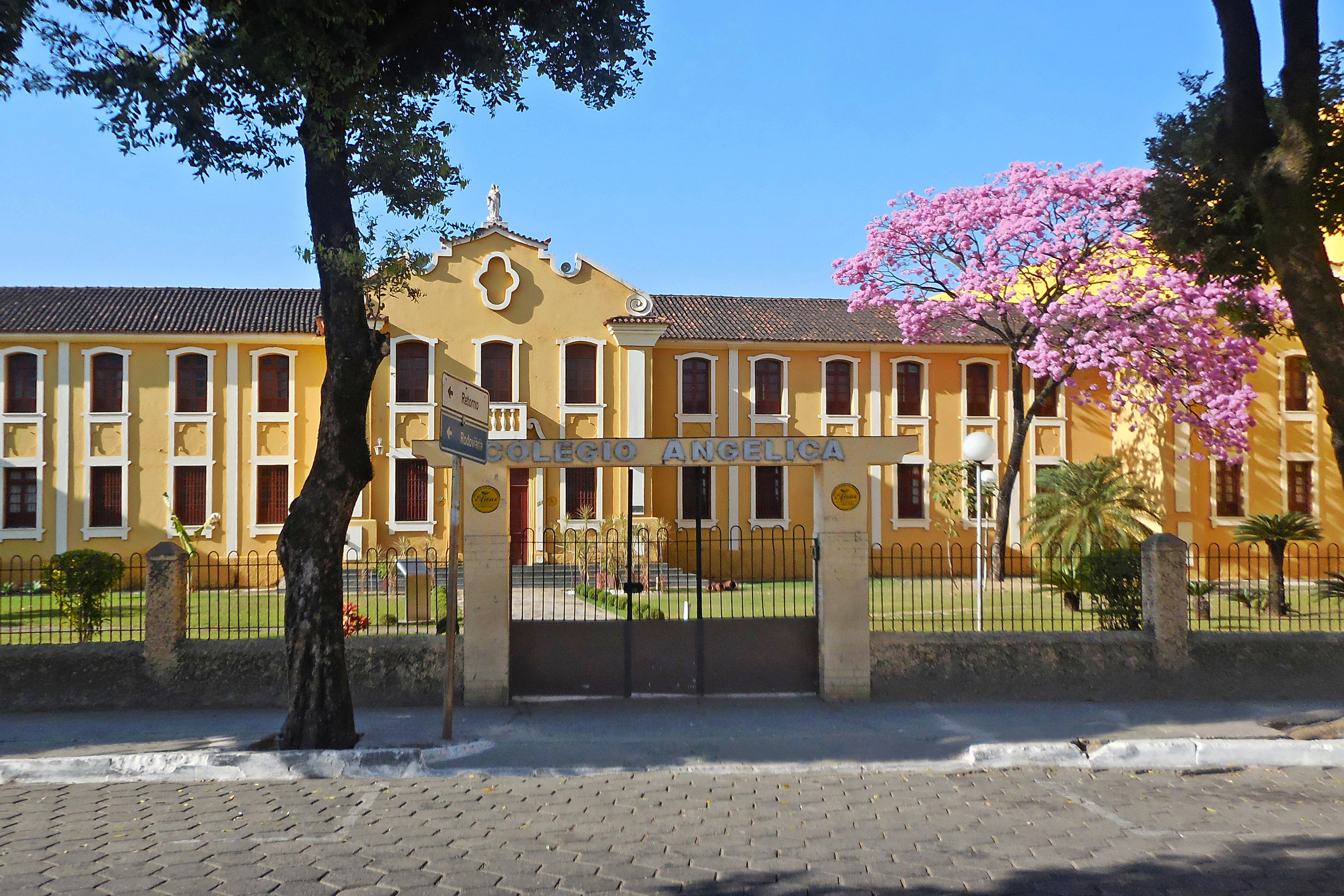
Main entrance of Colégio Angélica.

The 60th anniversary of Colégio Angélica, in 2010, was celebrated with festive solemnities and a section in the City Council of Coronel Fabriciano, where the bill granting the title of honorary citizenship to the Sisters Auxiliadora, Aracoeli and Donatila, benefactors of the school, was approved. It was the school with the best performance in the 2010 National High School Exam (Enem) in the municipality (fourth in the Vale do Aço Metropolitan Region), with 645.14 points.

In September 2011, the Carmelite Sisters, which operated the institution, announced that it would close at the end of the year, citing financial and bureaucratic difficulties. At the time, the school had 346 students and 45 employees. Demonstrations against the closure were held in the city, and parents formed a committee to press for measures that would keep the school open. On October 19, it was announced that the Congregation of the Franciscan Sisters of the Sacred Heart of Jesus would become the school's new operator, allowing it to remain open. The Carmelite Sisters, however, retained ownership of the property.

In September 2015, the institution's closure was announced again, with the Franciscan Sisters citing financial difficulties and the need to renovate the building. As in 2011, demonstrations were held and a parents' committee was formed. The committee met with Mayor Rosângela Mendes. On October 9, 2015, the Catholic Institute of Minas Gerais (ICMG), part of the Brazilian Catholic Education Union (UBEC), which operates the Unileste university center in the city, decided to assume administration of the school. On December 18, however, nearly two months after enrollment for the 2016 school year had begun, the Carmelite congregation informed the parents' committee and the ICMG that it would not agree to a lease allowing the school to continue operating the following year. The closure of Colégio Angélica appeared certain and would have left 64 employees without jobs and forced 360 students, from early childhood education through secondary and technical education, to enroll at other schools. In mid-January 2016, however, the Carmelite congregation and the ICMG reached a new agreement through the mediation of the Diocese of Itabira–Fabriciano. The agreement allowed the ICMG to continue operating the school, and normal activities resumed in early February 2016.

The school ultimately closed permanently at the end of 2022, leaving the building, which was still owned by the Carmelite Sisters, vacant. In May 2026, the building and its surrounding grounds were purchased from the Carmelite Sisters by the Coelho Diniz supermarket chain, which said that it had acquired the property for "investment purposes". On May 30, business owners, former students, former employees, and local residents organized a symbolic embrace around the school as a demonstration calling for the property's preservation and opposing any potential demolition.

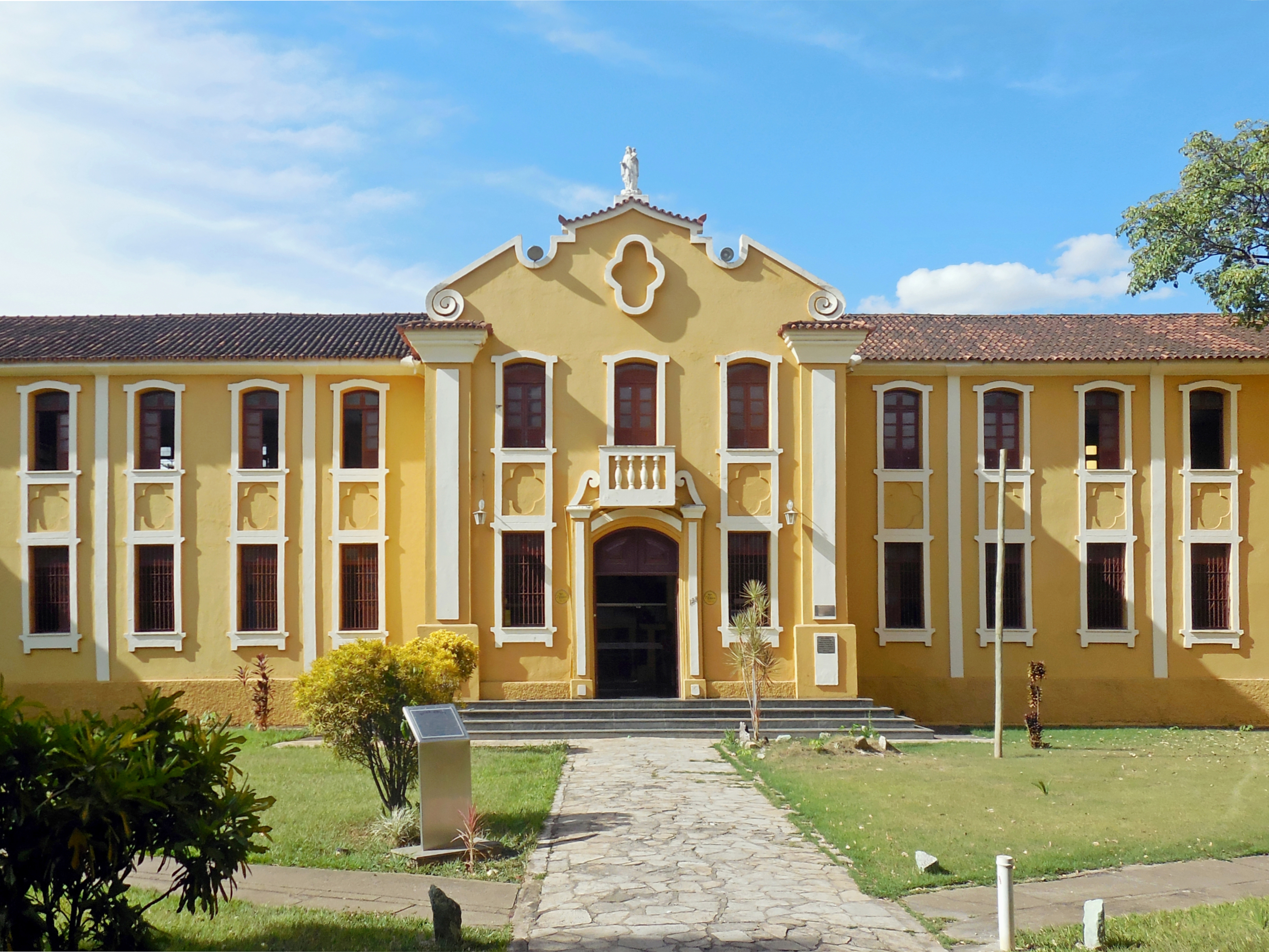
Partial view of the facade.

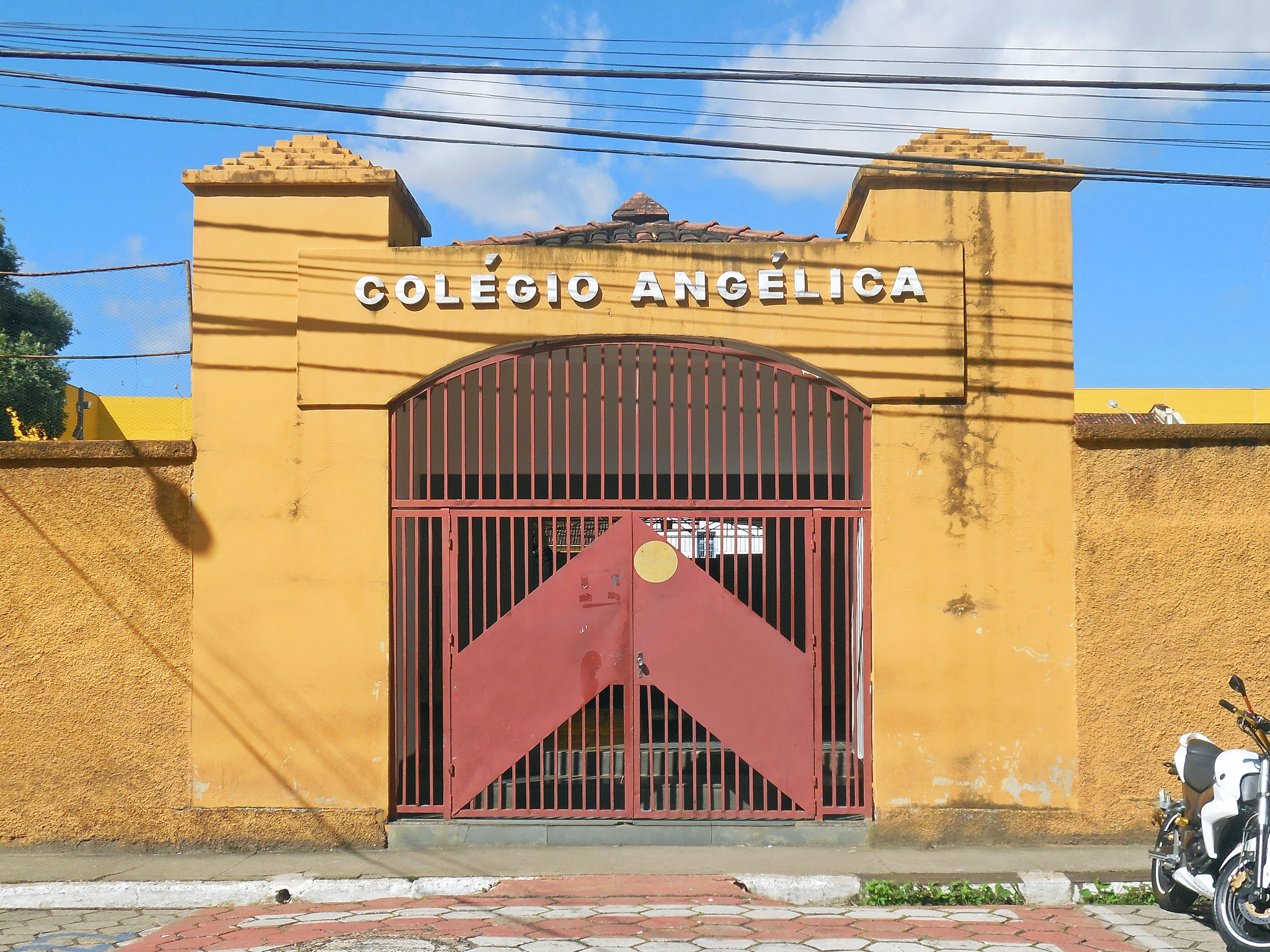
Side entrance, used by students.

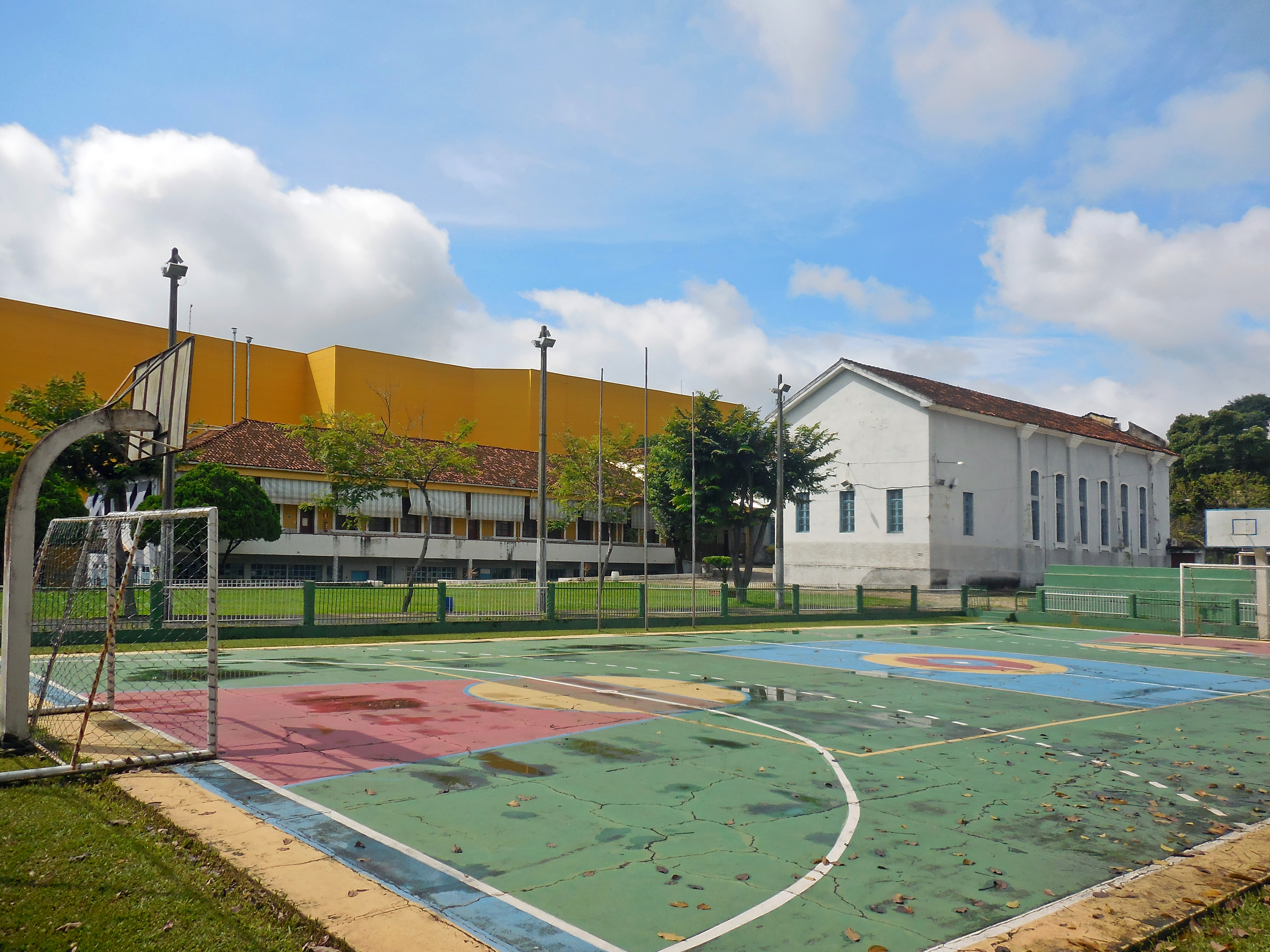
Courts and interior of Colégio Angélica.

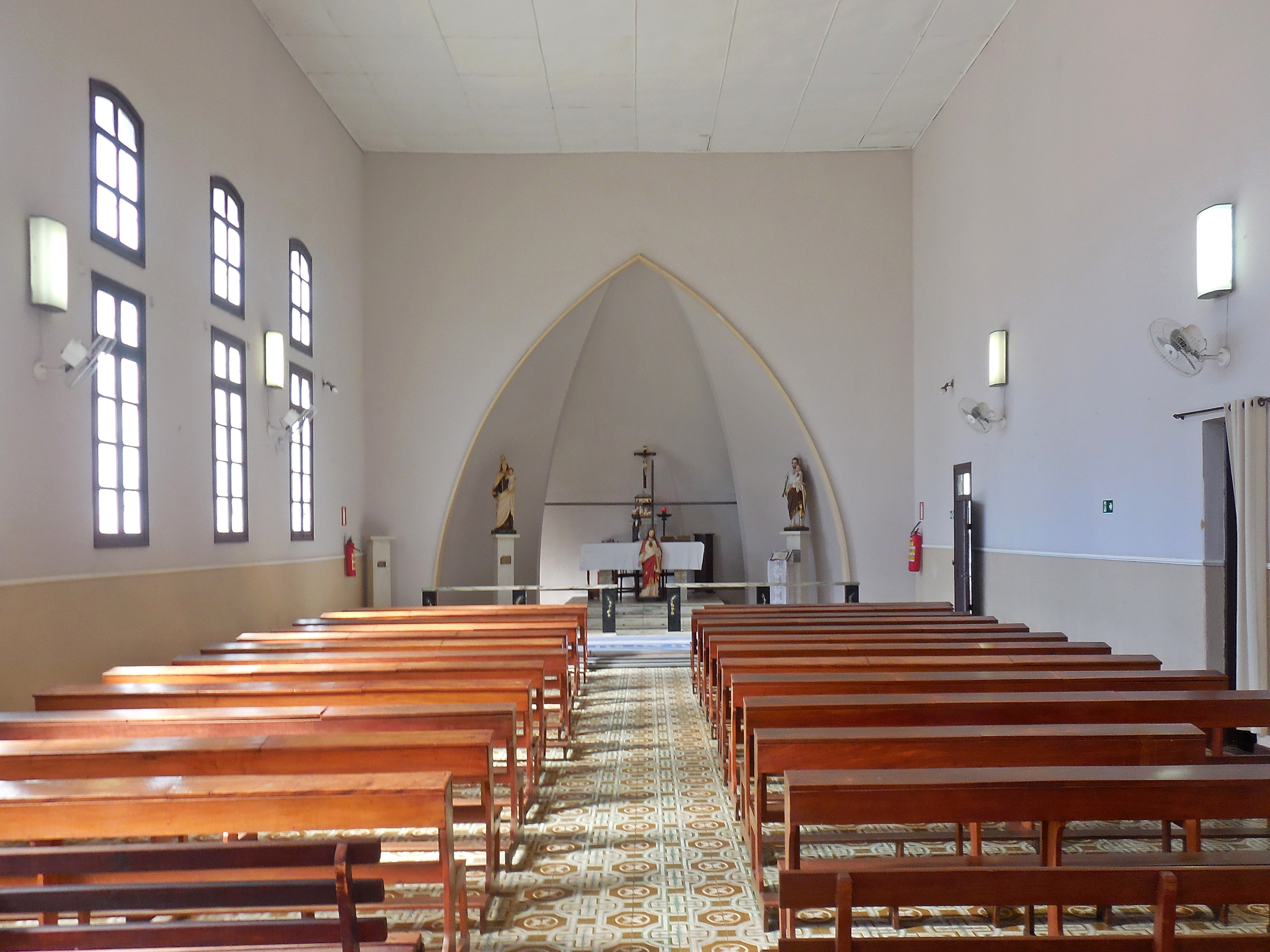
Inside the school chapel.

== Culture and deployment ==
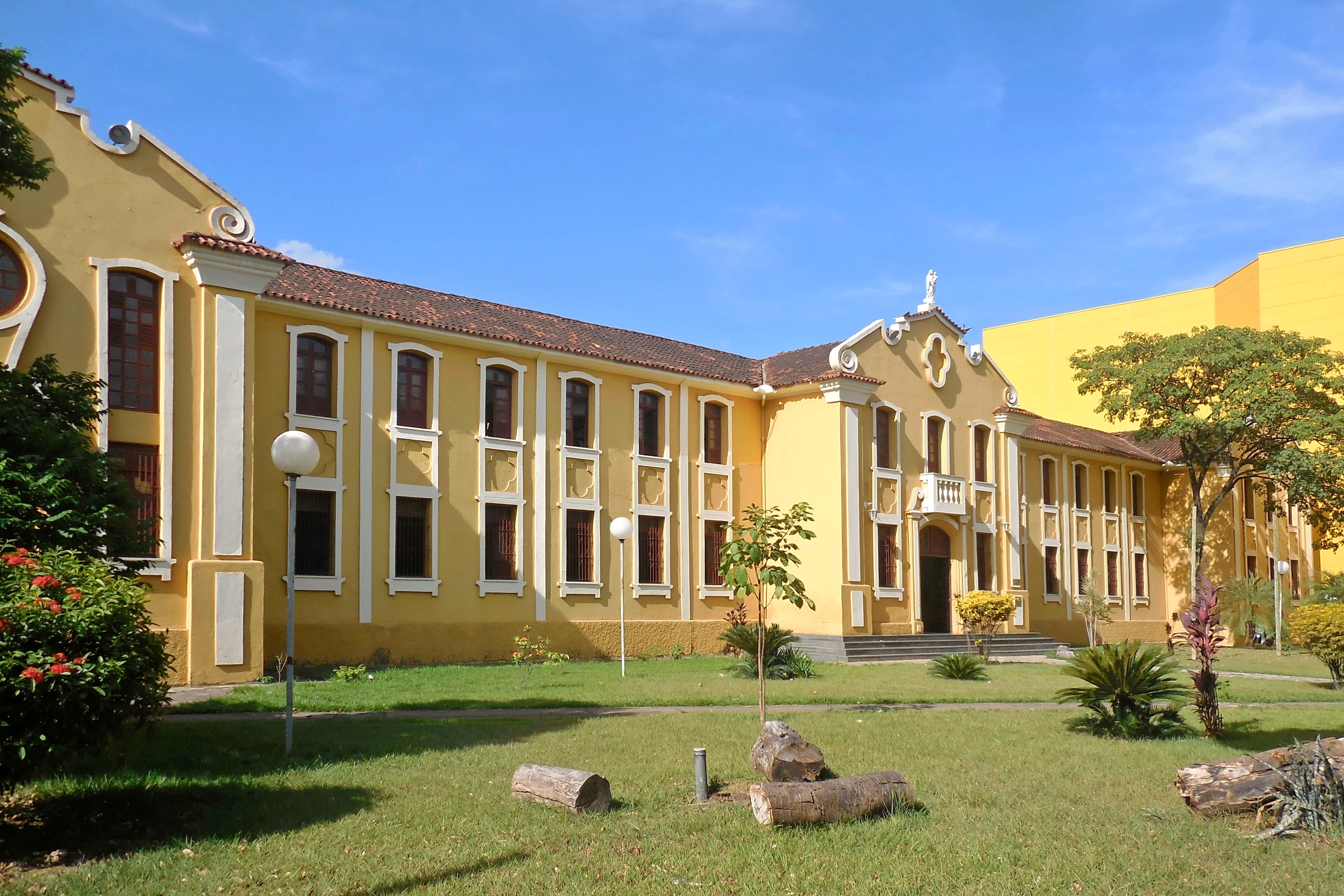
Front of the Colégio Angélica.

Colégio Angélica is located at the corner of the streets Maria Mattos (main entrance) and Angélica (side entrance). Its facade, which still maintains the original design, was declared a cultural heritage site in 1997. The elements of its main facade are repeated symmetrically and the wood-framed windows cover almost all sides. In December 2015, a few days after the announcement of the closure of the institution, Mayor Rosângela Mendes announced the municipal listing of the entire building and the possibility of its listing at the state level after a visit by the State Institute of Historic and Artistic Heritage of Minas Gerais (IEPHA), vetting any changes in its physical structure and removal of physical assets.

The interior of the school houses a chapel, where some of the masses of the Saint Sebastian Parish were held. Until the conclusion of the Saint Sebastian Cathedral, the schoolyard was used for the celebration of the parish masses when there was a larger public expectation, as well as parties, balls, and sports competitions in the city. Two sports courts serve the physical education classes. A series of physical assets inventoried by the municipality are also located inside Colégio Angélica, among which are the images of Our Lady of Mount Carmel, located in the hall and courtyard, and of Saint Joseph in the school hall. Among the events that are held there are the Coronation of Mary, which happens every year in the school's chapel in May, and the June Festival. The name of the neighborhood Nossa Senhora do Carmo, popularly known as Morro do Carmo, pays homage to the Carmelite Sisters, who were responsible for the consolidation of the school.

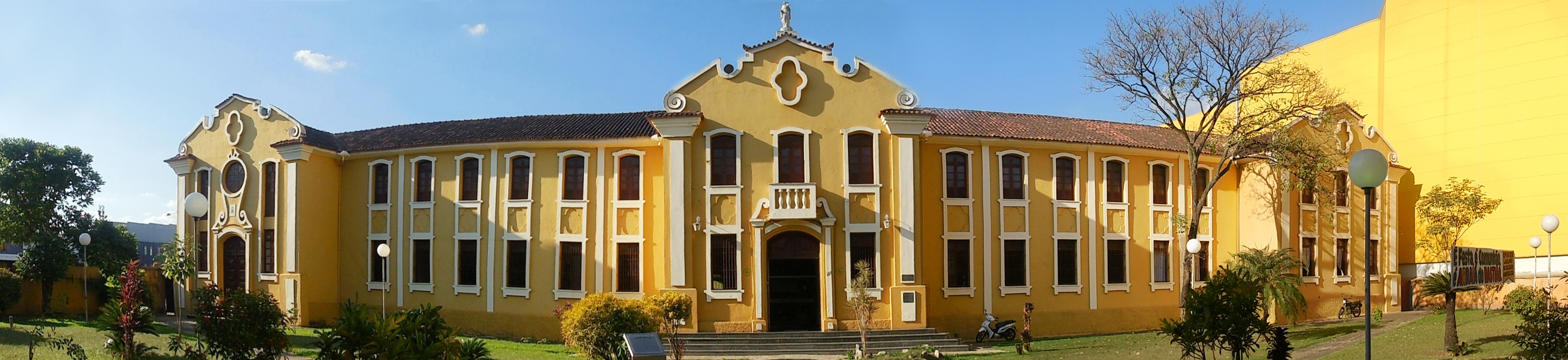
Panoramic view of the facade of Colégio Angélica. The side of the Coelho Diniz Supermarket on the right.
