= Coronel Fabriciano =

- Municipality
- The Municipality of Coronel Fabriciano
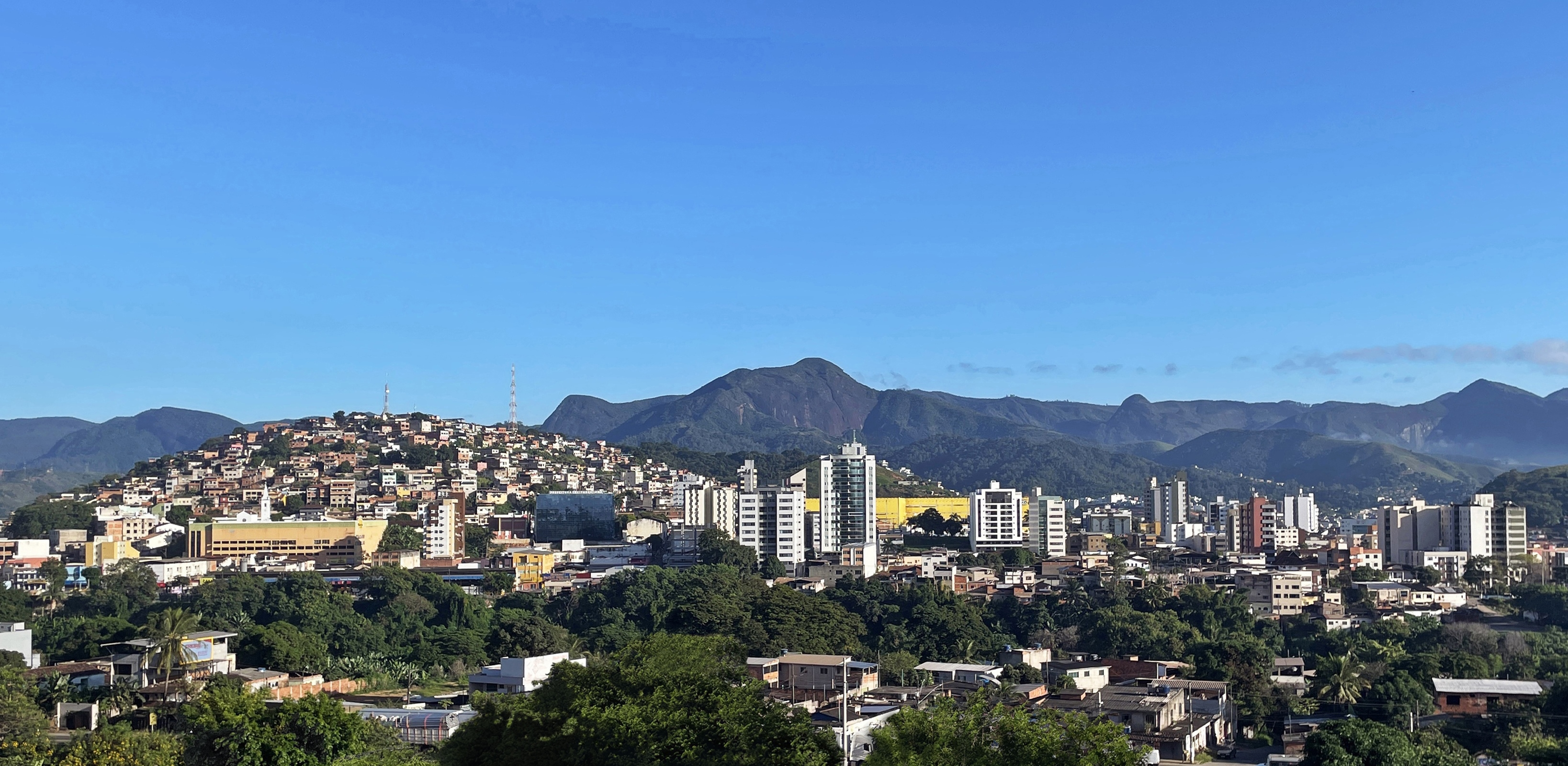
- Partial view of Coronel Fabriciano seen from Timóteo

- Flag Coat of arms
- Nicknames: "Fabri" "Fabriciano" "Terra mãe do Vale do Aço"
- Motto: Deus, Pax Et Prosperitas, Deus, Paz e Prosperidade; God, Peace and Prosperity

- Location in Brazil
- Coordinates: 19°31′08″S 42°37′44″W
- Country: Brazil
- Region: Southeast
- State: Minas Gerais
- Founded: January 20, 1949

Government
  - Mayor: Marcos Vinícius da Silva Bizarro (PSDB)

Area
  - Total: 221.252 km^{2} (85.426 sq mi)
- Elevation: 250 m (820 ft)

Population (2022 Census)
  - Total: 104,736
  - Estimate (2025): 108,708
  - Density: 498.5/km^{2} (1,291/sq mi)
- IBGE
- Demonym: Fabricianense
- Time zone: UTC-3 (UTC-3)
- Postal Code: 35170-000
- HDI (2010): 0.755 – high
- Website: www.fabriciano.mg.gov.br

Coronel Fabriciano is a municipality in the state of Minas Gerais in the Southeast region of Brazil. It is located in the region of Vale do Rio Doce and is situated 200 km from the state capital. The municipal population was estimated in 2022 Census by IBGE in 104,736 inhabitants. The area is 221.252 km^{2} (85.426 sq mi) (13.1549 km^{2} (5.0791 sq mi) of urban area).

The municipality was emancipated from Antônio Dias in 1948 and its name is a tribute to Lieutenant colonel Fabriciano Felisberto Carvalho de Brito. The town was situated in the Vale do Aço (Steel Valley) metropolitan area, between the largest steel industries of Minas Gerais state; Usiminas, in Ipatinga, and the Aperam South America, in Timóteo. These industries were situated in Fabriciano at they time they were constructed, and were essential to the development of the city. However, these facilities are located within the area of Ipatinga and Timóteo respectively, which were emancipated from Coronel Fabricano, and incorporated proper in 1964.

Coronel Fabriciano is located in the Serra dos Cocais, home of many natural attractions of the city like the "Pedra Dois Irmãos" (Two Brothers stone), the "Pedra do Caladão" (Silent stone), the "Cachoeira do Escorregador" (slide waterfalls), the "Trilhas da Mamucha" (Mamucha trails), and other waterfalls and trails. Outdoor sports are popular such as hiking, trekking, mountain biking, parachute jumping, and 4x4 offroading. The city also features historical monuments like the "Catedral de São Sebastião" (Saint Sebastian Cathedral), the "Colégio Angélica" (Angélica College) and the "Monumento Terra Mãe" (motherland monument).

The Human Development Index (HDI) is 0.755, classified as high by the United Nations Development Programme (UNDP).

== History ==
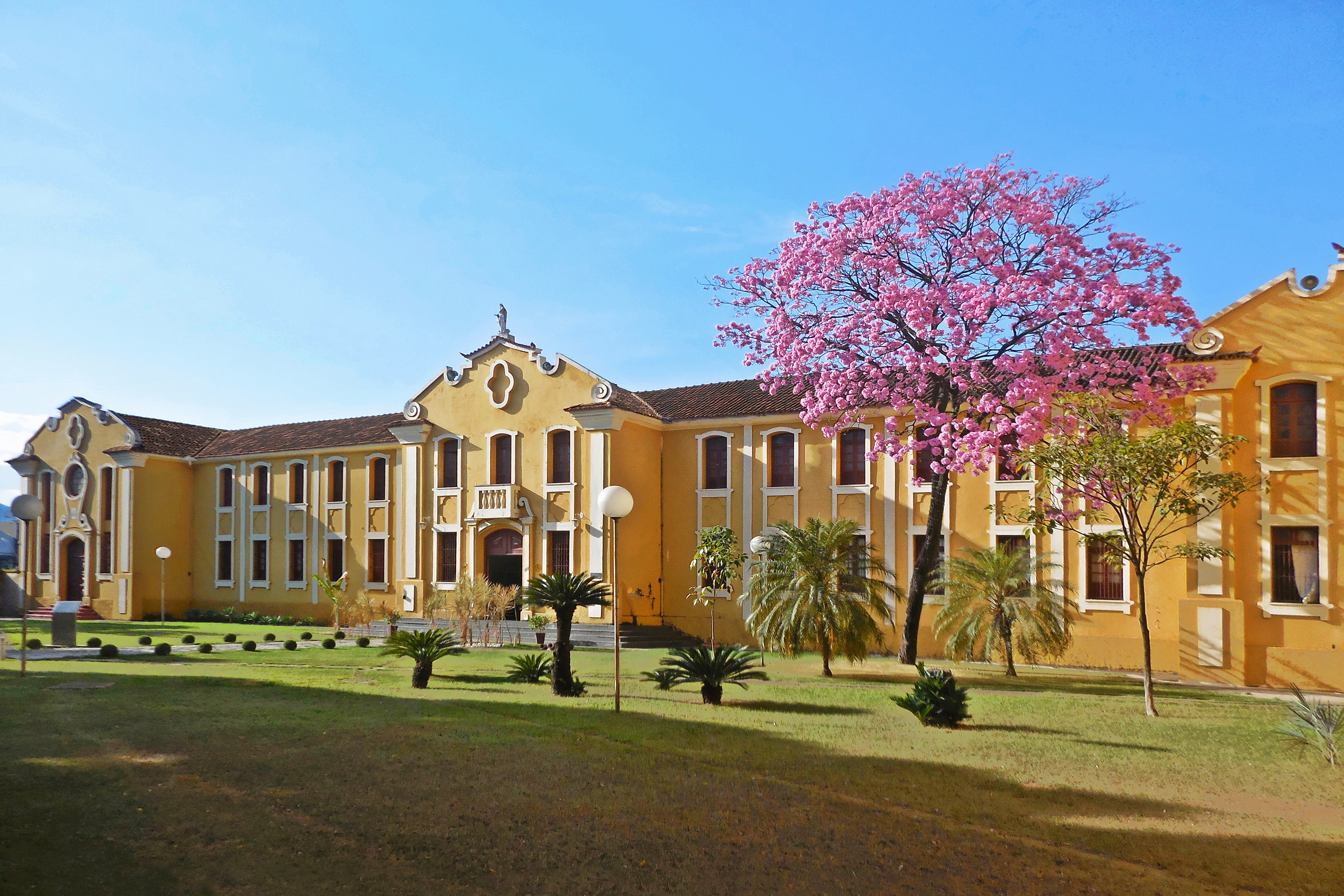
Colégio Angélica, a school founded in 1950.

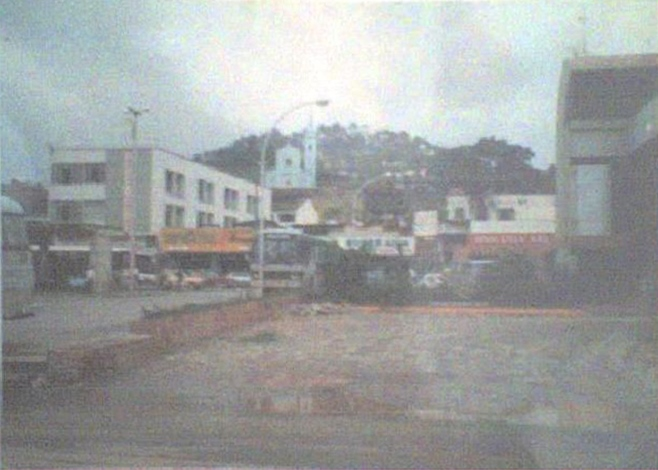
Downtown in 1991

With the inauguration of the Calado Station, they began to be lifted up the first homes, very poor and basic. Only in 1928 was built, with the exception of the train station, the first house covered with ceramic and floored.

By the Law State no. 843, of November 17 of 1926, the district was created, settling the May 7 of 1927 in the then patrimony of Santo Antônio, that passed to Melo Viana to be called, having been named his/her first peace judge the citizen Manoel Camilo of Fonseca, that gave ownership to his/her first peace clerk, Mr. João the Baptist Pereira. The first registrations civil facts were: the twins' baptism Duraci of Distaneta, daughters of the couple Antônio Viana and the marriage of the Sírio Maron Abibi with Geralda Honrata of Souza. On March 1 of 1930, it was accomplished in the new district the first election

The first name of the place when virgin forest, was Barra, for finding located in the confluence of the Caladão Stream, starting to denominate Calado (Quiet), with the inauguration of the Rail Station. Almost time, Raul Soares was denominated, returning the Calado (Quiet) name again. In August 1938, it was baptized with Coronel Fabriciano Fabriciano name, in honor to colonel Fabriciano Felisberto of I Break, for occasion of his/her centennial from birth. Ten years later, the municipal district was created being dismembered of Antônio Dias.

On December 27 of 1948, after a long process gone through the procedure in the Legislative Assembly of the State, governor Milton Campos signs the Law no. 336, creating the municipal district of Coronel Fabriciano. The official installation felt in the day January 1 of 1949, in session presided by the peace judge José Anastácio Franco. It assumed as manager Dr. Antônio Gonçalves Gravatá, with the different objective of to organize the municipal administration and to give him/it to the official mayor, elect for the population. It is like this, the March 15 of 1949, they take ownership then the mayor Dr. Rubem Siqueira Maia, vice-mayor Colonel Silvino Pereira, aldermen Nicanor Ataíde, Lauro Pereira, Ary Barros, José Anatólio Barbosa, Wenceslau Martins Araújo, Sebastião Mendes Araújo, José Paula Viana, Raimundo Martins Fraga and José Wilson Camargo.

In spite of the emancipation and December 27 of 1948, an agreement was signed with the local parish, in which the birthday of the city is commemorated on January 20, day of the patron of the city, São Sebastião.

== Geography ==
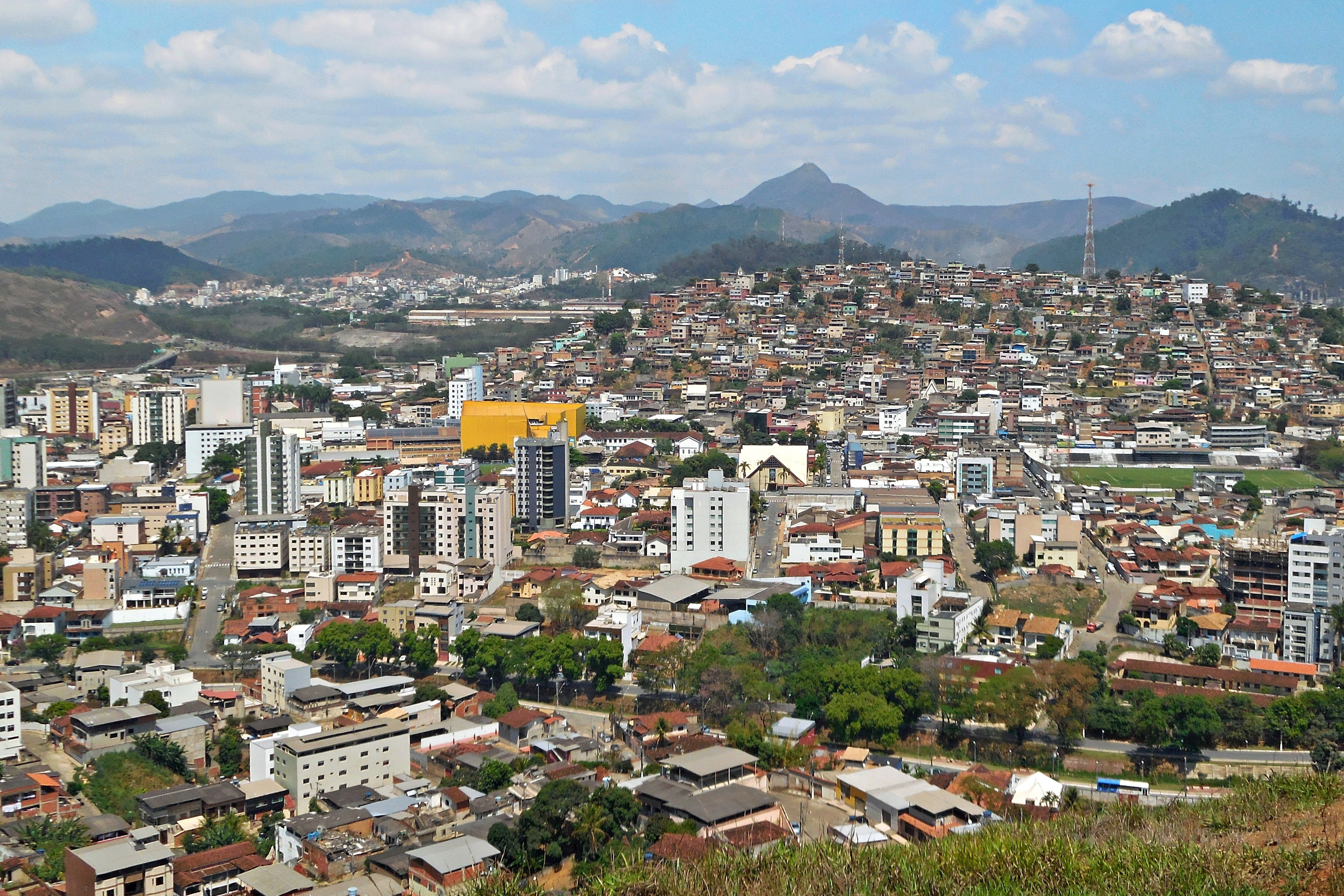
Downtown area

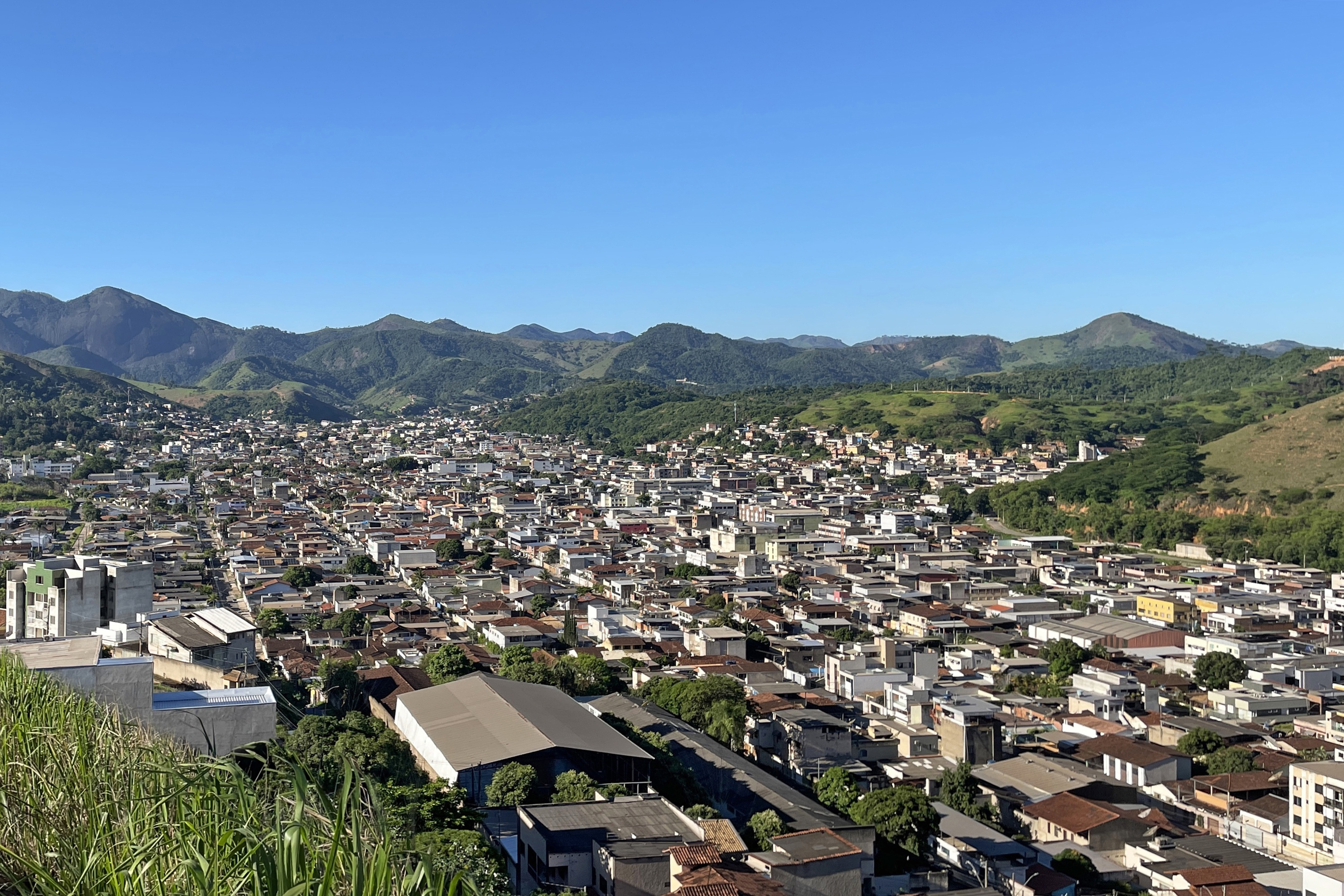
Senador Melo Viana district's area

São José dos Cocais, in the Serra dos Cocais, municipal countryside.

=== Statistics ===
- Elevation: 240 m
- Climate: Sub-tropical
- Average annual temperature: 22 °C
- Latitude South 19°31'07"
- Longitude West: 42°37'44

=== Subdivisions ===
==== Main streets and avenues ====
Most of the city's main avenues (Avenidas) and streets (Ruas) are named after important people. Some of them are in blue below, linked to their Wikipedia article.

- Avenida Julita Pires Bretas
- Avenida José de Magalhães Pinto
- Avenida Geraldo Inácio
- Avenida Tancredo de Almeida Neves
- Avenida Rubens Siqueira Maia
- Rua Maria Matos
- Rua Pedro Nolasco
- Rua Moacir Birro
- Rua Marechal Floriano
- Rua São Sebastião
- Rua Argemiro José Ribeiro
- Rua Padre Américo Magalhães

==== Districts ====
- Senador Melo Viana
- Coronel Fabriciano (sede)

=== Distances from other cities (KM) ===
- Belo Horizonte: 198
- Rio de Janeiro: 560
- São Paulo: 765
- Vitória: 420
- Brasília: 936
- Ipatinga: 13
- Timóteo: 6
- Governador Valadares: 118
- Sete Lagoas: 273

=== Climate ===
Climate data for Coronel Fabriciano (1981–2010)
Month	Jan	Feb	Mar	Apr	May	Jun	Jul	Aug	Sep	Oct	Nov	Dec	Year
Mean daily maximum °C (°F)	32.3 (90.1)	33.0 (91.4)	32.3 (90.1)	31.0 (87.8)	29.0 (84.2)	27.9 (82.2)	28.1 (82.6)	28.6 (83.5)	29.6 (85.3)	30.1 (86.2)	30.9 (87.6)	31.2 (88.2)	30.3 (86.5)
Daily mean °C (°F)	25.3 (77.5)	25.5 (77.9)	25.0 (77.0)	23.5 (74.3)	21.4 (70.5)	19.5 (67.1)	19.1 (66.4)	19.9 (67.8)	22.0 (71.6)	23.3 (73.9)	24.2 (75.6)	24.7 (76.5)	22.8 (73.0)
Mean daily minimum °C (°F)	20.6 (69.1)	20.5 (68.9)	20.1 (68.2)	18.5 (65.3)	16.2 (61.2)	14.1 (57.4)	13.1 (55.6)	13.9 (57.0)	16.4 (61.5)	18.6 (65.5)	19.4 (66.9)	20.2 (68.4)	17.6 (63.7)
Average precipitation mm (inches)	239.8 (9.44)	137.1 (5.40)	162.5 (6.40)	66.6 (2.62)	40.6 (1.60)	15.2 (0.60)	7.4 (0.29)	18.1 (0.71)	48.7 (1.92)	108.0 (4.25)	258.1 (10.16)	312.8 (12.31)	1,414.9 (55.70)
Average precipitation days (≥ 1.0 mm)	13	8	10	6	5	3	2	2	5	8	14	16	92
Average relative humidity (%)	80.0	77.8	79.8	81.1	82.2	82.4	79.2	76.3	74.5	75.5	79.9	81.3	79.2
Source: Instituto Nacional de Meteorologia

== Economy ==
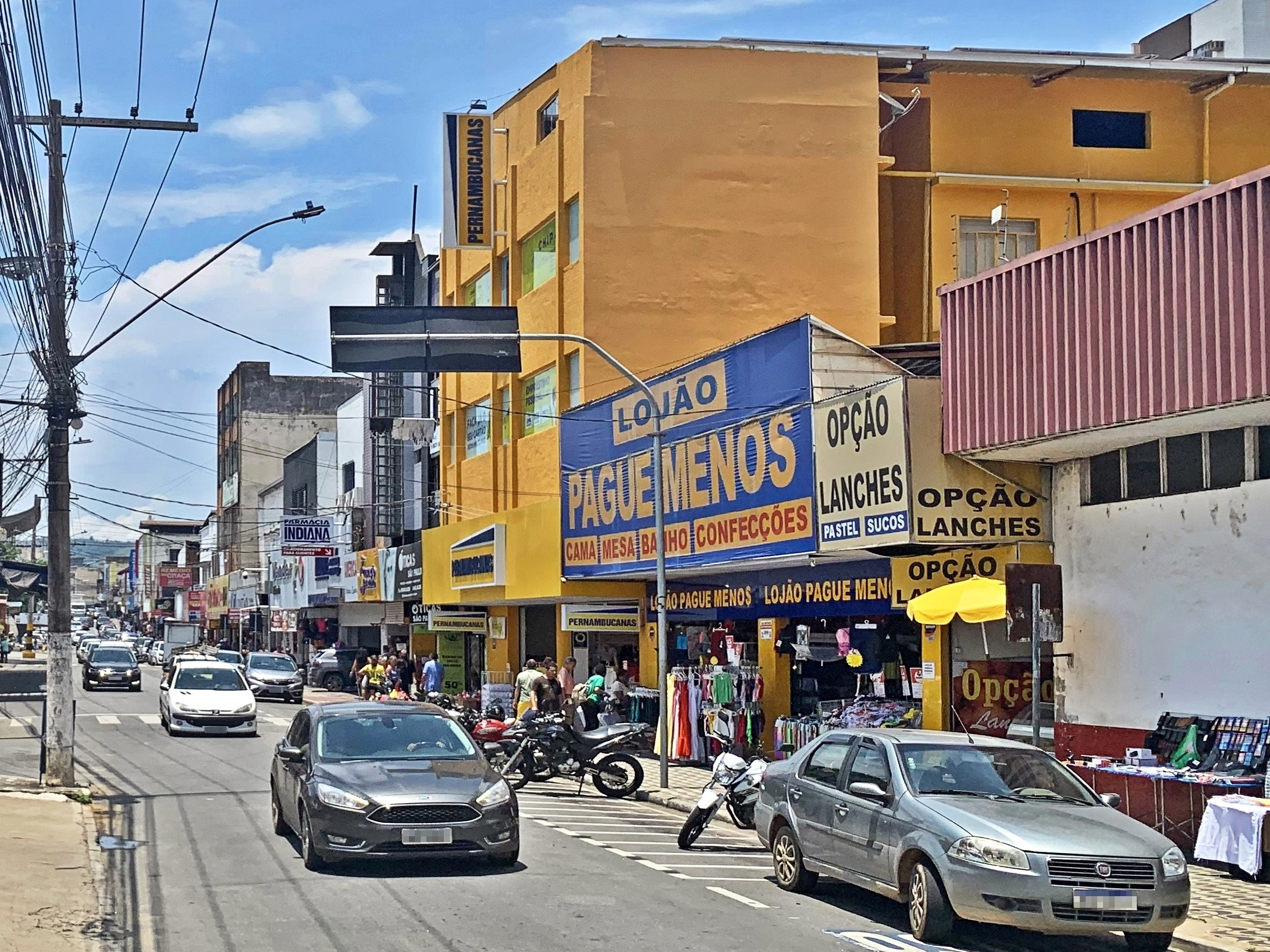
Commerce in the Pedro Nolasco Street

The city is between Ipatinga and Timóteo, that base the largest and more modern siderurgic industries of Minas Gerais: Usiminas and Arcelor Mittal Timóteo, respectively. Coronel Fabriciano, those cities and several others, are in the Metropolitan Area of Vale do Aço, where Fabriciano is the second largest city, and has the third GDP.

Trading, services, eucalyptus monoculture, small and medium industries are the main activities in Coronel Fabriciano.

=== Commercial ===
According to official statistics of the city hall (http://www.fabriciano.mg.gov.br), the commercial activities include 3.561 registered establishments, of the most varied branches. The section of services involves 3.275 names registered, with prominence for the branch of Hostelry: there are about 1.800 accommodations, and 400 of them are framed in the categories "three" or "four stars."

=== Agriculture ===
Eucalyptus, from rural areas, is used by Cenibra, a Brazilian-Japanese cellulose factory in Belo Oriente. It is also used by local charcoal factories.

=== Industry ===
Several factories are based in the city, many of then in the Industrial District.

== Sports ==
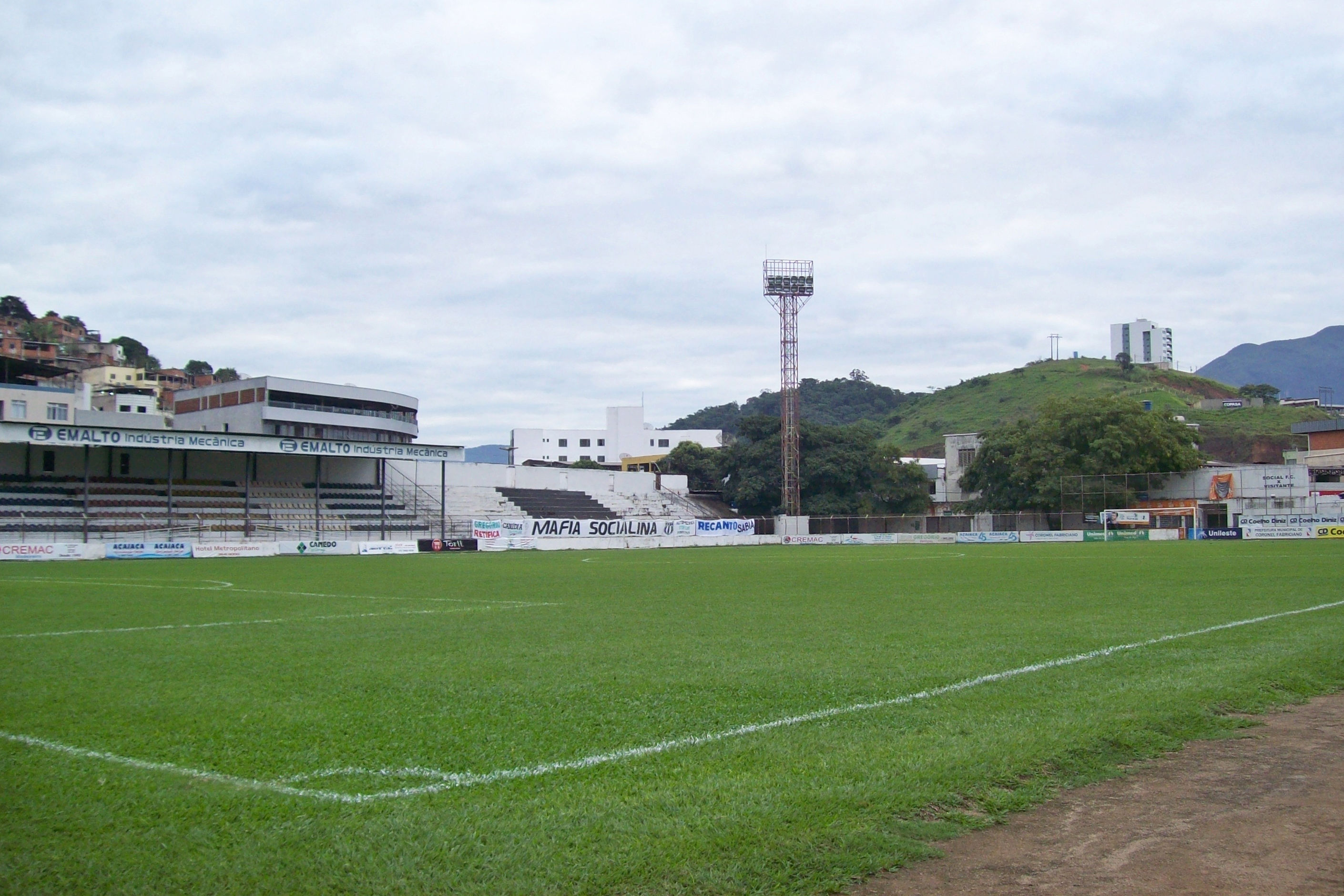
Estádio Louis Ensch

=== Extreme ===
The mountains of Serra dos Cocais in Fabriciano is usually used for extreme sports. Motorcycles and bikes are often used. But it's also common to make slow rides by foot or by horse in these calm mountains and see the waterfalls.

=== Auto racing ===
The city's Jeep Club, Jipe Clube Vale do Aço, often organize jeep travels and competitions. In 2008, Fabriciano hosted the 3rd race of the state's 4x4 Regularity rally Championship.

=== Football ===
The city main professional football club is Social that plays the state's first division

== Gallery ==
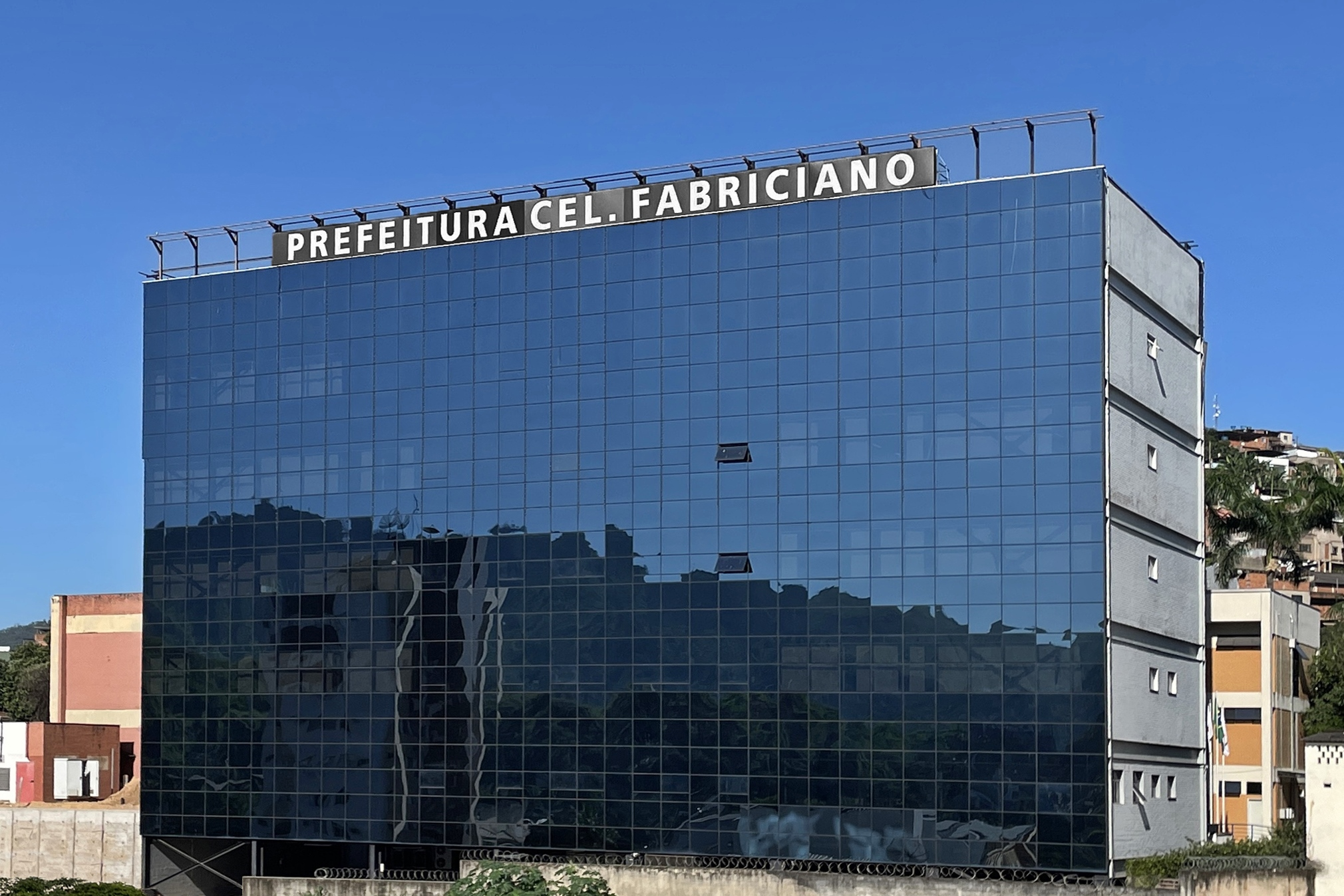
City Hall

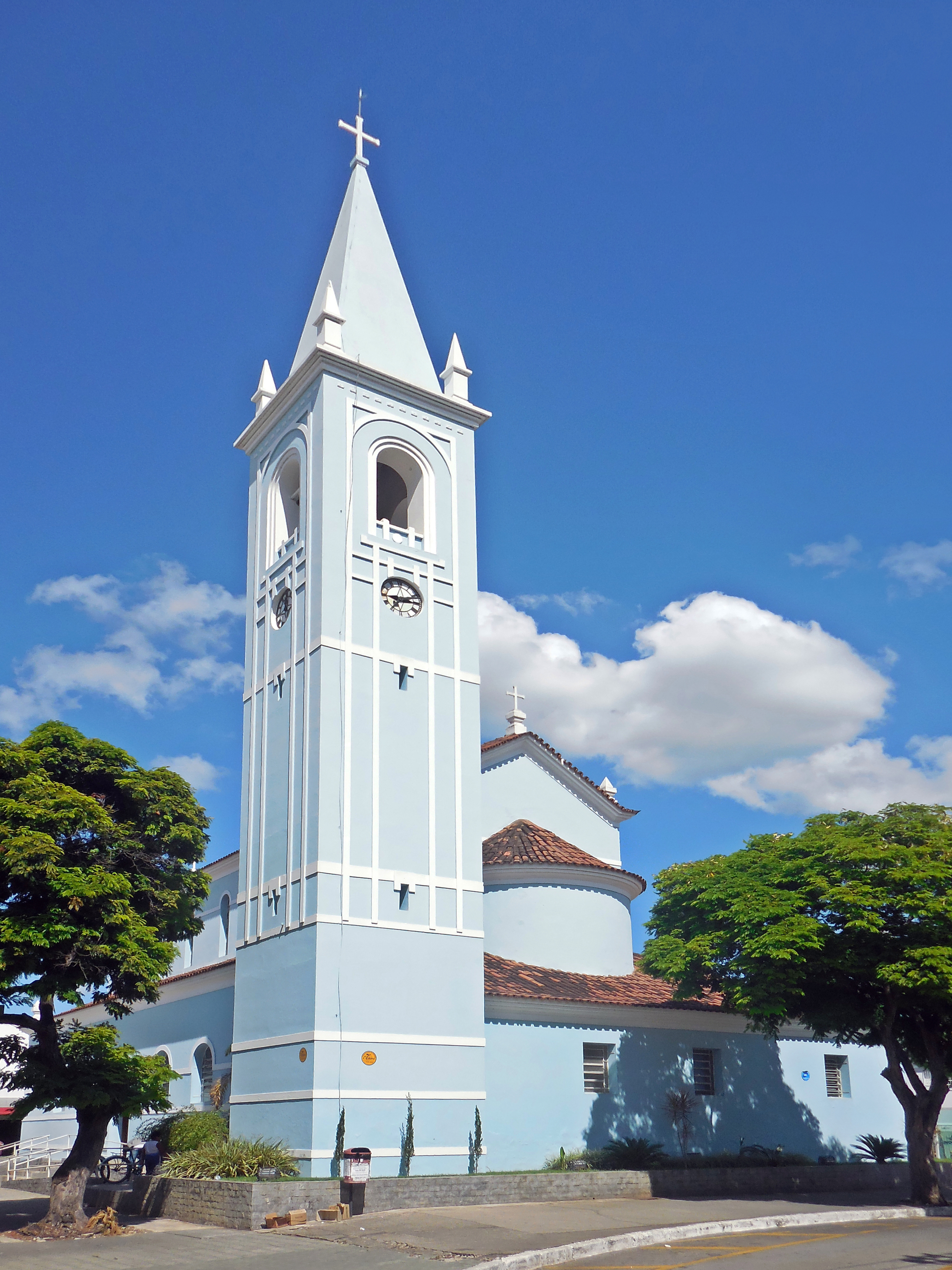
Saint Sebastian Parish Church (1949)

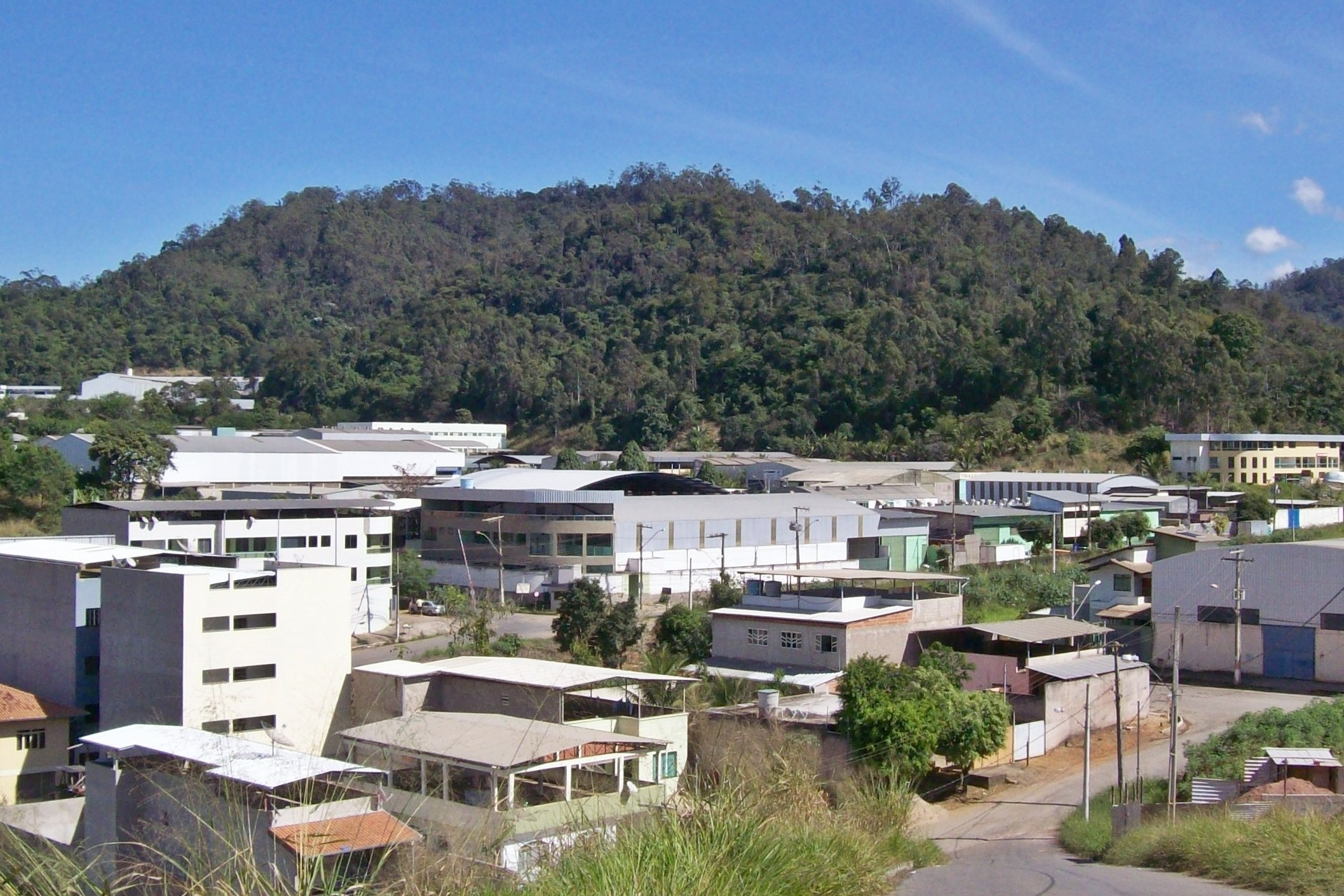
Industrial District

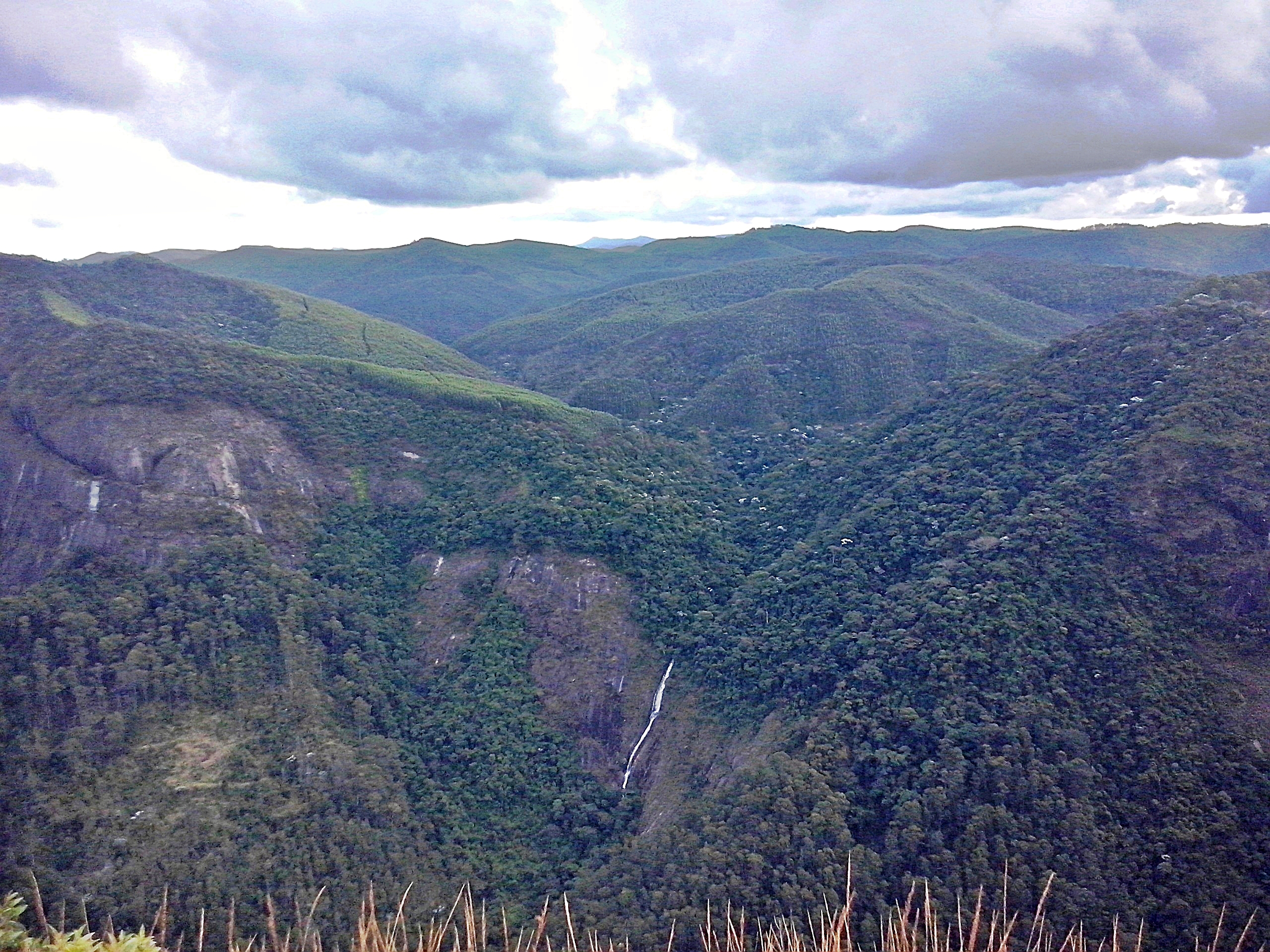
Hills of the Serra dos Cocais

== See also ==
- List of municipalities in Minas Gerais
- Rubem Siqueira Maia
- Saint Sebastian Cathedral
- Saint Sebastian Parish
- Catholic University Center of Eastern Minas Gerais (Unileste)
