= Antônio Dias =

Brazilian municipality

Coordinates: 19°39′10″S 42°52′19″W

- Municipality
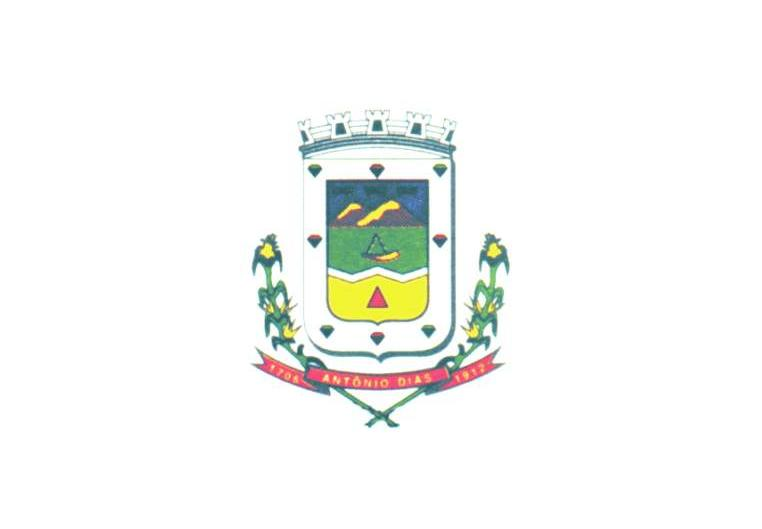
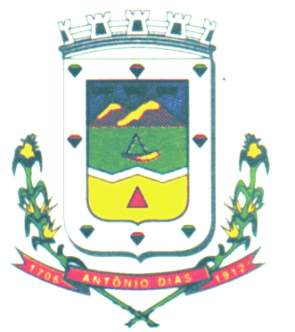
- Flag Coat of arms
- Interactive map of Antônio Dias
- Country: Brazil
- State: Minas Gerais
- Region: Southeast

Population (2022 Census)
  - Total: 9,219
  - Estimate (2025): 9,375
- Time zone: UTC−3 (BRT)

Location of Antônio Dias within Minas Gerais

Antônio Dias is a Brazilian municipality located in the state of Minas Gerais. Its population as of 2025 is estimated to be 9,375 people living in a total area of 787.061 km^{2} (303.886 sq mi). The city belongs to the mesoregion of Vale do Rio Doce and to the microregion of Ipatinga.

== See also ==
- List of municipalities in Minas Gerais
- Rubem Siqueira Maia
