= Saint Sebastian Cathedral, Coronel Fabriciano =

Catholic religious temple in Brazil

Saint Sebastian Cathedral
- Catedral de São Sebastião
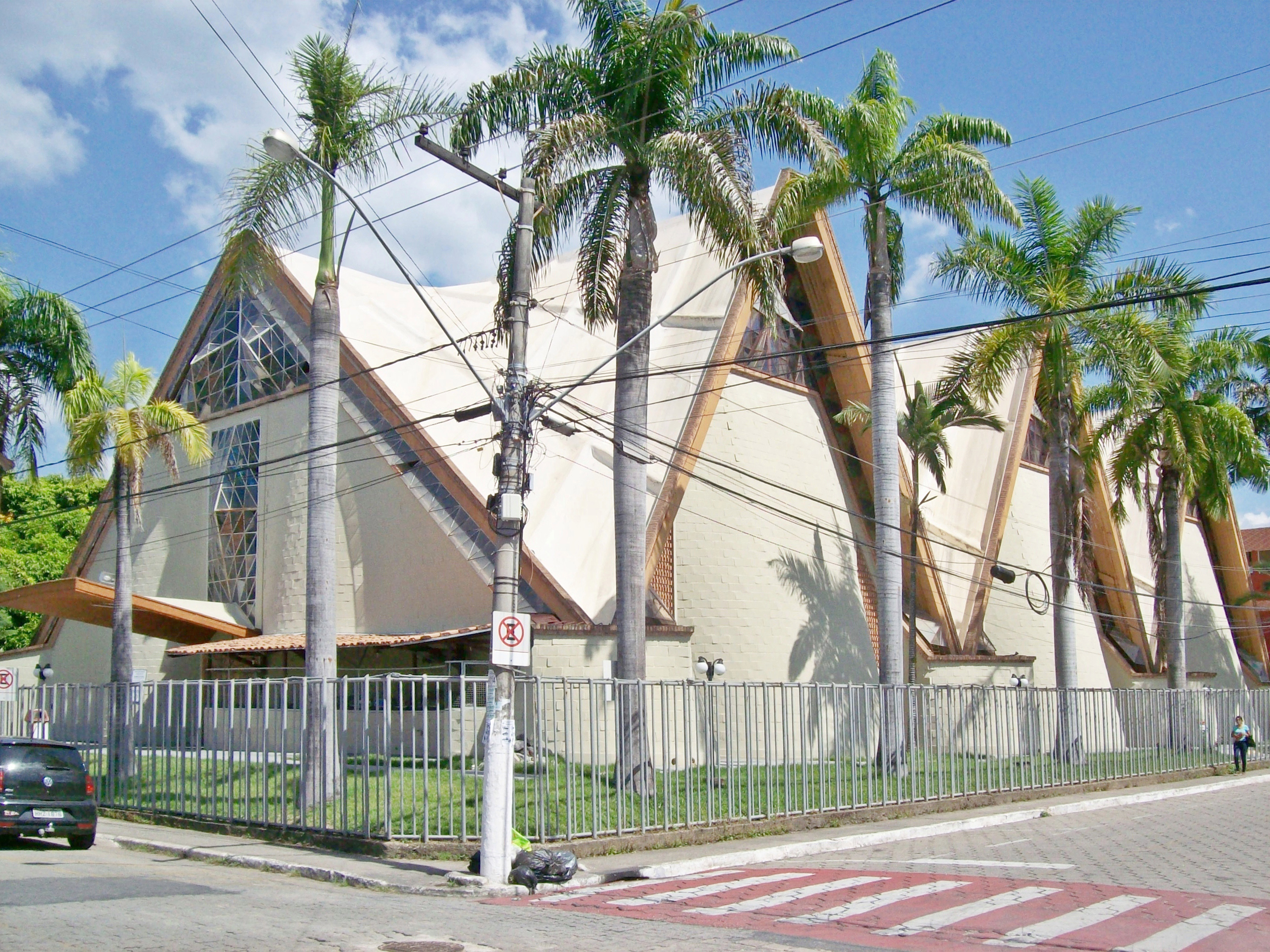
- Facade and side of the Saint Sebastian Cathedral, 2015

- Location of the Cathedral

Religion
- Affiliation: Catholic
- Ownership: Roman Catholic Diocese of Itabira–Fabriciano

Location
- Municipality: Coronel Fabriciano
- State: Minas Gerais
- Country: Brazil
- Interactive map of Saint Sebastian Cathedral
- Coordinates: 19°31′26.4″S 42°37′29.2″W

Architecture
- Architect: Ronei Lombardi Filgueiras
- Style: Contemporary architecture
- Completed: 1993

Website
- https://dioceseitabira.org.br/

The Saint Sebastian Cathedral is a Catholic religious temple located in the Brazilian city of Coronel Fabriciano, in the interior of the state of Minas Gerais. It was inaugurated in 1993 and since then shares the title of seat of the Diocese of Itabira-Fabriciano with the Our Lady of the Rosary Cathedral, which also represents the Episcopal See, in Itabira.

It was built as an alternative to the crowds at the city's Parish Church, due to the growing number of people attending the activities of the Saint Sebastian Parish. Its architecture, in contemporary style, was inspired by the Tokyo Cathedral which, in turn, was based on the tents that served as mobile sanctuaries in the desert described in the biblical passage from Exodus (26:14).

The temple holds assets such as a miniature of the Calado Station, a large sculpture of Saint Sebastian, and a pipe organ that was acquired by Dom Lélis Lara and listed as a municipal cultural heritage site. It is one of Coronel Fabriciano's main attractions and can hold 1200 people.

== History ==
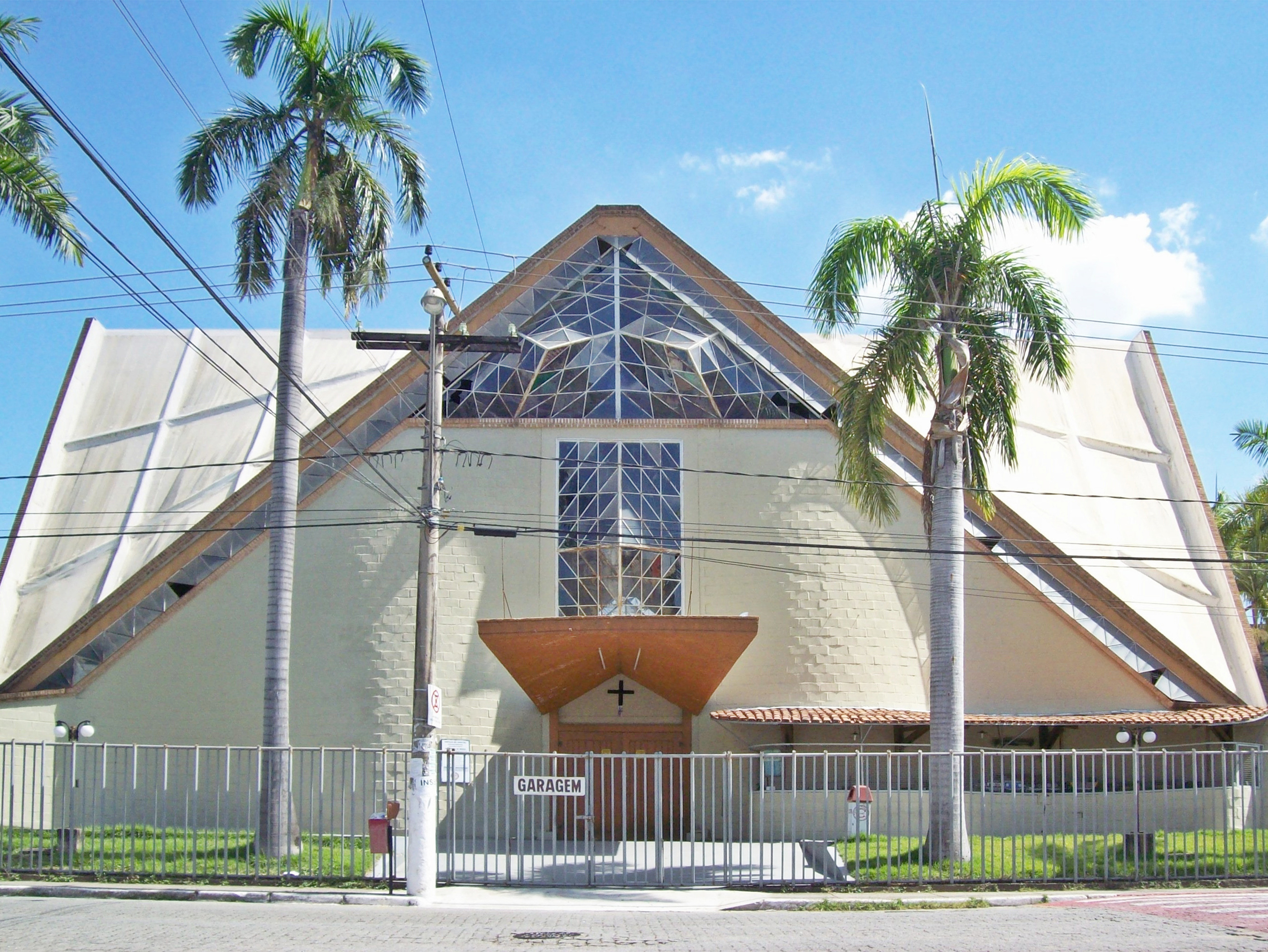
Facade of the Saint Sebastian Cathedral.

The construction of the Saint Sebastian co-cathedral was already speculated due to the overcrowding of the Saint Sebastian Parish Church, inaugurated in 1949, as a result of the growing number of people attending the activities of the Saint Sebastian Parish. In 1974, the religious celebrations that were expected to have a larger public began to be held in the Dom Lélis Lara Parish Hall (formerly the São José Parish Hall), located in front of the Parish Church.

In 1979, Coronel Fabriciano was declared as one of the seats of the Diocese of Itabira, which became the Diocese of Itabira-Fabriciano; with this, the function of co-cathedral was assigned to the Parish Church of Coronel Fabriciano, also known as the Parish Church of Saint Sebastian. However, the campaign for the construction of a larger temple was started in February 1987. The architectonic project was conceived by the architect Ronei Lombardi Filgueiras, and the work was led by the parish priest at the time, Father Élio da Silva Athyde. On the morning of January 20, 1988, the cornerstone was laid, after a solemn mass and procession from the Parish Church. During the works a series of activities and events, such as stalls, musical shows, dances and competitions, were held in order to raise the necessary profit.

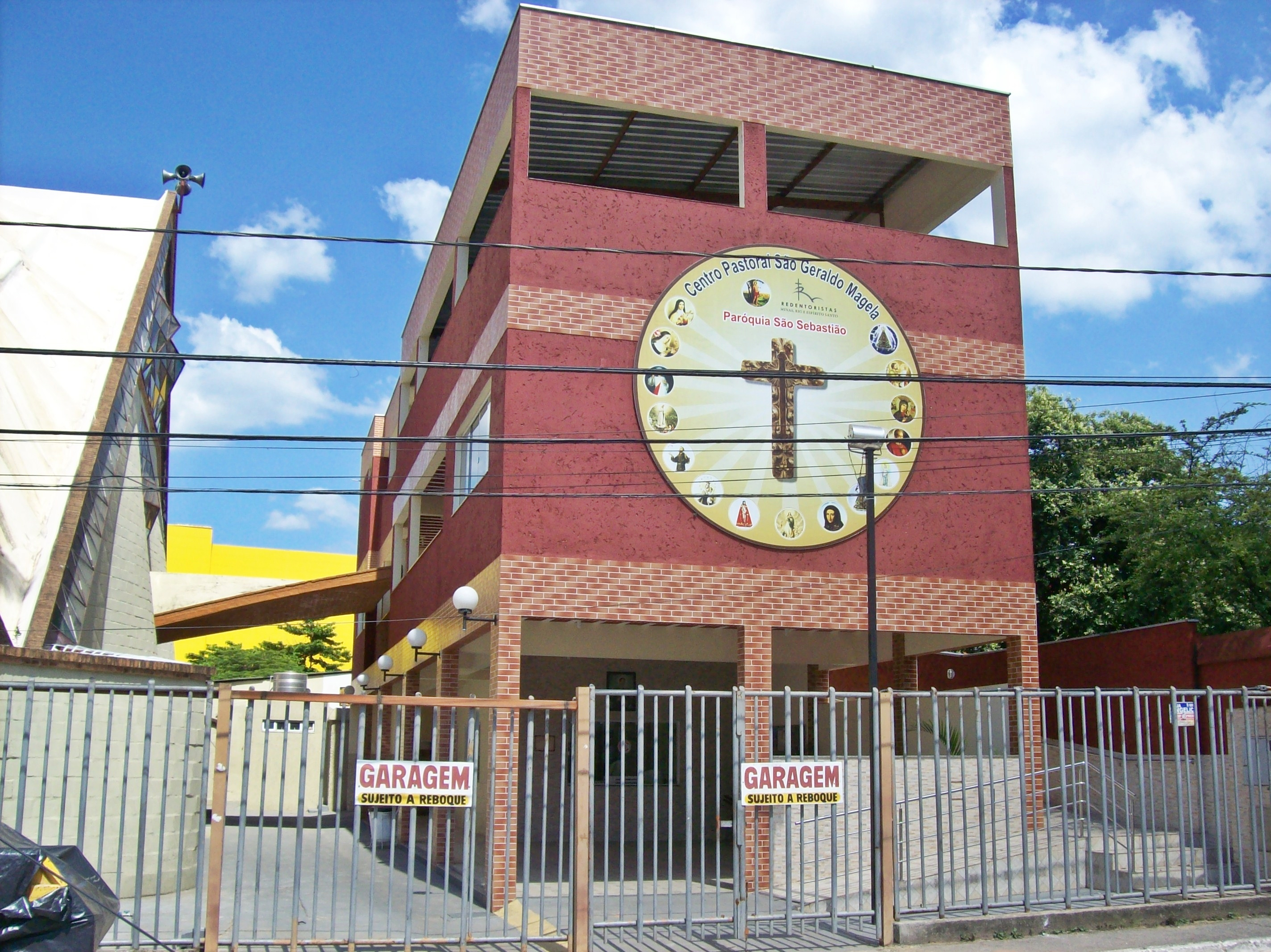
Saint Gerard Majella pastoral center, opened in 2013.

The temple was built on land donated by the Congregation of the Carmelite Sisters of Divine Providence that belonged to Colégio Angélica (English: Angélica college). The three modules that make up the roof were built with steel donated by Usiminas. Still in the late 1980s, the parish acquired all 1,300 chairs of the old Cine Marrocos, bought and then donated by the faithful themselves after the closing of the movie theater.

The inauguration and consecration of the cathedral took place on July 4, 1993, in a ceremony attended by 38 religious. After its inauguration, the new temple became the co-cathedral of the Diocese of Itabira-Fabriciano. In 2006, the Chrism Mass, with the blessing of the holy oils on Holy Thursday, was held for the first time in the building. The celebration of the diocese, which until then took place only in Itabira, is now alternated between the cities; one year it is held in Coronel Fabriciano and the next in Itabira.

On the night of May 12, 2022, part of the cathedral roof collapsed. At the time of the accident there was no one inside the building, which had to be closed by the Civil Defense.

== Implementation and Collection ==
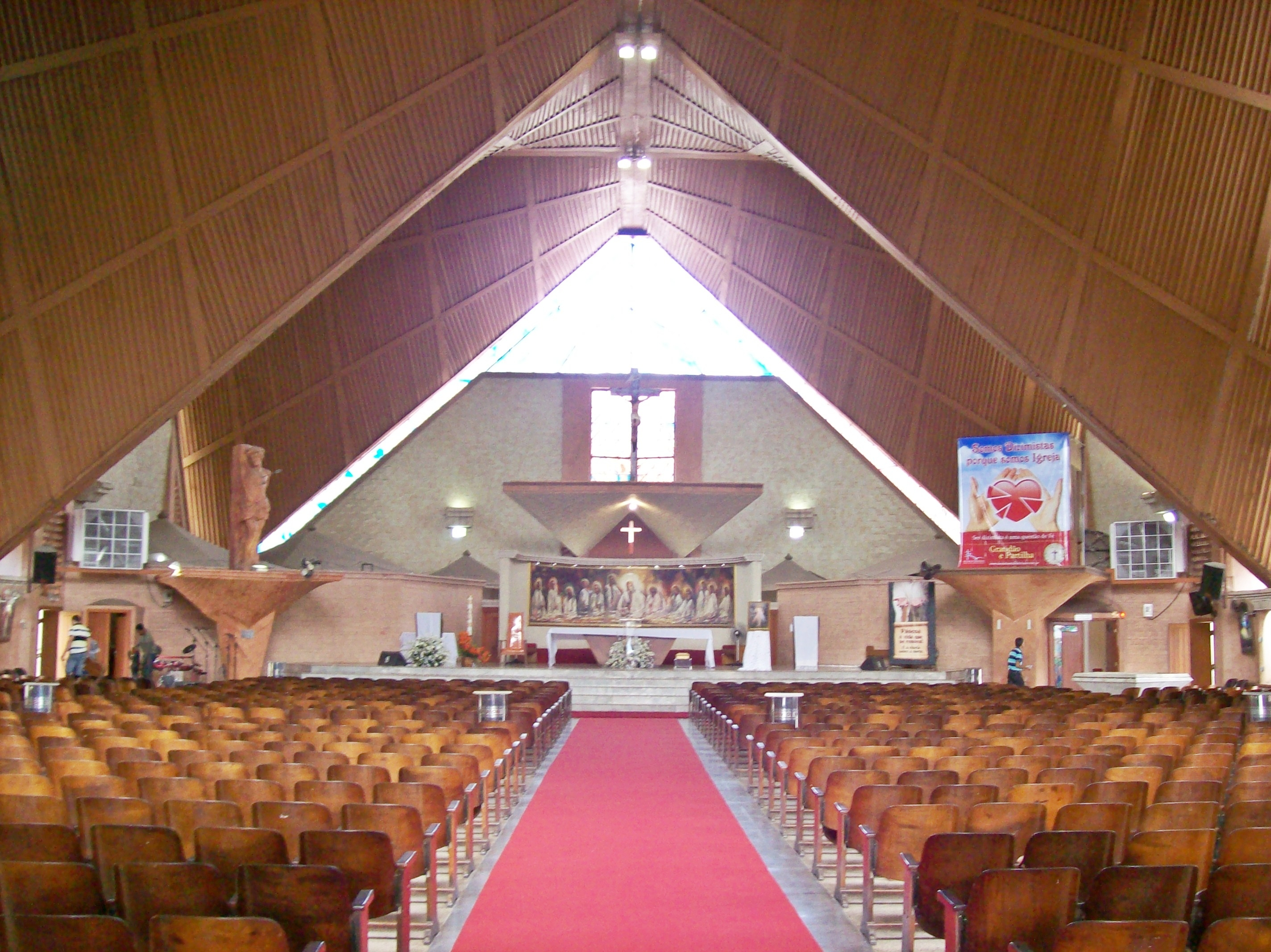
Interior of the Saint Sebastian Cathedral.

The temple's architecture, in contemporary style, was inspired by the Tokyo Cathedral which was based on the tents that served as mobile sanctuaries in the desert described in the biblical passage from Exodus (26:14). Its structure is made of structural masonry in concrete blocks and its main facade, facing east to São Sebastião Street, in the Santa Helena neighborhood, has the similar shape of an isosceles triangle, whose side edges do not reach the ground. The side facades, in turn, are composed of three isosceles triangles. The colored stained glass windows located between the iron columns and the roof are also striking features, representing biblical passages at the ends of each of the triangles.

There is an ornamental garden outside with shrubs, imperial palms, and grass lining, and near the main entrance there is a miniature Calado Station. In front of the church there is also a fountain. Inside the temple, the pipe organ acquired by Dom Lélis Lara in the 1970s, from the Presbyterian Church in the town of Lavras, and the sculpture of the Saint Sebastian donated by José Avelino Barbosa in 1992, after being bought directly from the sculptor Léo Santana - known for sculpting the statue of Carlos Drummond de Andrade sitting on the Copacabana beachfront in Rio de Janeiro - stand out. José Avelino's father, the merchant Rotildino Avelino, donated the patron saint images to the city's first church, in 1929, and to the current Parish Church, in 1949. The interior of the cathedral still houses the Blessed Sacrament Chapel, which was reinaugurated in 2015, and a memorial to Dom Lélis Lara, who died in 2016.

== Culture ==
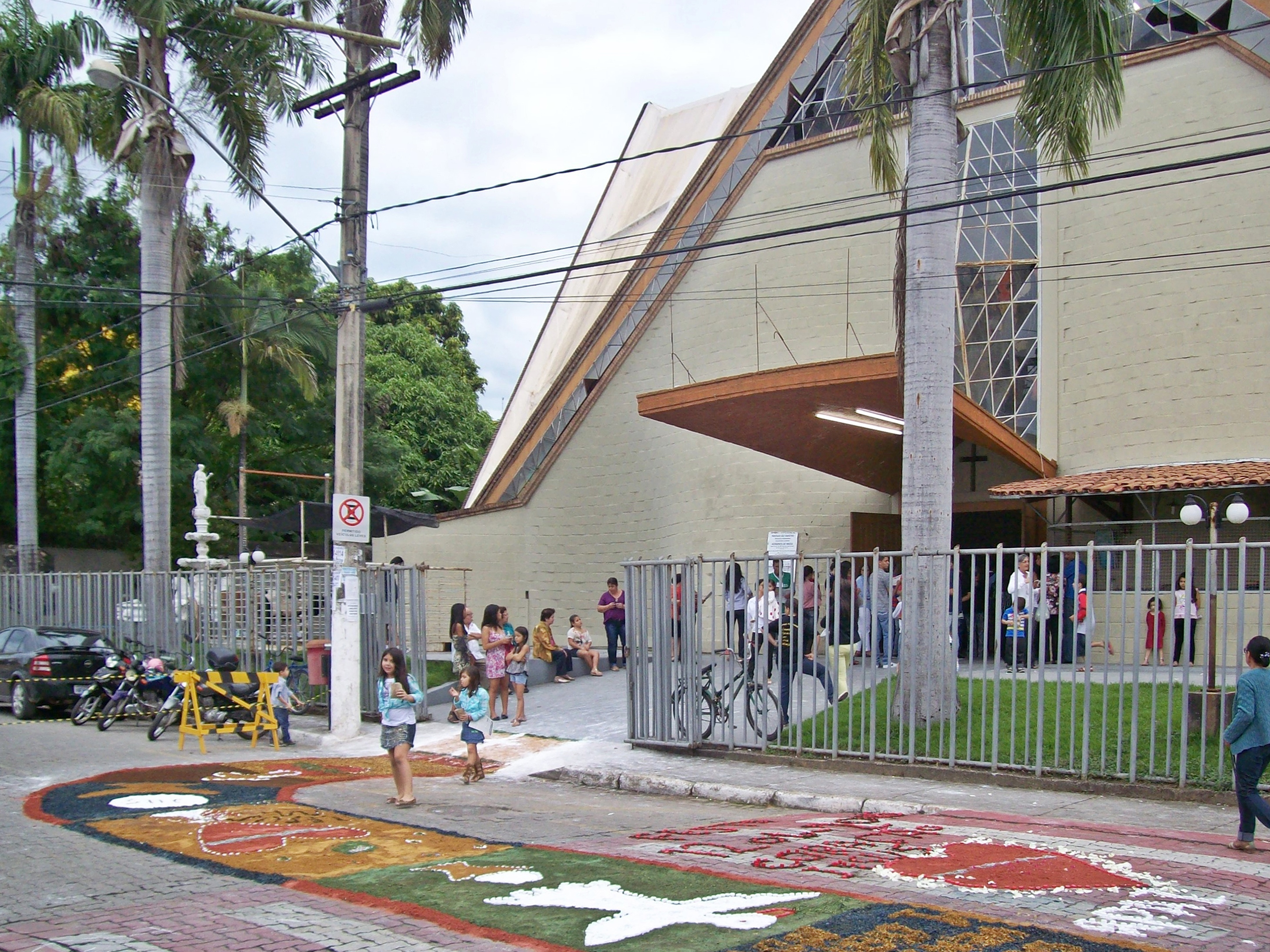
Corpus Christi carpet in front of the cathedral.

The inauguration of the temple in 1993 consolidated its consecration as a diocesan co-cathedral, replacing the city's Parish Church. Therefore, the cathedral began to share the title of seat of the Diocese of Itabira-Fabriciano from 1979, together with the Our Lady of the Rosary Cathedral, which also represents the Episcopal See, in Itabira. Since its creation, in August 1948, the Saint Sebastian Parish has been directed by the Congregation of the Redemptorist Missionaries.

The construction of the co-cathedral centralized the city's religious activities, also maintaining the organization of weddings and weekly masses. The celebrations and events related to the feasts of Saint Sebastian, Ash Wednesday, Holy Week, the Coronation of Mary, and the Misa de Gallo of the Saint Sebastian Parish are now held around the cathedral.

Until the 1990s, the route of the Corpus Christi carpet began in the Parish Church, went to Pedro Nolasco Street and returned to the temple. After the conclusion of the new temple, the route was transferred to the streets of the Santa Helena and Professores neighborhoods. The pipe organ located inside the cathedral and the Corpus Christi procession are considered cultural heritage of Coronel Fabriciano.

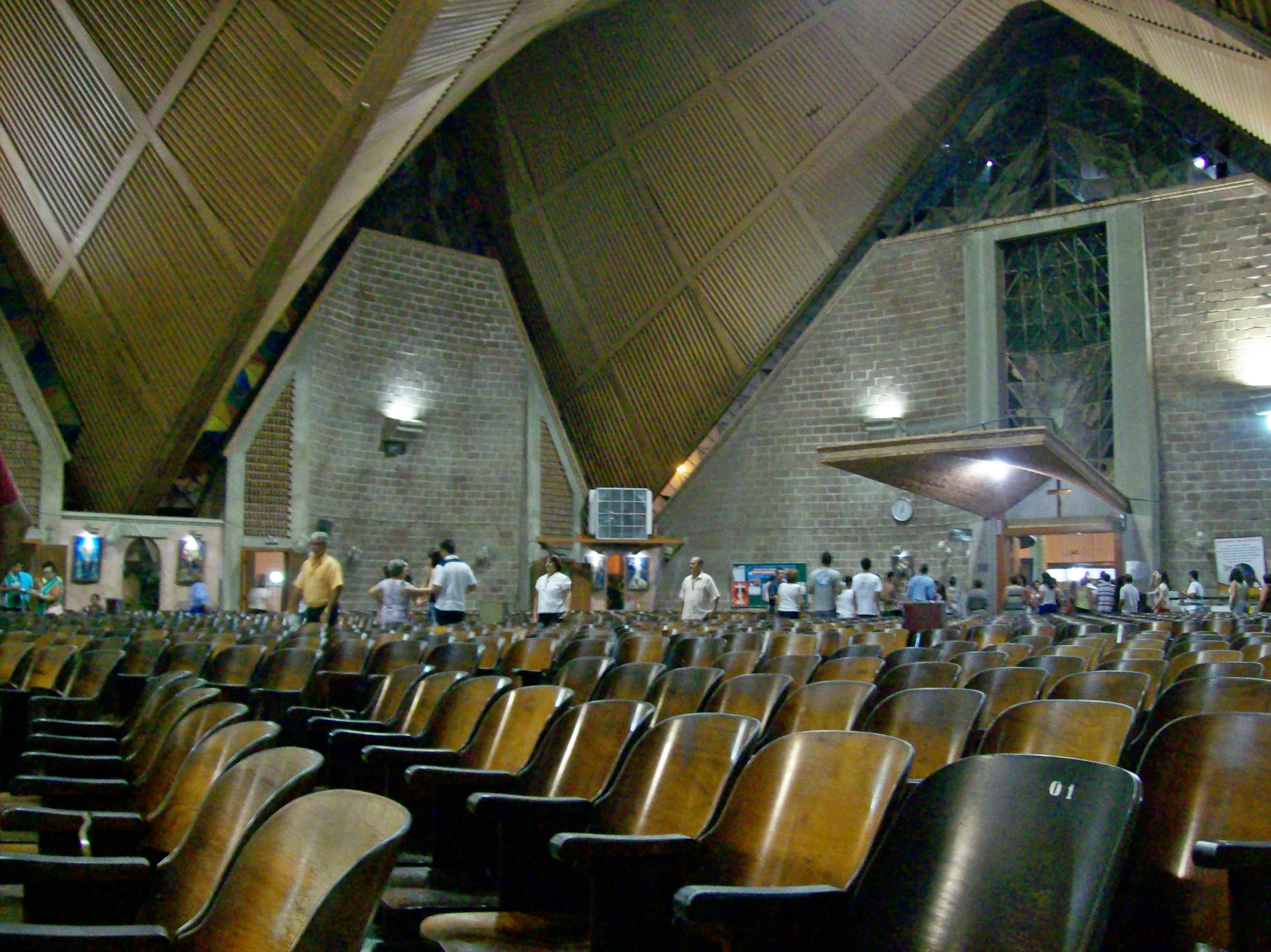
Night view from inside the temple.

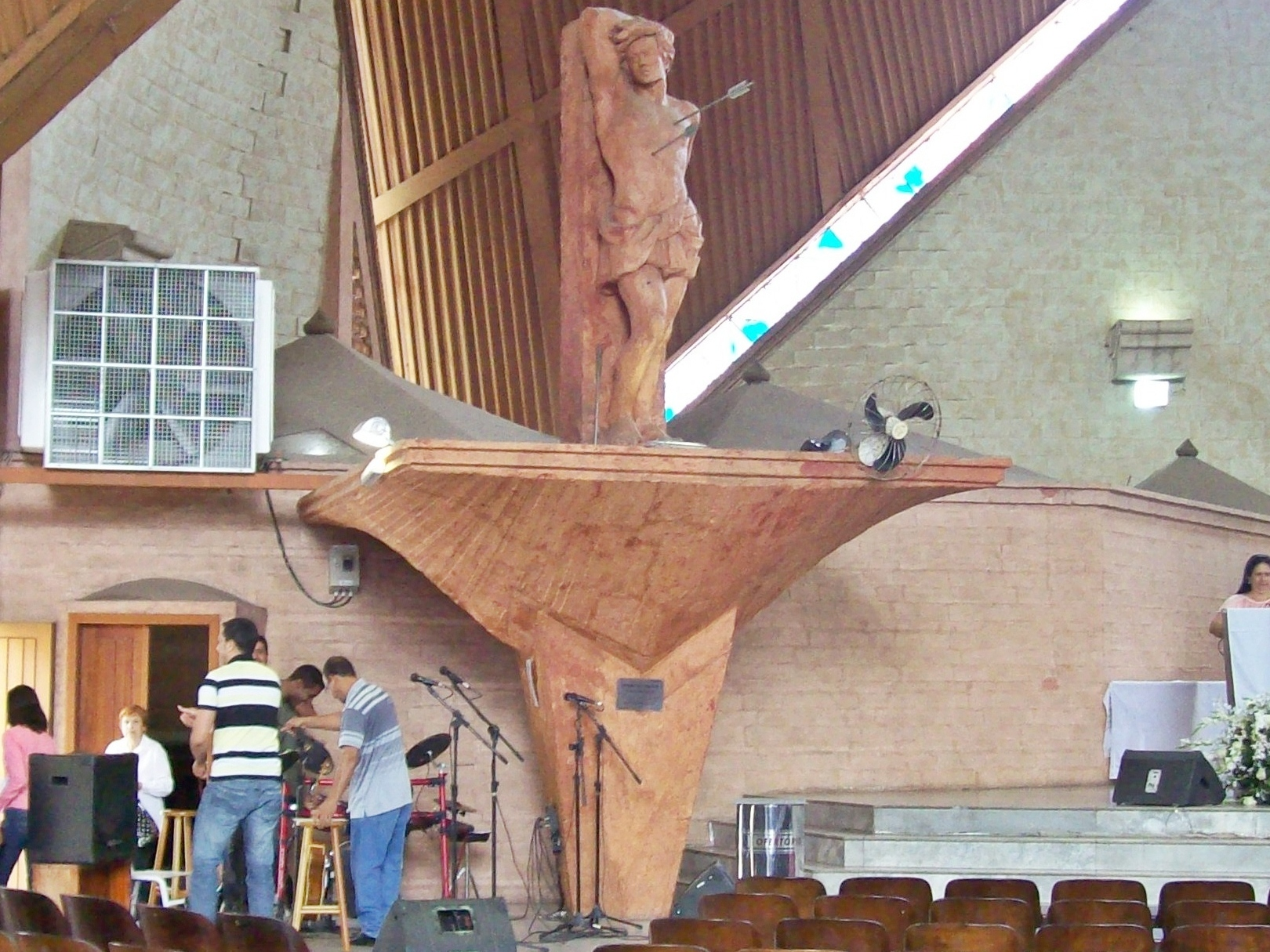
Sculpture of Saint Sebastian donated by José Avelino Barbosa in 1992.

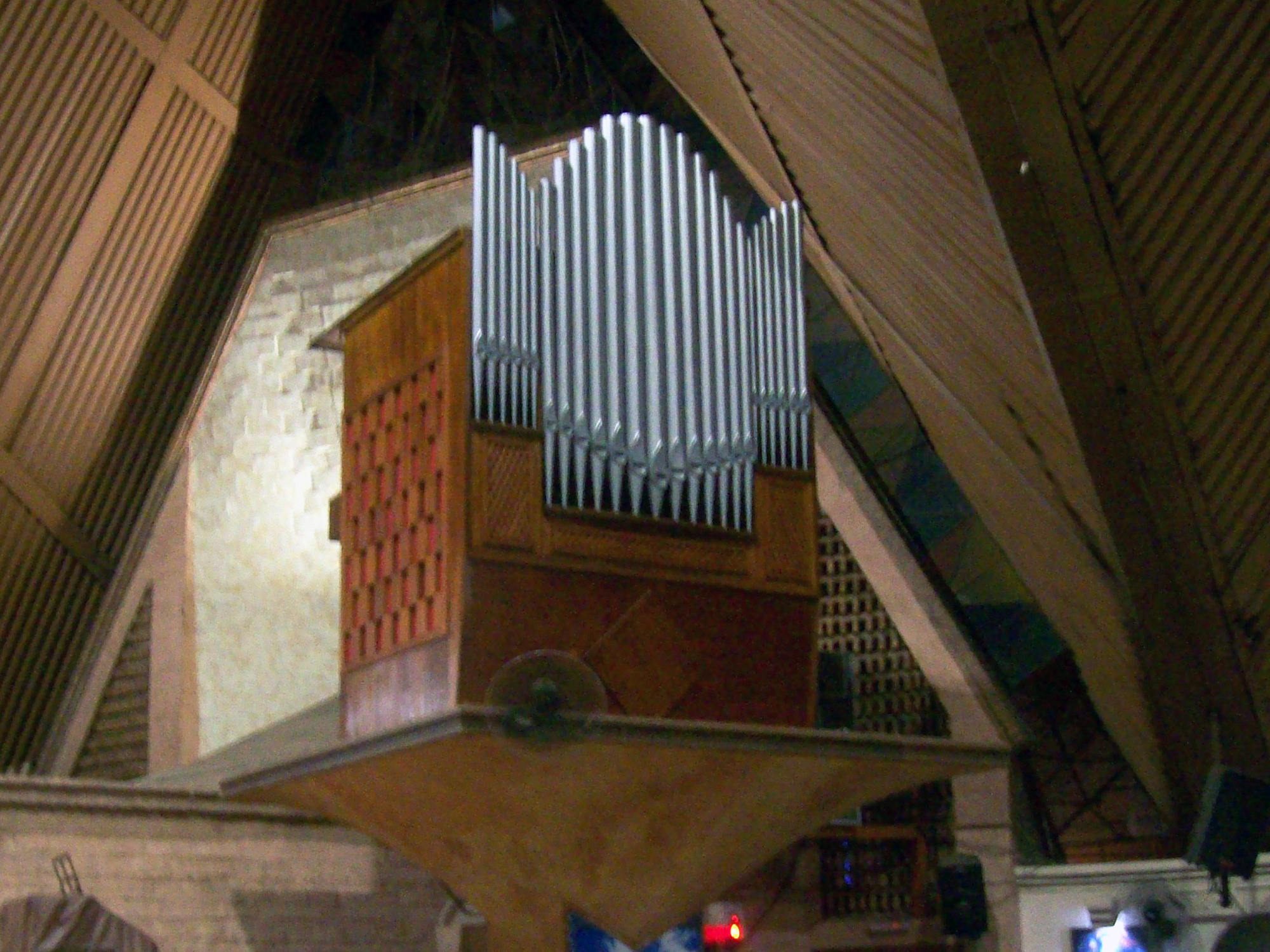
The pipe organ inside the cathedral, listed as a municipal cultural heritage site.

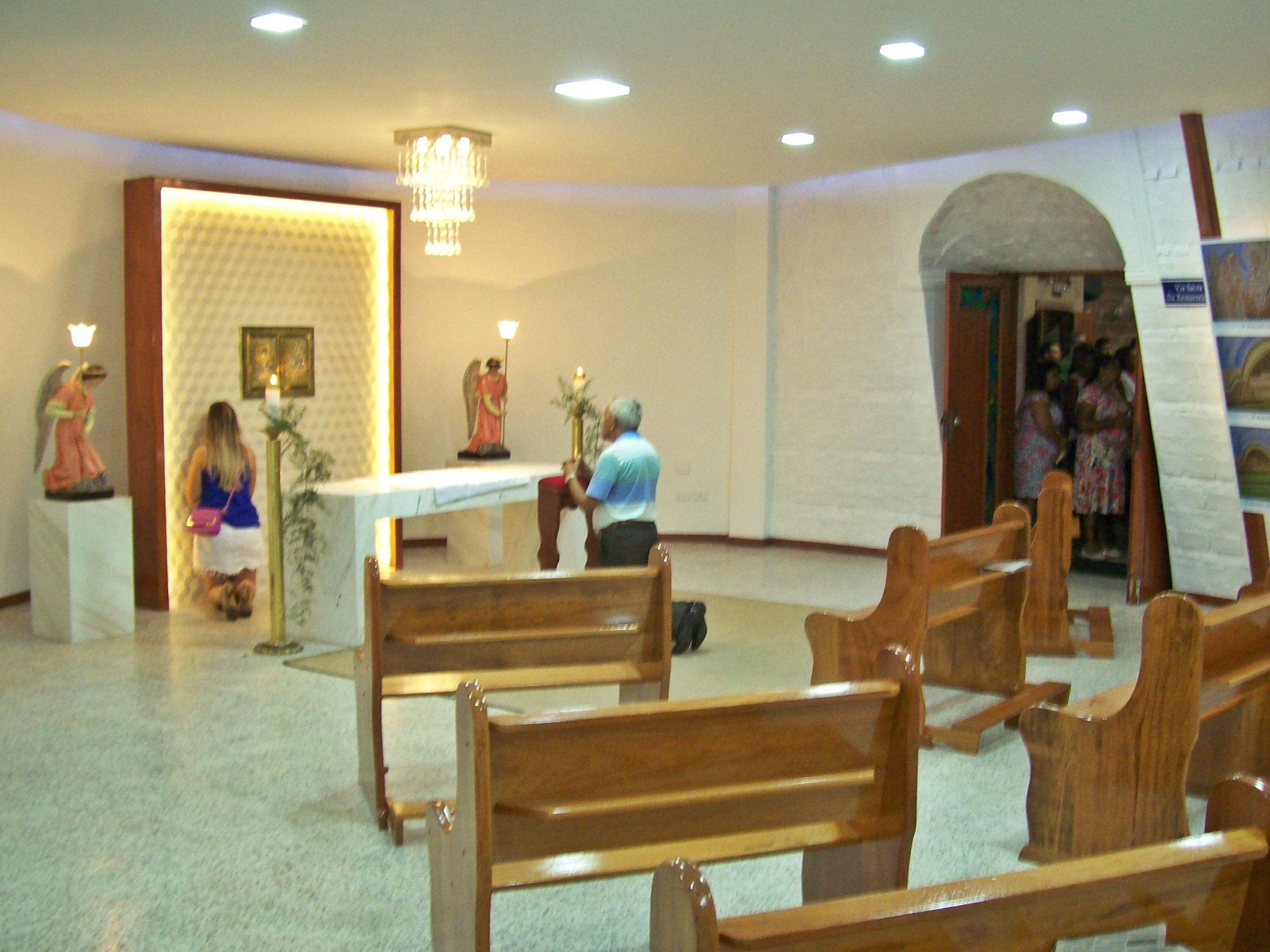
Blessed Sacrament Chapel, reopened in 2015.

== See also ==
- List of cathedrals in Brazil
- Saint Sebastian Parish
- Saint Sebastian Parish Church
