= Saint Sebastian Parish Church, Coronel Fabriciano =

Catholic Church in Brazil

Saint Sebastian Parish Church
- Igreja Matriz de São Sebastião
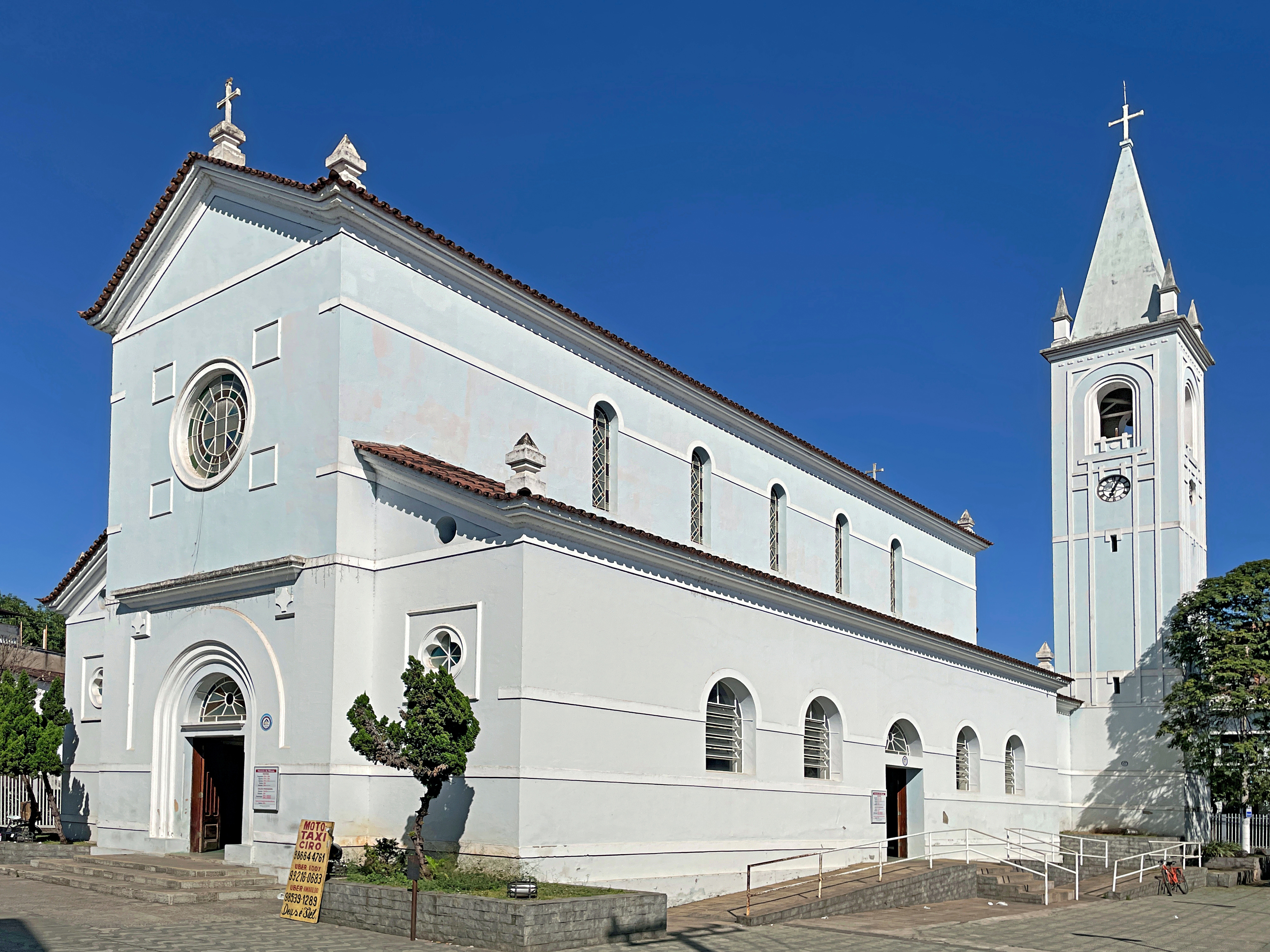
- View of the Saint Sebastian Parish Church

- Location of the Church

Religion
- Affiliation: Catholic

Location
- Municipality: Coronel Fabriciano
- State: Minas Gerais
- Country: Brazil
- Coordinates: 19°31′43″S 42°37′30″W

Architecture
- Completed: 1949

The Saint Sebastian Parish Church (Portuguese: Igreja Matriz de São Sebastião) is a Catholic religious temple located in the Brazilian city of Coronel Fabriciano, in the interior of the state of Minas Gerais. It was inaugurated in 1949, consolidating the installation of the first religious institution based in the Vale do Aço metropolitan area as a result of the arrival of the Congregation of the Most Holy Redeemer in August 1948, responsible for the final phase of the construction of the church and for maintaining the Saint Sebastian Parish.

In 1979, it became the co-cathedral of the Diocese of Itabira, a title it held until 1993. Designated a national monument in 1997, the Saint Sebastian Cathedral was recognized as a cultural heritage when it was inaugurated. The church can accommodate a total of 200 people, and has been the stage for many weddings, baptisms, and religious celebrations in the city.

== History ==
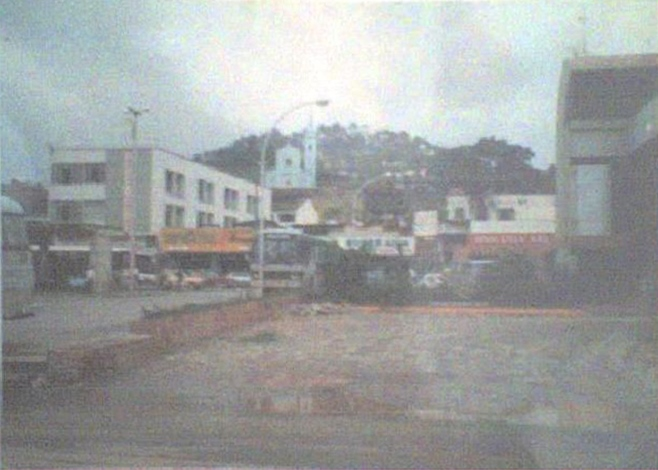
Downtown Fabriciano seen from the Bus Terminal in 1991 with the Parish Church in the background.

The construction of the current Saint Sebastian Parish Church began in 1946 with the purpose of replacing the first church in the current downtown area of the city, which was inaugurated in 1929 and was in ruins. The architectural style was defined by the then archbishop of Mariana, Dom Helvécio Gomes de Oliveira, and the preliminary work was led by Father Deolindo Coelho, responsible for the local curate, subordinate to the Our Lady of Nazareth Parish, based in Antônio Dias. The origin of the project, however, is unknown.

In August 1948, the Congregation of the Most Holy Redeemer was installed in the then district of Coronel Fabriciano, being responsible for the maintenance of the new Saint Sebastian Parish and for the completion of the works. In December of the same year Coronel Fabriciano was emancipated, being established on January 1, 1949. On that date the Parish Church, still under construction, received a solemn mass in honor of the occasion. Shortly afterwards, specifically on January 10, 1949, the town's old church collapsed after heavy rain. The current Saint Sebastian Parish Church, on the other hand, was inaugurated with the enthronement of the image of the patron saint St. Sebastian in August 1949.

The collapse of the old cathedral of Itabira, a few days after the resignation of the then diocesan bishop Dom Marcos Antônio Noronha in November 1970, led to the transfer of the functions of the episcopal liturgical space to the Saint Sebastian Parish Church in Coronel Fabriciano. This led to the designation of this city as one of the seats of the Diocese of Itabira by means of the decree Cum urbs vulgo Coronel Fabriciano of Pope John Paul II, dated June 1, 1979, which changed the name of the circumscription to "Diocese of Itabira-Fabriciano". In this way the temple exercised the function of diocesan co-cathedral until the inauguration of the Saint Sebastian Cathedral in 1993.

The construction of the current Saint Sebastian Cathedral - five times bigger than the Parish Church - had been speculated about since the mid-1980s, boosted by the growing number of people attending, even after the Parish Church went through a major renovation promoted by vicar Dom Lélis Lara in 1971. Throughout its existence it has had a total of seven changes in its painting, the most recent after being renovated and reinaugurated on June 8, 2014, and now presents the original colors blue on the outside and white inside.

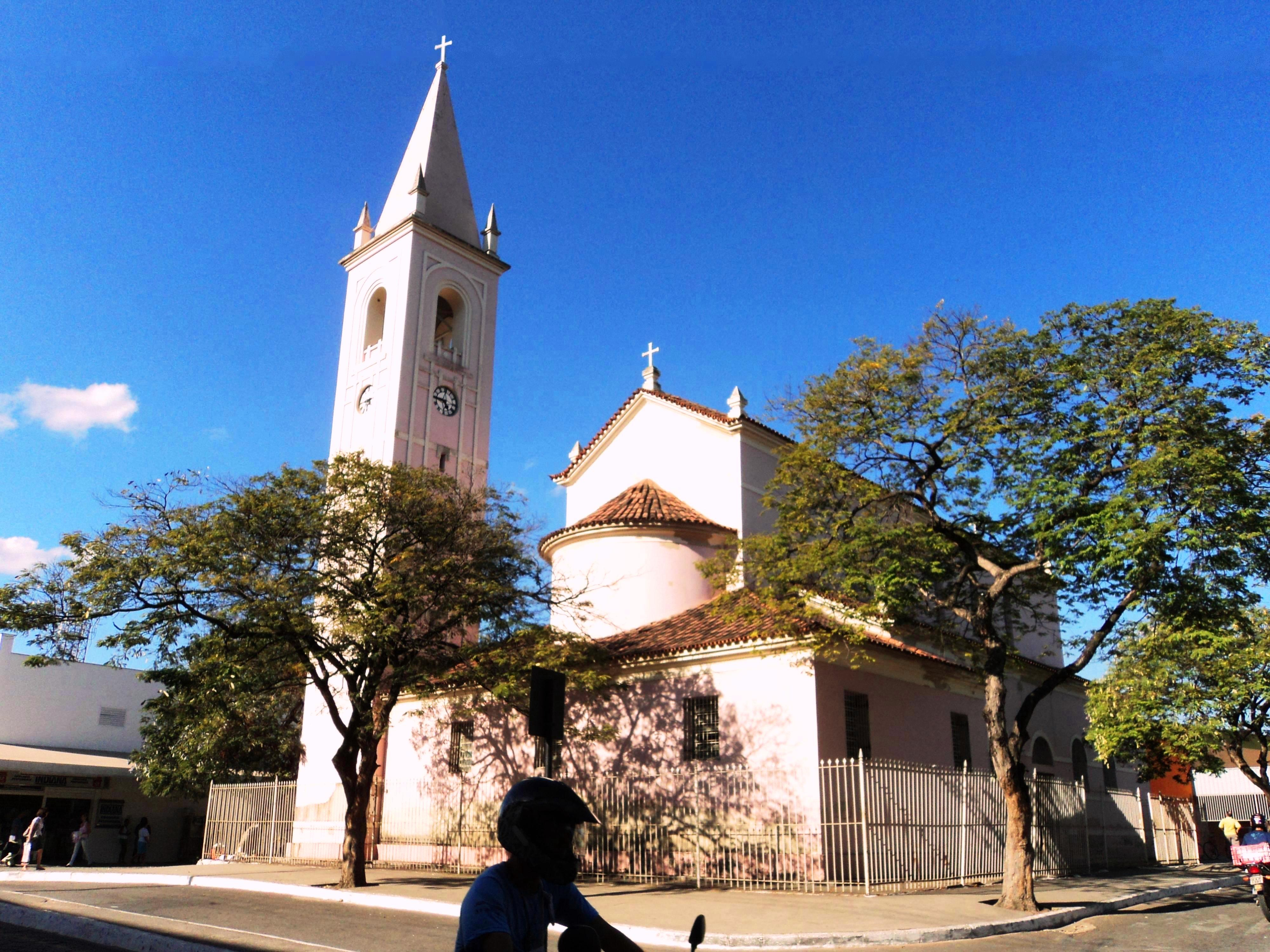
Parish Church in 2011, with pink exterior paint.

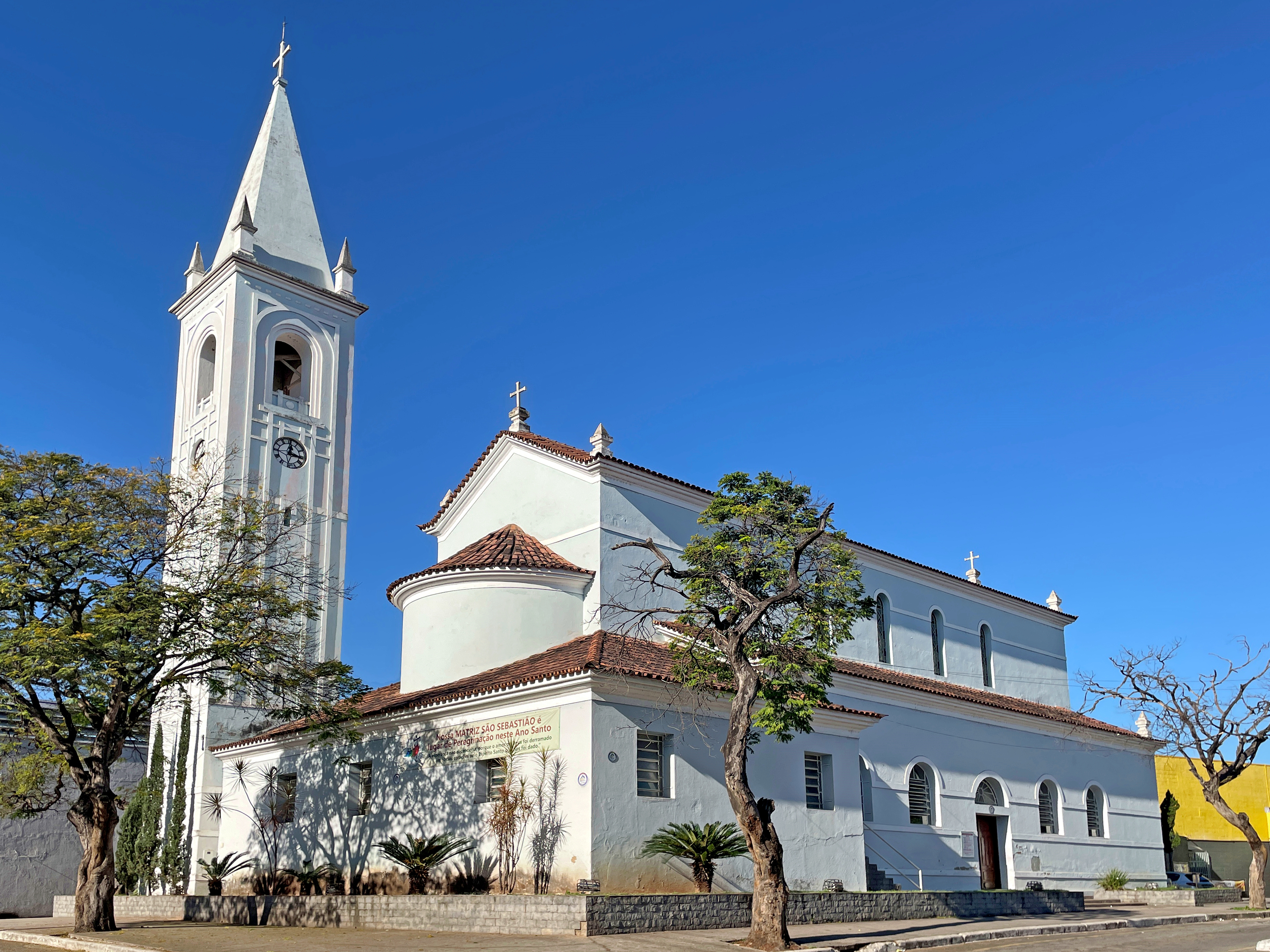
View of the Saint Sebastian Parish Church from Doutor Querubino Street.

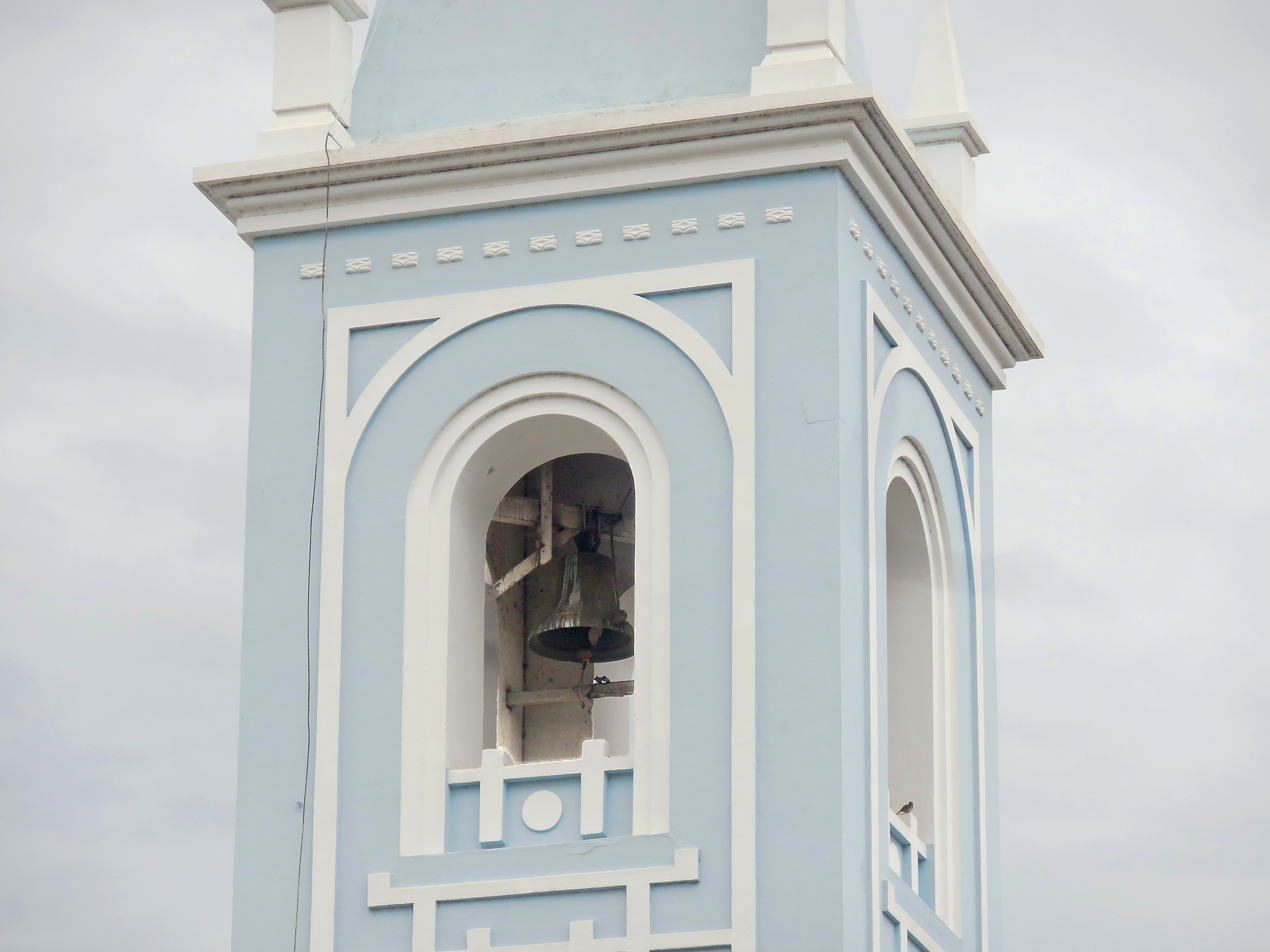
View of the bell of the church, located in its tower.

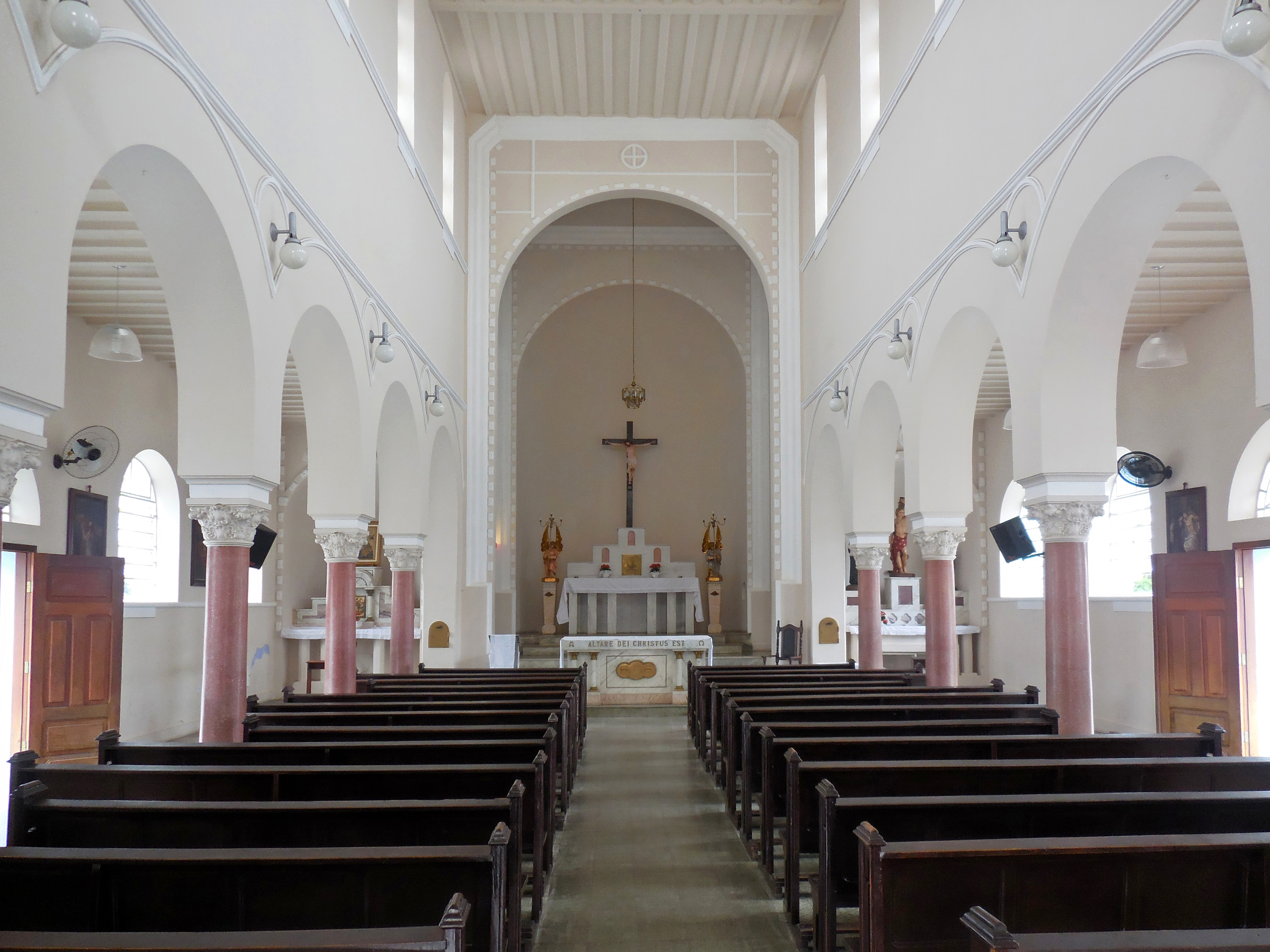
Interior of the Saint Sebastian Parish Church.

== Implementation and collection ==
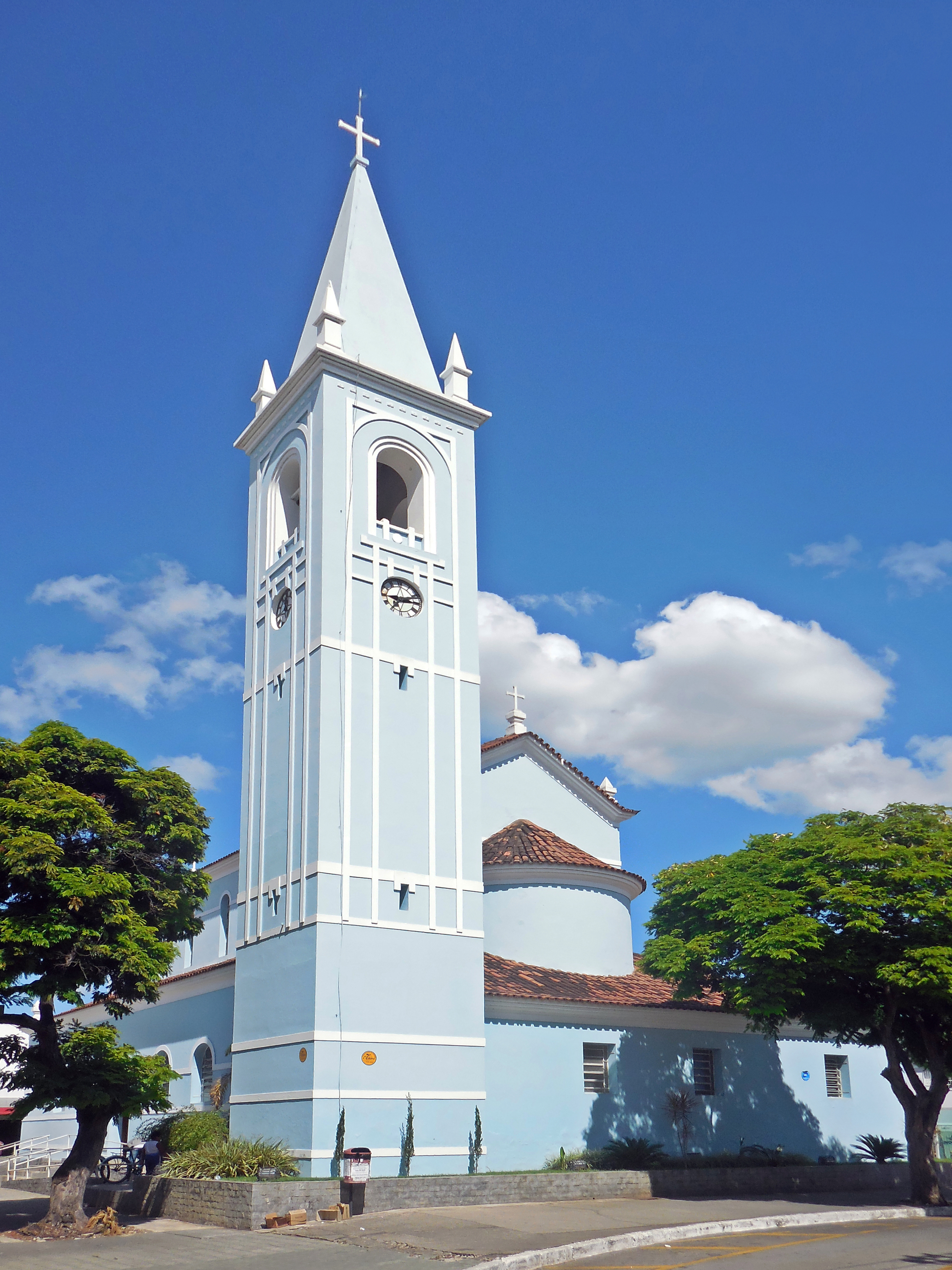
The Saint Sebastian Parish Church with the tower featured.

The side facades of the temple are symmetrical; the back facade faces Doutor Querubino Street, while the main facade faces an esplanade, and can be seen from several points around downtown Fabriciano. The 19-meter tower, detached from the body of the building, has a square plan, with details in relief and a sloped slab roof, with a bell and a clock on top, the latter manufactured in 1952 in the city of Jacutinga, south of Minas Gerais. The bell was modernized in 2014, and is programmed to ring at 6am, 12pm, 6pm, and 10pm.

In the 1980s, a fence was built around the church to protect it from graffiti and vandalism, but it was removed after the 2014 renovation, making way for a garden designed by architect Lígia Araújo. The presence of rose and stained glass windows is also a striking external feature. In 1984, the internal slab was built to replace the wooden ceiling. The floor contains hydraulic tiles and granite and the side arcades are composed of high raised columns with lighting from fluorecent lamps installed in its entablature. The interior of the church houses a set of 14 oil paintings by Carlos Oswald depicting the Via Crucis, inaugurated in 1954.

The whole set was declared municipal cultural heritage on March 31, 1997, and is included in the architectural complex that includes the Professor Pedro Calmon State School (1952) and the Dom Lélis Lara Parish Hall (1959). Among other works, the most important are the images of the Dead Lord, the Good Shepherd, and Our Lady of Sorrows donated by Joaquim Alves Júnior, a Belgo-Mineira employee, in 1949, and of Saint Gerard and Saint Sebastian, the latter donated by Rotildino Avelino that same year, consolidating the temple's inauguration. The main altar, in Carrara marble, was installed on the same occasion, and the baptismal font was acquired through donations from the community in 1950. Rotildino Avelino also donated the image of Saint Sebastian of the old Parish Church, ordered from Rio de Janeiro in the 1920s, which he himself sheltered after rescuing it from the debris of the collapsed temple.

== Culture ==
The inauguration of the Saint Sebastian Parish Church, in 1949, consolidated the installation of the first religious institution based in the region of today's Vale do Aço, as a result of the coming of the Congregation of the Most Holy Redeemer in August 1948, responsible for the final phase of construction and maintenance of the Saint Sebastian Parish. As already mentioned, Coronel Fabriciano was emancipated from Antônio Dias in December of that same year.

The construction of the temple centralized the religious activities of the city, maintaining the organization of weekly weddings and daily masses. The celebrations and events related to the feasts of Saint Sebastian, Ash Wednesday, Holy Week and the Misa de Gallo of the Saint Sebastian Parish were held around the Parish Church until the Cathedral was built. The route of the Corpus Christi carpet started in the church and went all the way to Pedro Nolasco Street, then returned to the temple, being transferred to the neighborhoods Santa Helena and Professores after the completion of the new diocesan headquarters.

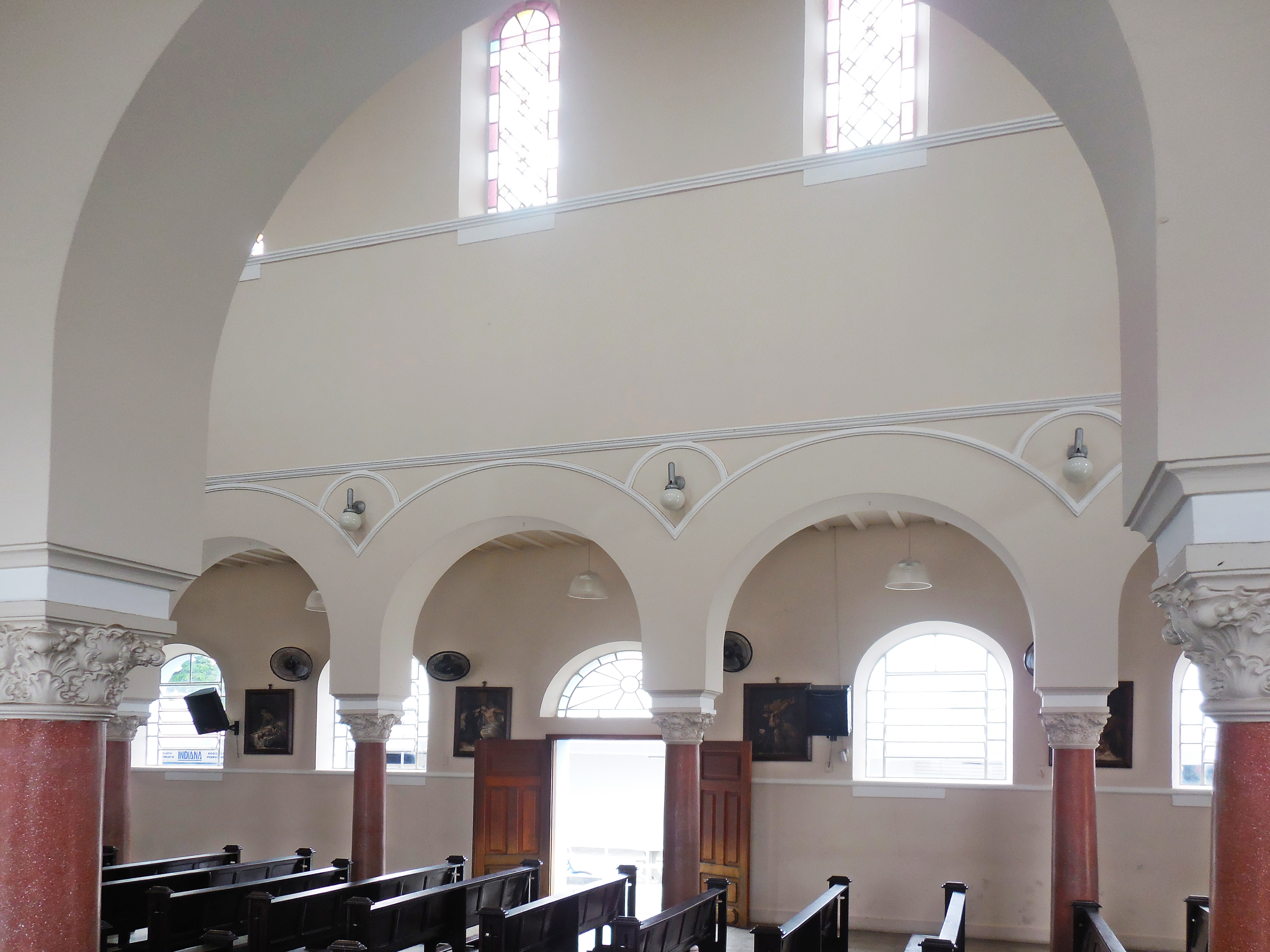
Detail of the arches inside the church.

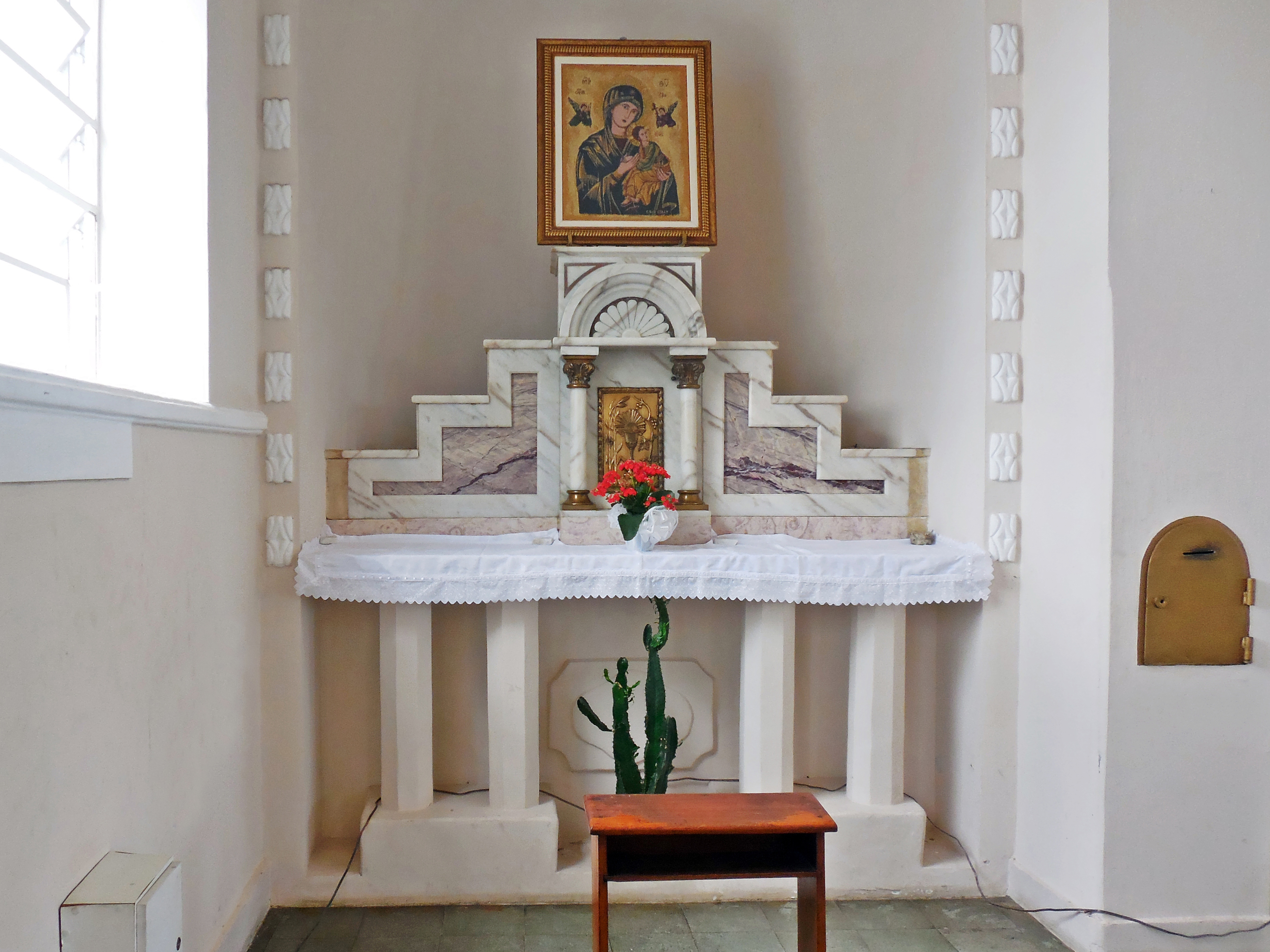
Left panel: altar of Our Lady of Perpetual Help.

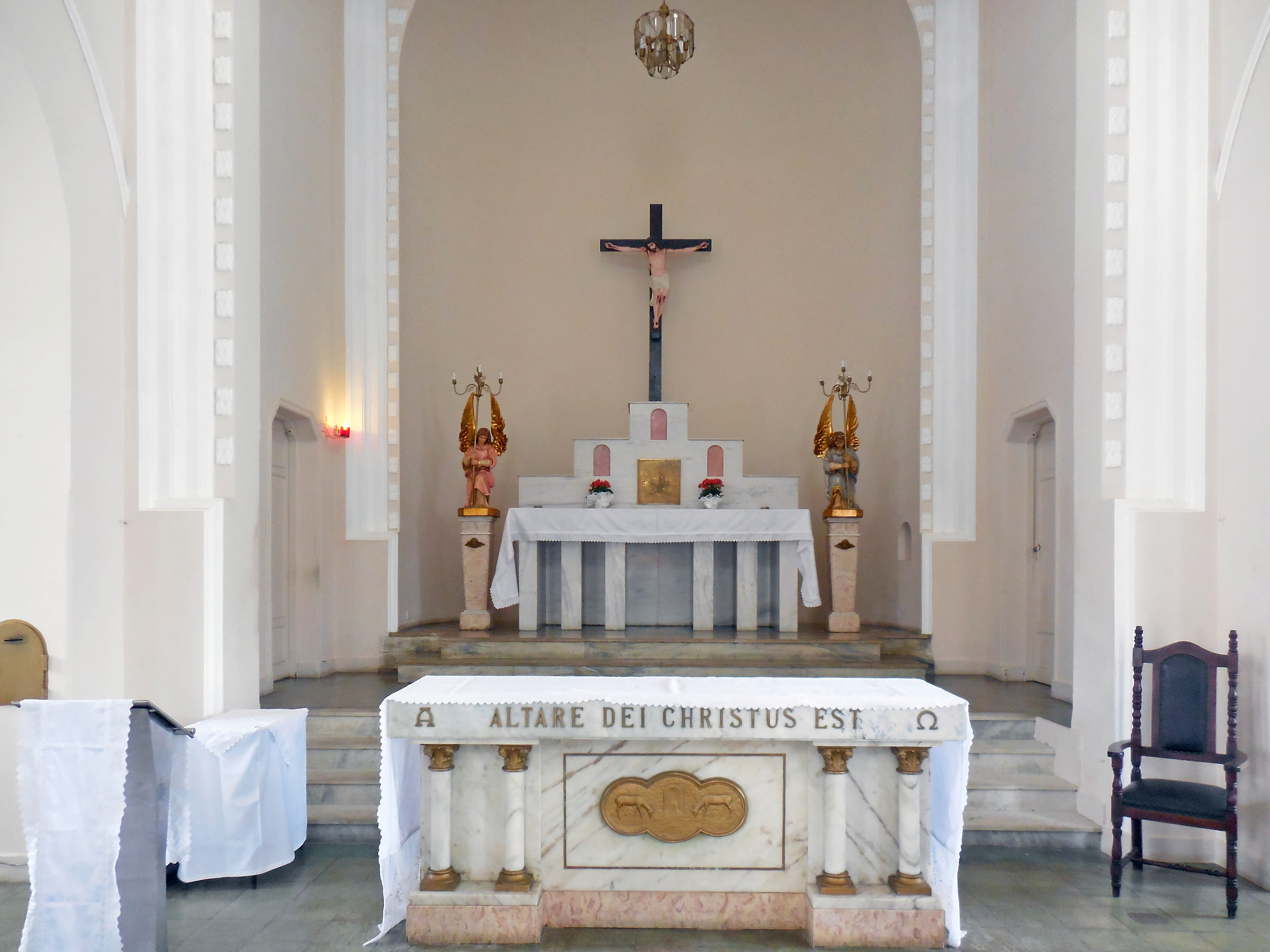
Detail of the altar of the Saint Sebastian Parish Church.

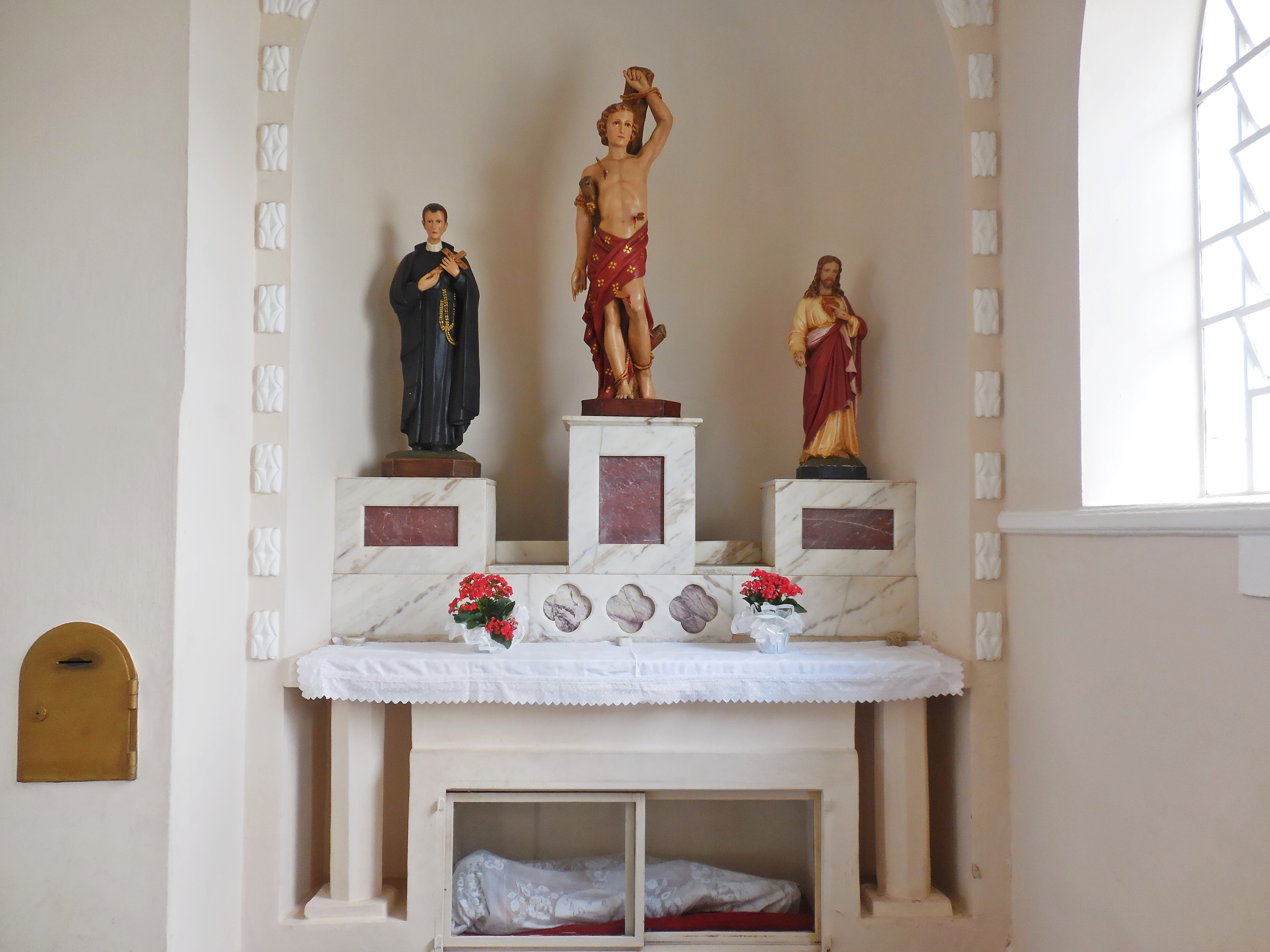
Right panel: Saint Gerard (above left), Saint Sebastian (center), Jesus (right) and the Dead Christ (covered below).

== See also ==
- Saint Sebastian Parish
- Saint Sebastian Cathedral
- Diocese of Itabira-Fabriciano
