= Rubem Siqueira Maia =

Brazilian physician and politician (1908–1982)

Mayor of Coronel Fabriciano
- In office 15 March 1949 – 30 January 1953
- Preceded by: Antônio Gonçalves Gravatá (Intendant)
- Succeeded by: Lauro Pereira da Conceição

Mayor of Antônio Dias
- In office 1930s

Personal details
- Born: 15 February 1908 Curvelo, Minas Gerais
- Died: 20 January 1982 (aged 73) Coronel Fabriciano, Minas Gerais
- Party: Social Democratic Party
- Spouse: Nilza Winter Maia
- Children: 4
- Parent(s): Ana Siqueira Maia and José Ferreira Maia
- Occupation: Physician

Rubem Siqueira Maia (February 15, 1908, in Curvelo – January 20, 1982, in Coronel Fabriciano) was a Brazilian physician and politician. After living in São João del-Rei during his childhood and graduating from the School of Medicine of Federal University of Minas Gerais (UFMG), he moved to Vale do Rio Doce to work on the construction of the Vitória-Minas Railway (EFVM) in the 1930s.

Later, he settled in Antônio Dias, where he was elected mayor. He stood out as one of the creators of the Hospital Siderúrgica (currently Doutor José Maria Morais Hospital) next to Belgo-Mineira Steel Company in the district of Melo Viana. He also created a pro-emancipation commission for the district, supported by his childhood friend and state deputy Tancredo Neves. This process culminated in the creation of the current municipality of Coronel Fabriciano in 1948, with Rubem being the first mayor elected the following year.

== Origin and background ==
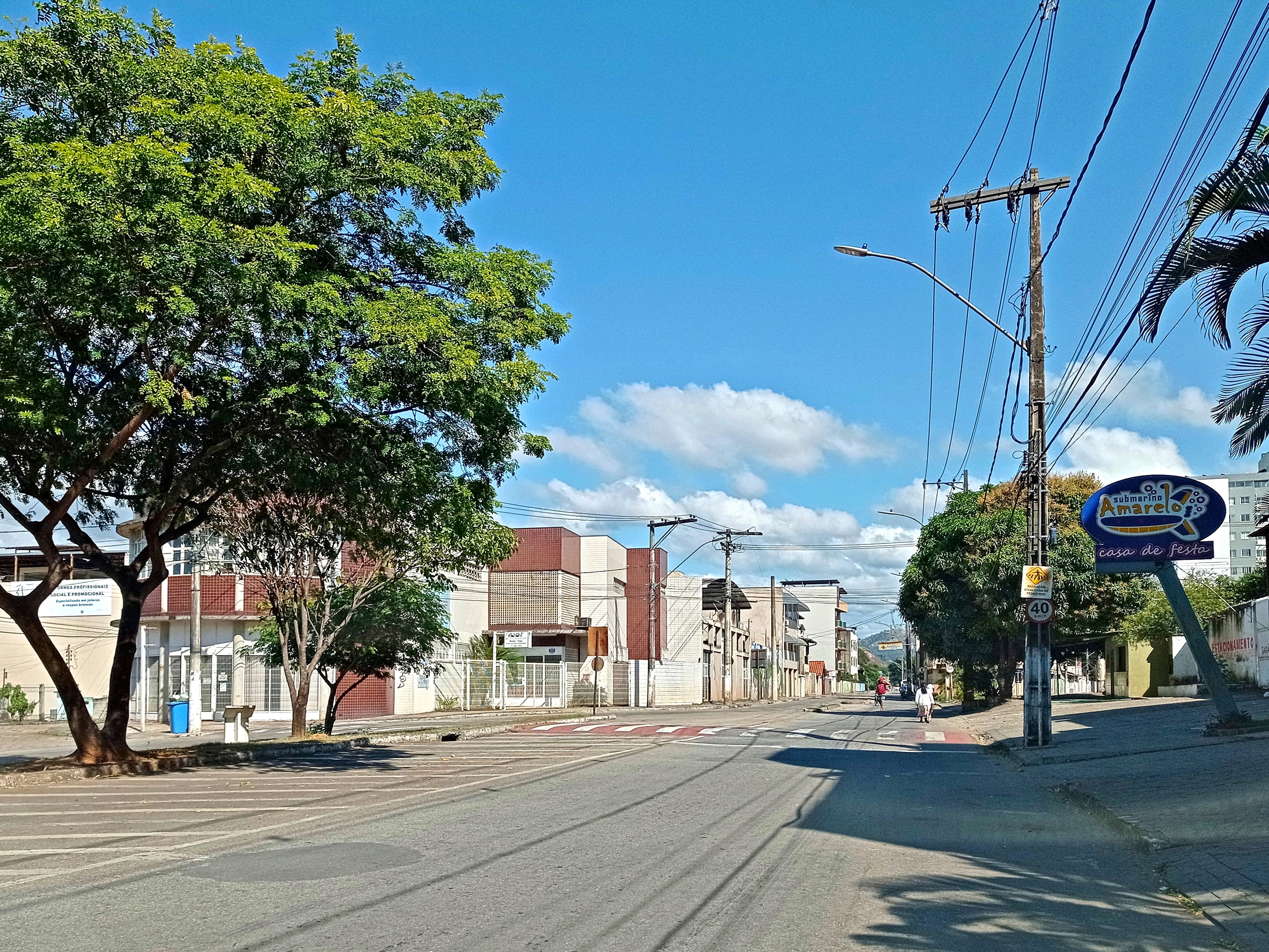
Stretch of the Rubem Siqueira Maia Avenue in the Santa Helena neighborhood, in Coronel Fabriciano, Minas Gerais, Brazil.

Rubem Siqueira Maia, son of José Ferreira Maia and Ana Siqueira Maia, was born in the city of Curvelo, in the state of Minas Gerais, on February 15, 1908. He was married to Nilza Winter Maia, with whom he had four children (Yole, Walter, Ana Lúcia, and Rubem Filho). After living in São João del-Rei during his childhood, he graduated from the School of Medicine of Federal University of Minas Gerais (UFMG) in the early 1930s. He soon began working as a physician during the construction of the Vitória-Minas Railway (EFVM) by Vale do Rio Doce. Although he settled in Antônio Dias in 1937, he attended workers in Nova Era and Governador Valadares.

Later on, he moved to the then district of Melo Viana, motivated by the implementation of the Belgo-Mineira Steel Company industrial complex in the town. He stood out as one of the first health professionals of the Hospital Siderúrgica (currently the Doutor José Maria Morais Hospital), created by the company in 1936 with the objective of fighting an epidemic of tropical diseases which advanced in the area. Rubem also worked in the district as a trader and contractor for Acesita in the 1940s.

Rubem left his job at the Hospital Siderúrgica in 1945, after being forbidden by the Belgo-Mineira's superintendent Joaquim Gomes da Silveira Neto to move to Santa Terezinha Farm, recently built by the family in the region of the current Aldeia do Lago neighborhood. Joaquim Gomes considered the new residence too far from Rubem's workplace, who, for this reason, preferred to give up his position at the company, move to the farm and open his own office near the Calado Station. In the 1960s, Santa Terezinha Farm had its lands divided and sold by Santa Terezinha Real Estate Agency, owned by the Maia family, which originated the districts of Aldeia do Lago, Mangueiras, Ponte Nova, Santa Terezinha and Santa Terezinha II.

== Public life and politics ==
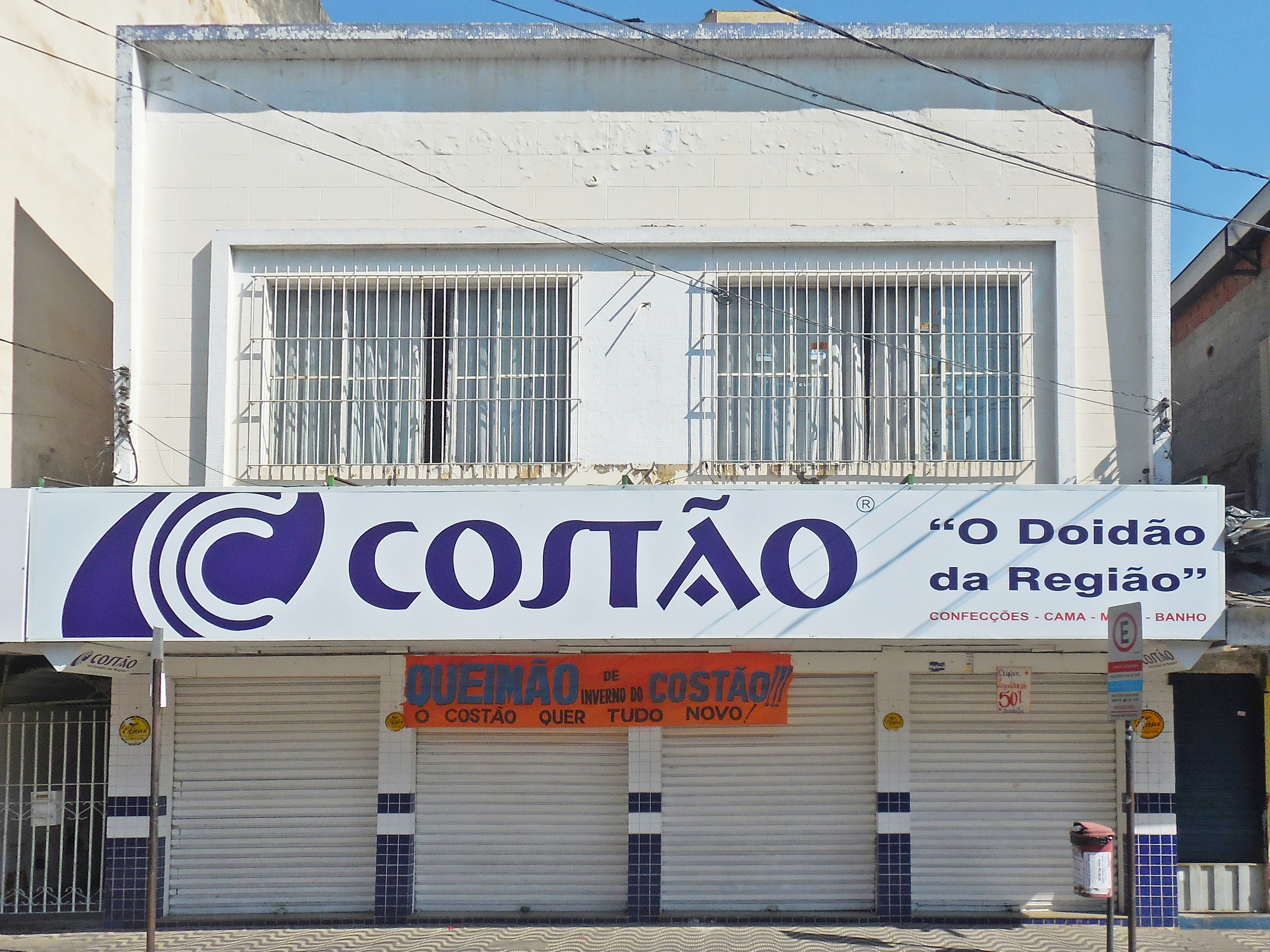
Facade of the Costão in the House Saint Gerald, in Coronel Fabriciano, Minas Gerais, Brazil. The building, built in 1948, served as the first city hall.

While working at the Hospital Siderúrgica, Rubem was elected mayor of Antônio Dias, affiliated to the Social Democratic Party (PSD); he conciliated the city administration and his work as a physician. In 1947, he was responsible for organizing a commission that aimed to emancipate the former district of Melo Viana - now called Coronel Fabriciano -, formed by businessmen and other local political and religious leaders. He also received the support of the state deputy Tancredo Neves, his childhood friend from whom he had split up when they graduated from UFMG - Rubem in medicine school and Tancredo in law school. A first emancipation proposal had been rejected by the Minas Gerais government, since the district had about 5 thousand residents at the time, while a minimum of 10 thousand inhabitants was required.

At Tancredo Neves' suggestion, baptism records were provided by the local vicar, Father Deolindo Coelho, to be added to the number of inhabitants obtained by the census precariously carried out by the government of Antônio Dias, exceeding the minimum required. As a result, a new emancipation proposal was sent to the Legislative Assembly of Minas Gerais (ALMG) on February 25, 1948. That same year, Rubem Siqueira Maia created the first newspaper of the district, O Progresso, which brought regional news and collaborated with the promotion of political force for the emancipation of Coronel Fabriciano, declared on December 27, 1948.

On March 15, 1949, Rubem Siqueira Maia became the first elected mayor of Coronel Fabriciano, next to Silvino Pereira as vice-mayor. He succeeded the intendant Antônio Gonçalves Gravatá, who had been sworn in after the city was established with the task of structuring the administration of the government until the first election was held. Rubem remained in the position until January 30, 1953, when he stepped aside to run, unsuccessfully, for state deputy, being succeeded by the then vice-mayor Lauro Pereira da Conceição. After the defeat in the legislative elections, he was nominated as the local superintendent of Belgo-Mineira by the company's president at the time, Louis Ensch, a position he held until 1964.

=== Coronel Fabriciano City Hall ===
After the emancipation of Coronel Fabriciano, Rubem Siqueira Maia gave the House Saint Gerald, his property, to serve as the first headquarters of the city hall. The two-story house, which is located at Pedro Nolasco Street and was built in 1948, operated as the city's Executive Branch until 1960, and later hosted a clothing store, then the O Brasileirão supermarket, and then a branch of the Costão chain of stores. During his mandate in the city, the highlights were the installation of the Professor Pedro Calmon State School (the first school building in the town), the structuring of the public electricity supply, and the paving of downtown Fabriciano.

In the early 1950s, Rubem Siqueira Maia suffered an impeachment attempt started by the City Council, due to an extended period in which he was out of office. The politician had traveled to Rio de Janeiro, the federal capital at the time, to meet with General Macedo Soares, president of Acesita. The purpose of the trip was to request that the company, operating in Coronel Fabriciano, provide the municipality with the electric power generated by the steel mill. However, upon arriving in the city of Rio de Janeiro, Rubem was informed that the general was traveling to Europe, and he had to wait another six days for his return. Despite the setback, the meeting resulted in an agreement that authorized the sharing of the electric grid. When he returned to Fabriciano, the mayor managed to avoid being removed from office by proving the meeting and the benefit obtained.

== Death and tributes ==
Rubem Siqueira Maia died on January 20, 1982. As a tribute, one of the main streets of Coronel Fabriciano, Doutor Rubem Siqueira Maia Avenue, was named after him. The road intersects neighborhoods that are located in the area of the old Santa Terezinha Farm, connecting the Centro neighborhood to the Mangueiras neighborhood. Although the original area of the old farm has been plotted, the headquarters was kept and preserved by the heirs in an isolated location in the Aldeia do Lago neighborhood, where they built the first high-standard private condominium in the region in the 1990s.

Rubem's wife also received a tribute, lending her name to Nilza Winter Maia Street, located in the Santa Terezinha II neighborhood. The José Ferreira Maia State School, located in the district of Cachoeira do Vale, in Timóteo, is named after the politician's father. This educational institution was created in 1955, initially named Doutor Rubem Siqueira Maia Rural School. On June 25, 2020, the Doutor Walter Luiz Winter Maia Emergency Care Unit (UPA) was inaugurated, named after one of Rubem's sons, also a physician and former director of the former Hospital Siderúrgica, who died in 2014. The health center is located in the neighborhood Silvio Pereira II, in Coronel Fabriciano.

== See also ==
- Aperam South America
- Vitória-Minas Railway
- Vale do Aço metropolitan area
