= Pedro Calmon =

Brazilian historian

- Born: December 23 1902; Amargosa, Bahia, Brazil
- Died: June 16 1985; Rio de Janeiro, Rio de Janeiro, Brazil
- Education: Federal University of Bahia; University of Brazil
- Occupations: Politician, professor, writer
- Notable work: História social do Brasil - 3 vols

Pedro Calmon Moniz de Bittencourt (December 23, 1902 – June 16, 1985) was a Brazilian historian, essayist, professor, and politician. A prolific author who explored many genres, including biographies, short stories, and crônicas, he is best known for his studies on the history of Brazil.

== Biography ==
=== Early years ===
Born in the interior of Bahia into a traditional family, Calmon enrolled at his state's Faculty of Law and later transferred to the National Faculty of Law, from which he graduated. In 1923, while still a student, he launched his literary career with the collection of short stories Pedras d'Armas, edited and published by Monteiro Lobato. Around this time, he made the acquaintance of the intellectual Capistrano de Abreu, who stimulated his interest in the historical formation of Brazil.

In 1925, he began working in the National Museum as a conservationist and curator and later established a chair in Brazilian history within the course of museology. In 1926, Calmon began his academic career as both a jurist and a historian, publishing Direito de propriedade, a study on private law, and A conquista: história das bandeiras baianas, an examination of the phenomenon of bandeirantismo in Bahia. Calmon's early work drew the attention of Rio's intellectual milieu, and he was elected a member of the Brazilian Historic and Geographical Institute in 1931.

=== Career ===
In 1927, he was elected as a state deputy of Bahia, becoming a federal deputy in 1935, when he was appointed as professor of the history of Brazil at the newly established University of the Federal District. The following year, he was elected a member of the Brazilian Academy of Letters. In 1939, Calmon became chair professor of Constitutional Law at his alma mater. From 1950 to 1951, he served as Minister of Education under president Eurico Gaspar Dutra, and again from 1959 to 1961 under president Juscelino Kubitschek.

Calmon served as rector of the University of Brazil from 1948 to 1950 and from 1951 to 1966, presided over the Brazilian Academy of Letters in 1945, and taught at the traditional Colégio Pedro II. His most popular works were didactic books.

In 1961, Calmon nominated the World Esperanto Association for the Nobel Peace Prize. In 1966, he nominated Habib Ben Ali Bourguiba for the same prize in recognition of his ''efforts towards peaceful coexistence between the Arab world and Israel''.

=== Legacy ===
Calmon has been described by academics as a conservative historian of monarchist sympathies and as a representative of both the social elites and a pre-professionalized period of Brazilian historiography, when formal faculties of history had not yet been established. His works influenced generations of students and intellectuals, including Gilberto Freyre, who referred to Calmon as his ''master''.

Throughout his life, Calmon received several honors and distinctions, including the Grand-Cross of the Military Order of Christ (1961); the Grand-Cross of the Order of Infante D. Henrique (1971); the Order of Merit (1972); and the Grand-Cross of the Military Order of Saint James of the Sword (1978).

The Fundação Pedro Calmon [pt], a government agency responsible for managing the system of public libraries and archives in the state of Bahia, and the Professor Pedro Calmon State School, are named in his honor.

== Works ==
=== Biographies and historiographies ===
- Anchieta, o santo do Brasil (1930)
- O crime de Antonio Vieira (1931)
- Por Brasil e Portugal. Sermões do Padre Vieira, anotados (1933)
- O Marquês de Abrantes (1933)
- Gomes Carneiro, o general da República (1933)
- O rei cavaleiro: Vida de D. Pedro I (1933)
- O rei do Brasil: Vida de D. João VI (1935)
- Vida e amores de Castro Alves (1935)
- O rei filósofo: A vida de D. Pedro II (1938)
- Princesa Isabel, a Redentora (1941)
- História do Brasil na poesia do povo (1941)
- A vida de Castro Alves (1947)
- A bala de ouro- História de um crime romântico (1947)
- História da literatura baiana (1949)
- Castro Alves: o homem e a obra (1973)
- Para melhor conhecer Castro Alves (1974)

=== Literature ===
- Pedras d’armas, short stories (1923)
- O tesouro de Belchior, novel (1929)
- Figuras de azulejo, crônicas (1939)
- Estados Unidos de leste a oeste, crônicas (1942)

=== History ===
- A conquista: história das bandeiras baianas (1926)
- História da Bahia (1927)
- História da Independência do Brasil (1929)
- História da civilização brasileira (1932)
- História social do Brasil, 1º vol.: Espírito da sociedade colonial (1935)
- História social do Brasil, 2º vol: Espírito da sociedade imperial (1937)
- História social do Brasil, 3º vol: A época republicana (1939)
- História da Casa da Torre (1939)
- História do Brasil, 1º vol.: As origens (1939)
- História do Brasil, 2º vol.: A formação (1941)
- História diplomática do Brasil (1941)
- Brasil e América: História de uma política (1941)
- História do Brasil, 3º vol.: A organização (1943)
- História do Brasil, 4º vol.: O Império (1947)
- História da fundação da Bahia (1949)
- História do Brasil, 5º vol.: A República (1955)

=== Law ===
- Direito de propriedade (1926)
- Reforma constitucional da Bahia (1929)
- Curso de Direito Constitucional (1937)
- Curso de Teoria Geral do Estado (1941)
- O Estado e o Direito nos "Lusíadas" (1945)
- História das idéias políticas (1954)
