= Professor Pedro Calmon State School =

Public school in Brazil

Location
- Coronel Fabriciano, Minas Gerais; Brazil; 19°31′28″S 42°37′26″W

Information
- Type: Public
- Established: May 8, 1952; 74 years ago

Professor Pedro Calmon State School (Portuguese: Escola Estadual Professor Pedro Calmon) is a public educational institution in the Brazilian municipality of Coronel Fabriciano, in the interior of the state of Minas Gerais. It offers both lower (ages 11 to 14) and upper secondary education (ages 14 to 18), as well as adult education. It is the first school facility built in the city, and is located on one of the main streets in downtown Fabriciano, in a central position between the City Hall and the Saint Sebastian Parish Church.

== History ==
School courtyard

The Professor Pedro Calmon School Group, as it was originally called, was founded on May 8, 1952, to replace the old Reunidas Doutor Moacir Birro School, which was located on Pedro Nolasco Street. Its name was given by the then governor of Minas Gerais, Juscelino Kubitschek, in honor of professor Pedro Calmon, from Bahia, who had visited the state to receive the Medal of the Inconfidence. Initially, the school offered only primary education and was attended by the children of the city's most influential families, many of whom got good results in competitive university entrance exams. For about 30 years, it remained the most traditional public school in town, according to the City Hall inventory.

By the end of the 1950s, education in the city was still precarious, with high dropout rates and illiteracy. The institution could not support the demand for enrollments, exceeding the maximum capacity of 600 students in the classrooms, which required the use of annexed rooms in the Parish Hall. The situation was minimized from the 1960s on with the construction of new school groups in the city in collaboration with the state government. In 1994, the school stopped providing primary education and started offering only secondary education.

The building, which is part of the architectural complex that includes the Saint Sebastian Parish Church (1949) and the Parish Hall (1959), was declared a municipal cultural heritage site on April 28, 1999. Among the schools in the city and in the entire Vale do Aço Metropolitan Region, the Professor Pedro Calmon State School had the lowest score on the National High School Exam (Enem) a in 2010, and again in 2011. It underwent revitalization work in 2013, whose goals included the construction of a multi-sports court, which has been speculated about since 1990, given that physical education classes had been taking place in the schoolyard.

== See also ==
- History of Coronel Fabriciano
