= Our Lady of the Rosary Cathedral, Itabira =

Coordinates: 19.2650°S 40.5218°W

Our Lady of the Rosary Cathedral
- Catedral Nossa Senhora do Rosário
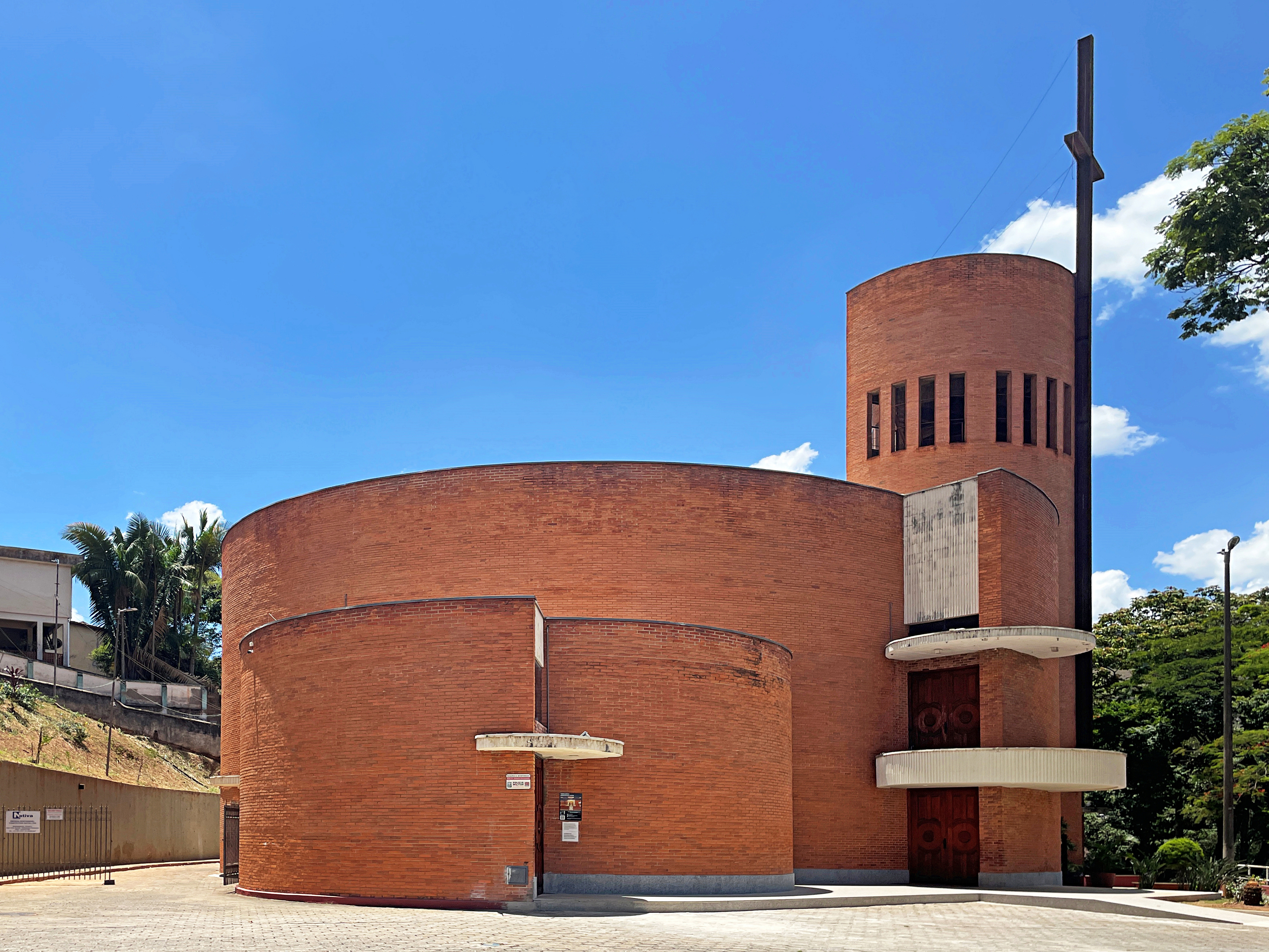
- Our Lady of the Rosary Cathedral, in Itabira
- Our Lady of the Rosary Cathedral
- Location: Itabira
- Country: Brazil
- Denomination: Roman Catholic Church

Our Lady of the Rosary Cathedral (Portuguese: Catedral Nossa Senhora do Rosário), also known as Itabira Cathedral, is a Catholic cathedral located in the municipality of Itabira, in the state of Minas Gerais in Brazil. It is the episcopal seat of the diocese of Itabira-Fabriciano, which also has another seat, the cathedral of St. Sebastian, in the city of Coronel Fabriciano.

== History ==
The parish of Our Lady of the Rosary of Itabira of the Mato Dentro was created on April 6, 1826. The church, known as Matriz do Rosário, was built in the first half of the 19th century. In 1965, with the creation of the Diocese of Itabira, the church of the Rosary became a cathedral. On November 9, 1970, after a long period of rain, one of the cathedral's side walls collapsed and one of the towers was badly damaged. The old cathedral was demolished and the current cathedral was built in the same place. Construction began in 1976 and was completed in 1985.

== See also ==
- Roman Catholicism in Brazil
- Our Lady of the Rosary
- Saint Sebastian Cathedral
- Saint Sebastian Parish
