= Roman Catholic Diocese of Itabira–Fabriciano =

Catholic ecclesiastical territory

Diocese of Itabira–Fabriciano Dioecesis Itabirensis–Fabriciannensis Diocese de Itabira-Fabriciano

Catholic
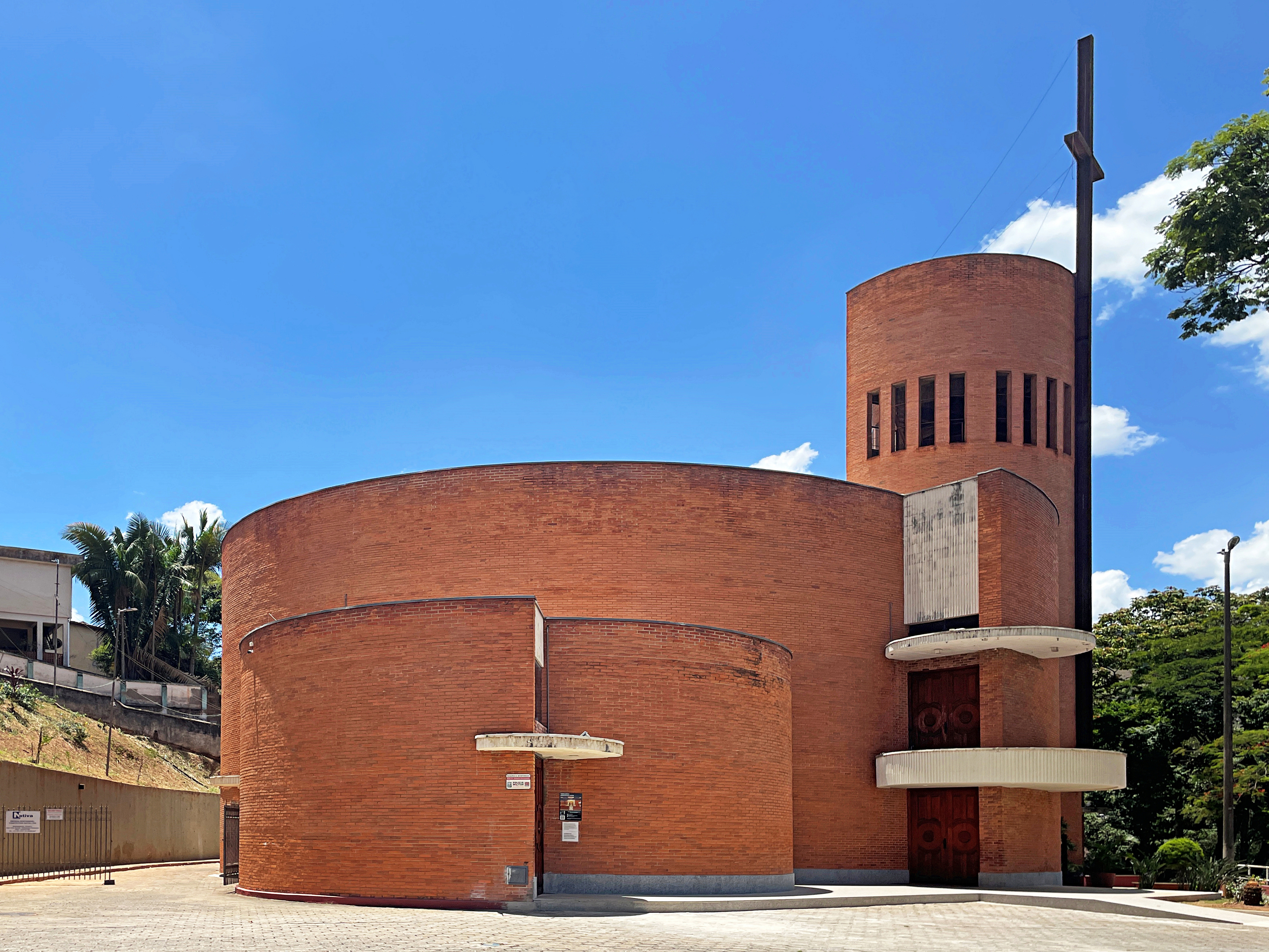
- Our Lady of the Rosary Cathedral, in Itabira

Location
- Country: Brazil
- Metropolitan: Archdiocese of Mariana
- Headquarters: Itabira, Minas Gerais, Brazil
- Coordinates: 19.6186°S 43.2267°W

Statistics
- Area: 8,888 km^{2} (3,432 sq mi)
- Population: Total; Catholics: (as of 2023); 1,096,476; 675,975 (61.6%)
- Parishes: 51

Information
- Denomination: Catholic Church
- Sui iuris church: Latin Church
- Rite: Roman Rite
- Established: 14 June 1965; 61 years ago
- Cathedral: Catedral Nossa Senhora do Rosário, Itabira
- Co-cathedral: Co-Catedral São Sebastião, Coronel Fabriciano
- Patron saint: Our Lady of Aparecida

Current leadership
- Pope: Leo XIV
- Bishop: Sede vacante
- Metropolitan Archbishop: Airton José dos Santos
- Bishops emeritus: Odilon Guimarães Moreira

Map
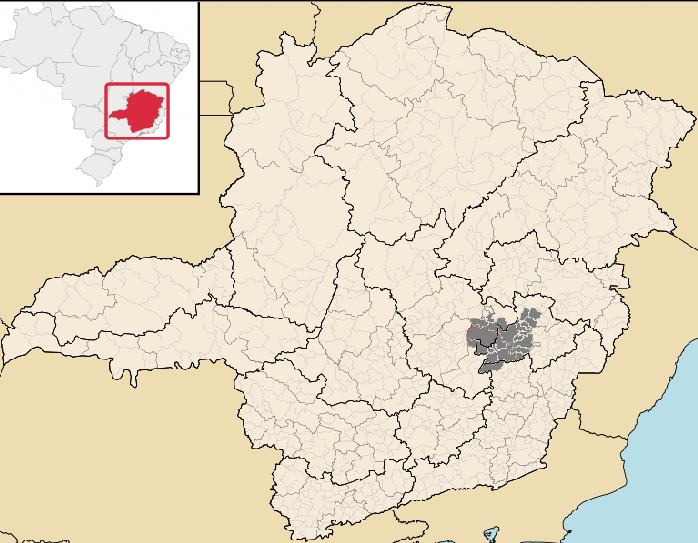

The Roman Catholic Diocese of Itabira–Fabriciano (Latin: Dioecesis Itabirensis-Fabriciannensis) is a diocese located in the cities of Itabira and Coronel Fabriciano in the ecclesiastical province of Mariana in Brazil.

== History ==
- 14 June 1965: Established as Diocese of Itabira from the Metropolitan Archdiocese of Diamantina and Metropolitan Archdiocese of Mariana
- 1 June 1979: Renamed as Diocese of Itabira–Fabriciano

== Leadership ==
Bishops of Itabira (Roman Rite)

- Marcos Antônio Noronha (7 July 1965 – 7 November 1970), resigned
- Mário Teixeira Gurgel, S.D.S. (26 April 1971 – 1 June 1979 see below)

Bishops of Itabira–Fabriciano (Roman Rite)

- Mário Teixeira Gurgel, S.D.S. (see above 1 June 1979 – 15 May 1996), retired
- Lélis Lara, C.Ss.R. (15 May 1996 – 22 January 2003), retired
- Odilon Guimarães Moreira (22 January 2003 – 21 February 2013), resigned
- Marco Aurélio Gubiotti (21 February 2013 – 8 January 2026), appointed Archbishop of Juiz de Fora, Minas Gerais

=== Coadjutor bishop ===
- Lélis Lara, C.Ss.R. (1995-1996), succeeded

=== Auxiliary bishop ===
- Lélis Lara, C.Ss.R. (1976-1995), appointed Coadjutor Bishop of Itabira–Fabriciano in 1996
