= Pedro Nolasco Street =

Street in Minas Gerais, Brazil

Coordinates: 19.5287°S 42.6232°W

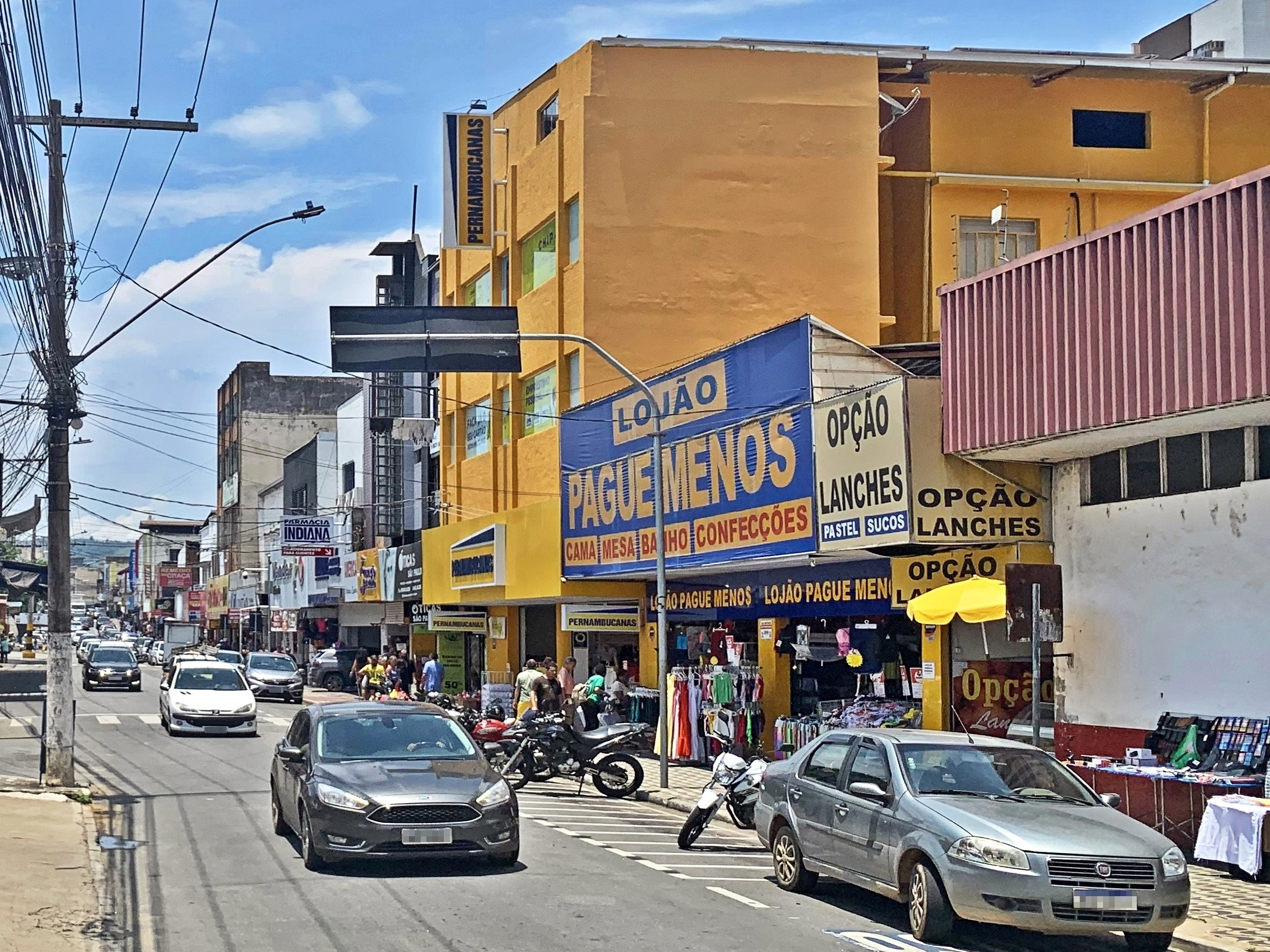
- Pedro Nolasco Street
- Former name(s): Rua de Baixo; Marechal Deodoro Street; Percival Farquhar Street
- Length: 600 meters
- Location: Coronel Fabriciano, Minas Gerais; Brazil

The Pedro Nolasco Street (Portuguese: Rua Pedro Nolasco) is located in the Brazilian municipality of Coronel Fabriciano, in the state of Minas Gerais. It begins at the intersection of Rio Piracicaba, Albert Scharlet, Doutor Querubino and Rubem Siqueira Maia streets and ends at São Sebastião Street. It originated in the 1920s when the old Calado Station was built on the site. Some of the buildings located on the street still retain their original architecture.

Paved with hexagonal blocks, Pedro Nolasco Street is the main shopping area in the center of Coronel Fabriciano. It concentrates small and medium-sized businesses and branches of large household appliance chains. The urban entrance to the bus terminal, the main stop for municipal public transport and the Station Square, which is the city's largest public leisure space, are also located on the area.

== History ==
Pedro Nolasco Street was established along with the current center of Coronel Fabriciano, which arose around Calado Station, inaugurated in 1924. The first stores that began the commercial movement were opened in the area, formerly known as Rua de Baixo (English: Lower Street). The first was A Barateza, established by Rotildino Avelino in the 1920s. In 1928, Sobrado dos Pereira (Pereira's House), which was the first masonry building in the city besides the railway terminal, was built on the corner of Coronel Silvino Pereira Street. In the 1940s, Casa Giovannini, a hardware, kerosene and grocery store, opened. Associated with the presence of the railway station, Rua de Baixo became the city's main commercial center.

In 1936, before being paved, the street housed the headquarters of Companhia Siderúrgica Belgo-Mineira, which operated in the region for decades. Later, the administrative unit of the Vitória-Minas Railway (EFVM), the first offices of the City Hall and the Court of Coronel Fabriciano, the Sete de Setembro Club (the city's first nightclub), the Banco da Lavoura (the first bank branch) and several commercial establishments were built. Rubem Siqueira Maia, the first elected mayor, paved the streets in the center of Fabriciano.

It was later renamed Marechal Deodoro Street and Percival Farquhar Street, a reference to Percival Farquhar, one of the people responsible for building the EFVM. The current name is a tribute to Pedro Augusto Nolasco Pereira, an engineer involved in the railroad project. The presence of the main bus stop for the city's urban and interurban public transport, which attracts consumers from other neighborhoods and nearby towns, promoted the commercial development of the street. In 1979, the railway station was deactivated for the construction of the bus terminal. In 2008, the Station Square was built next to it.

At the end of the 1980s, the Arglurb Project redesigned the paving of the streets in the center of Fabriciano. The old stone block paving in Pedro Nolasco Street and the main roads was replaced by hexagonal blocks. Despite the changes, the street has retained its commercial and service importance for the city.

== Main buildings ==
Besides Sobrado dos Pereira, the oldest existing buildings date from the 1940s and 1960s and some still preserve their original architecture. The Casa São Geraldo (St. Gerard's House), built in 1948, was granted by Rubem Siqueira Maia, owner and resident, to serve as the City Hall's first headquarters; it also housed a clothing store, the O Brasileirão supermarket and a branch of the Costão chain of stores. The Sobrado do Rotildino Avelino (Rotildino Avelino's House), built in 1952, served as the residence of Avelino, who donated the first image of Saint Sebastian for the construction of the city's first church in 1929. The Casa Modelo da CVRD (CVRD Model House), from the late 1960s, was built by Companhia Vale do Rio Doce (CVRD) as part of a group of residences for its workers in the city; it is the only one that has kept most of its original features.

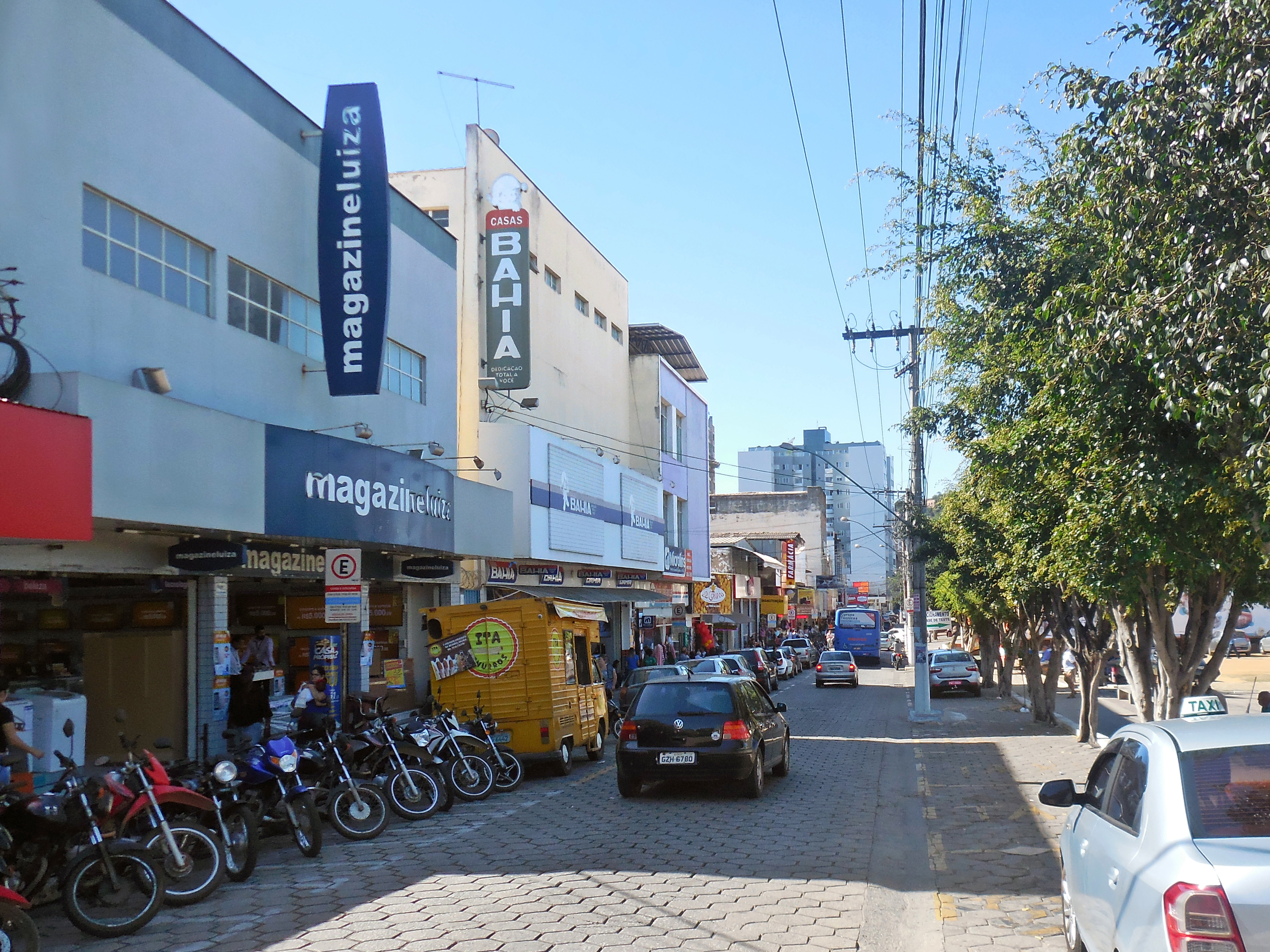
Commerce in the Pedro Nolasco Street.

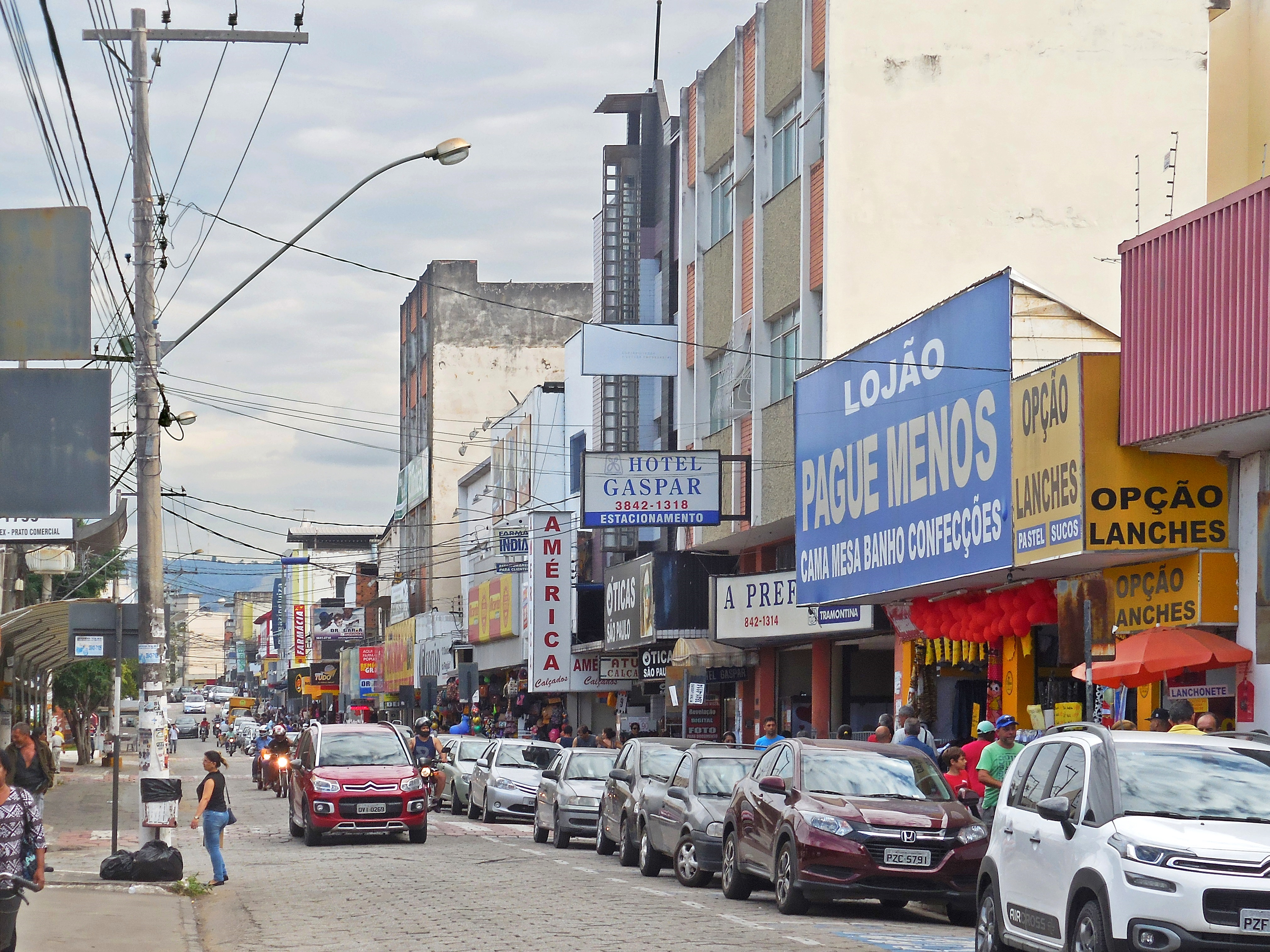
Commerce in the Pedro Nolasco Street.

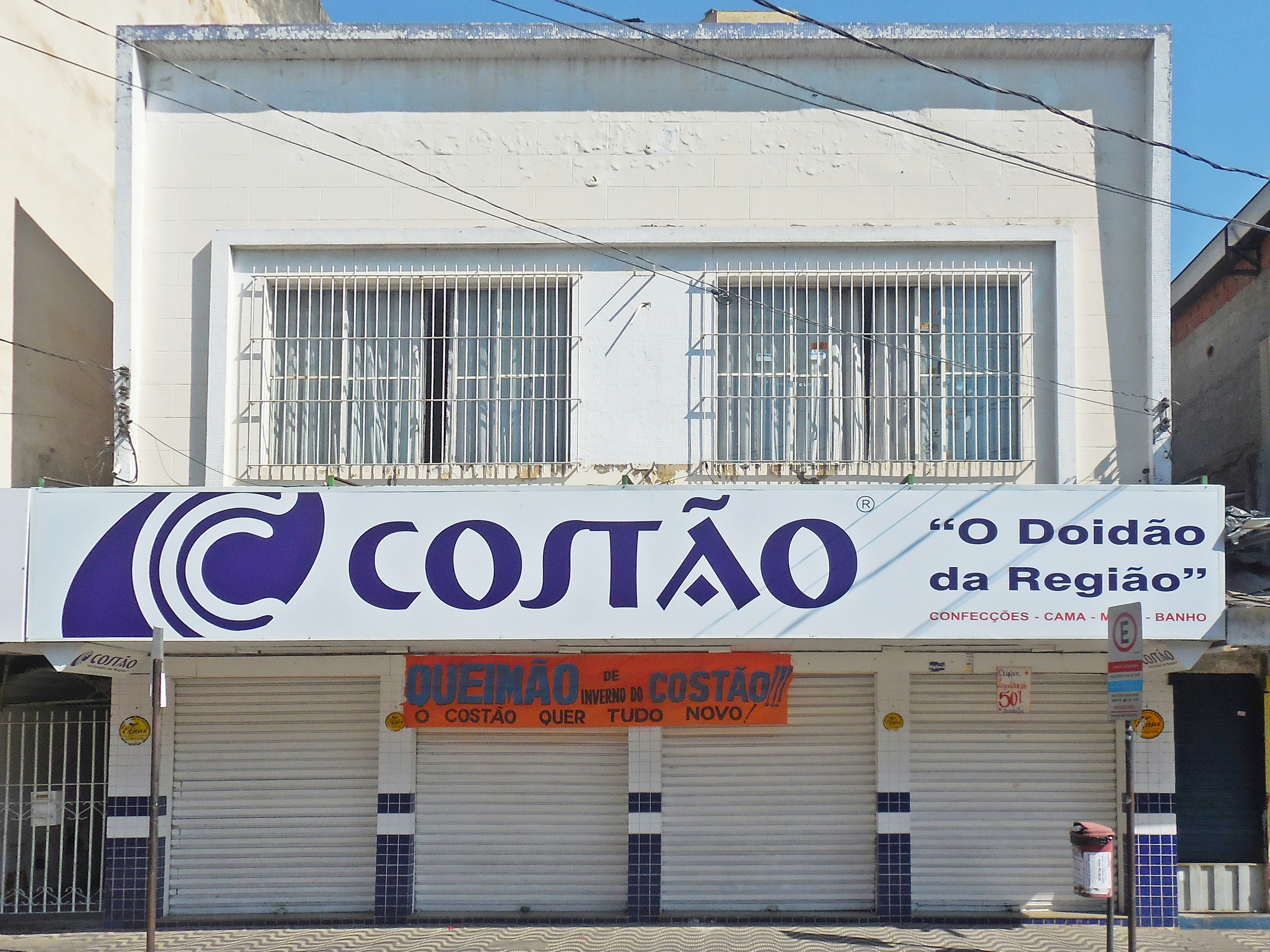
Facade of the Costão in the Casa São Geraldo.

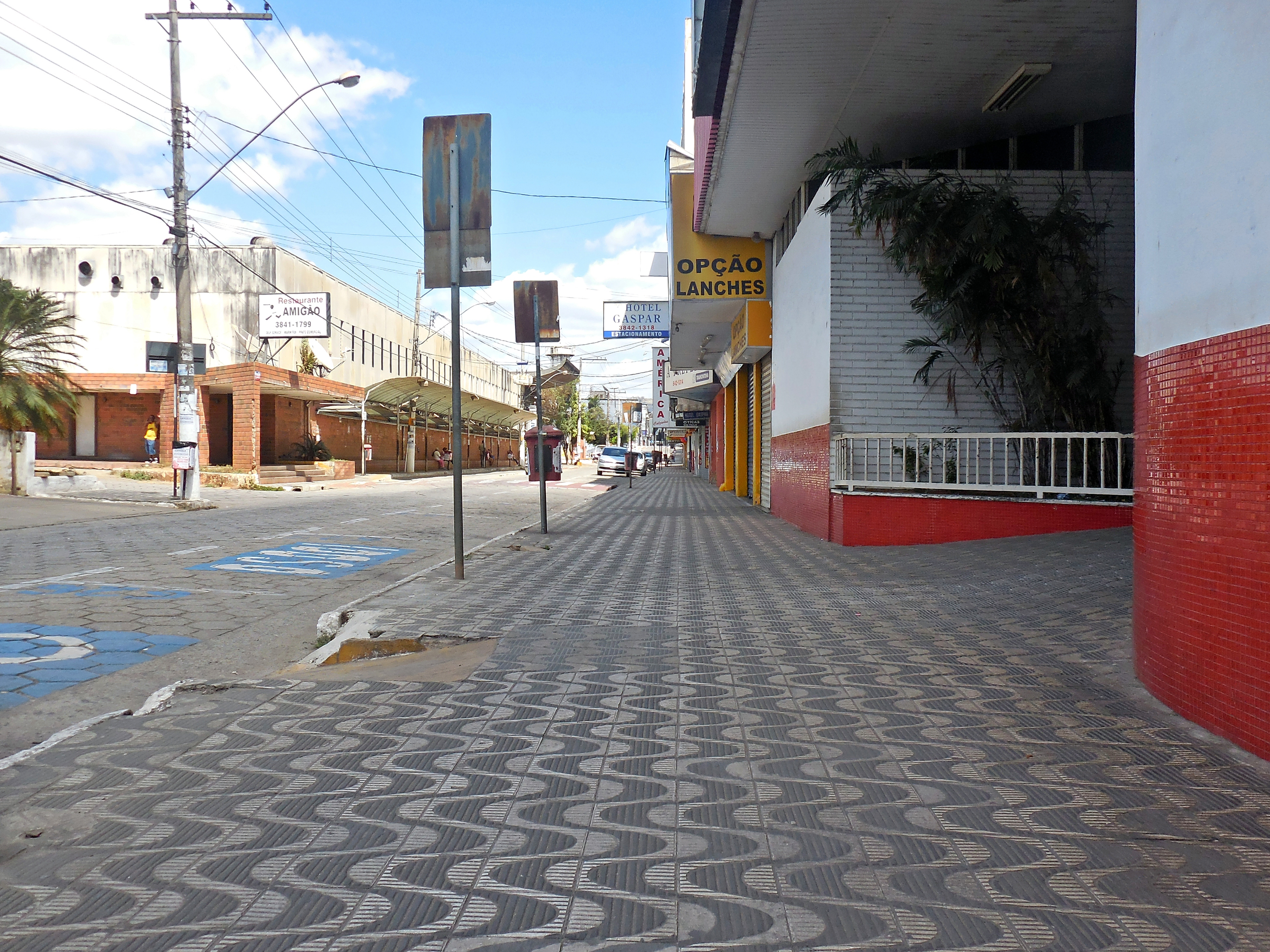
Sidewalk of the Pedro Nolasco Street on a Sunday morning.

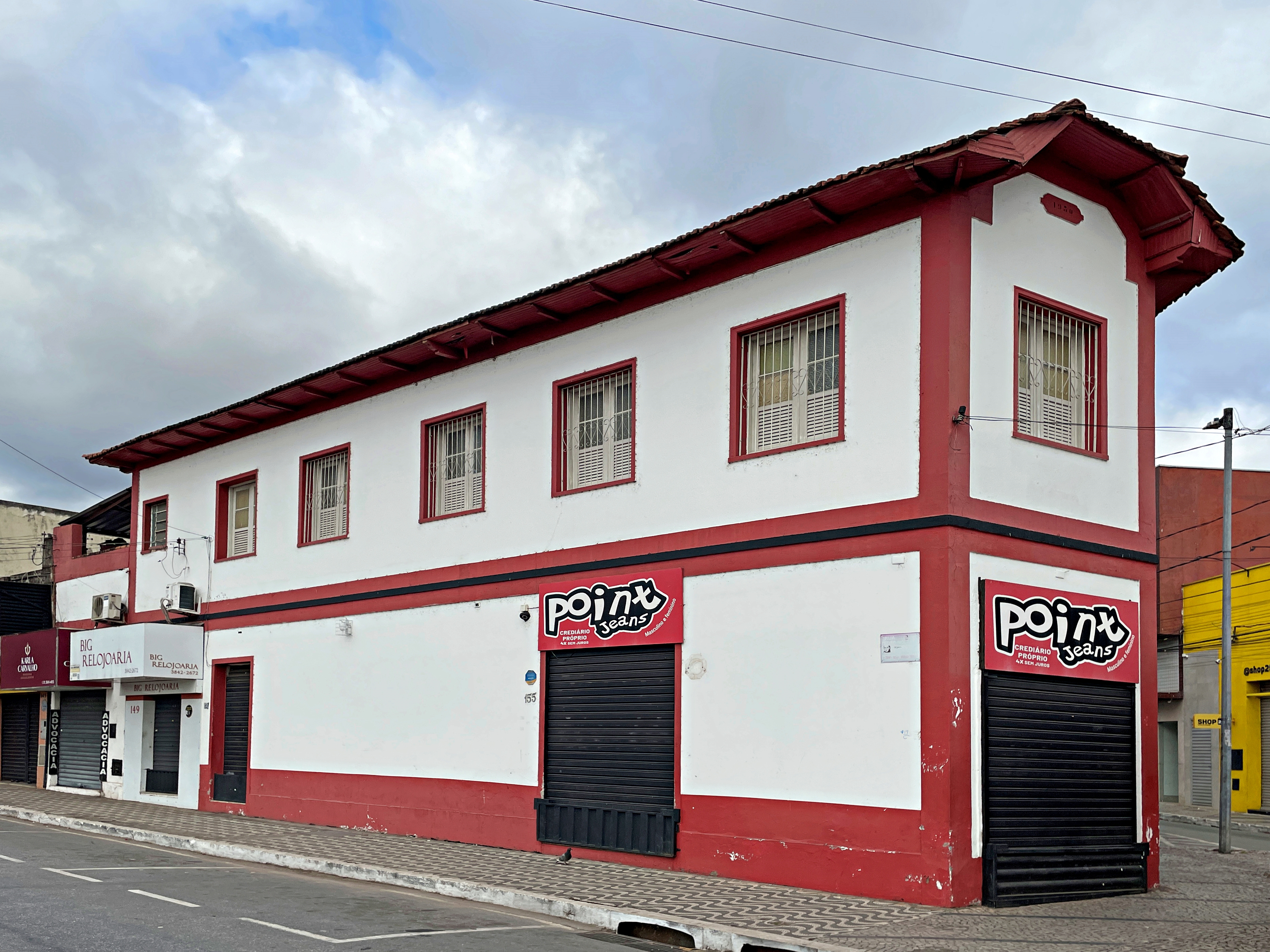
The Sobrado dos Pereira.

== See also ==
- History of Coronel Fabriciano
