= Lélis Lara =

Brazilian Roman Catholic bishop

Lélis Lara C.Ss.R.
- Bishop of Itabira–Fabriciano
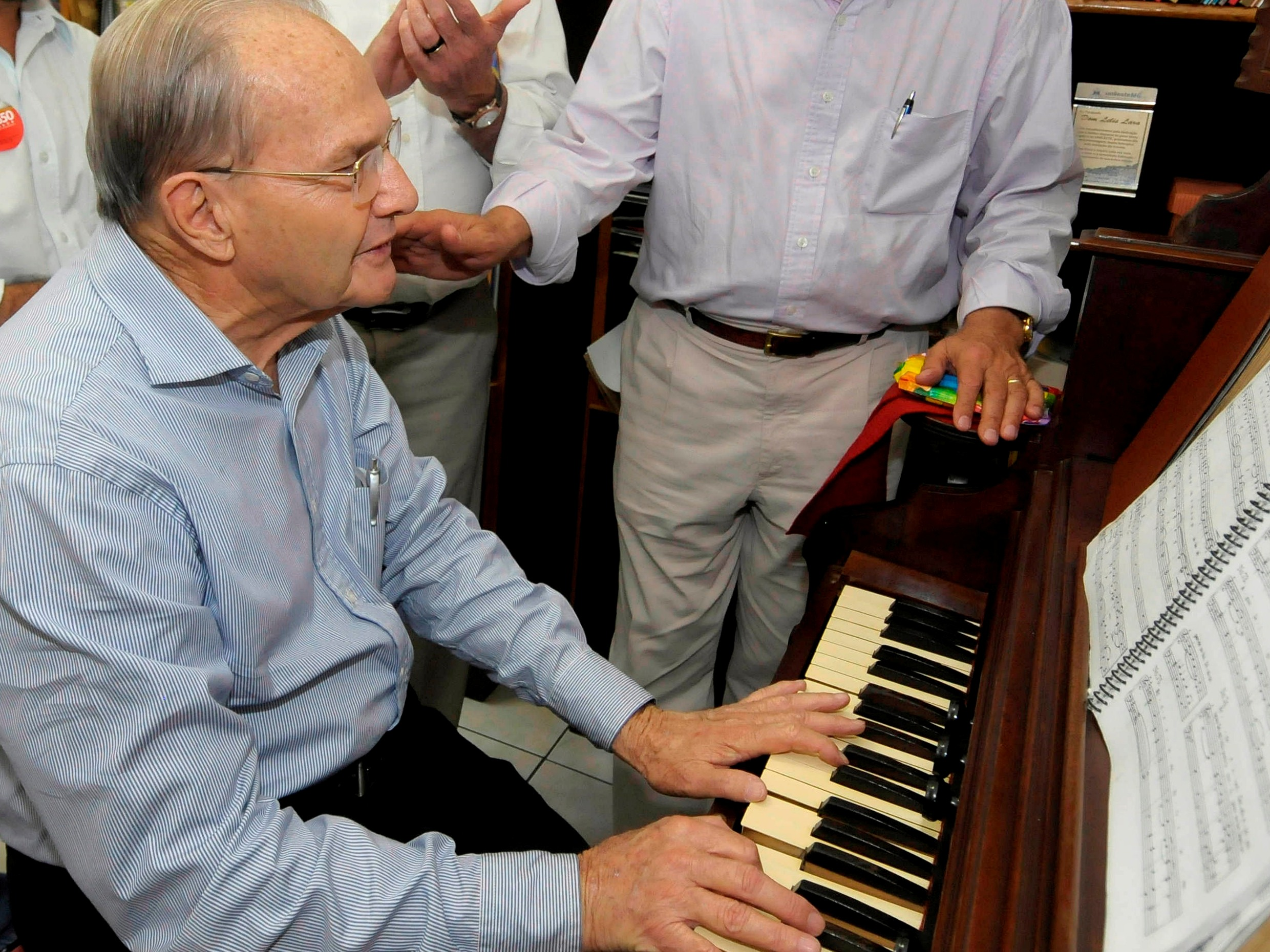
- Lélis Lara at the Redemptorist Missionaries' residence in Coronel Fabriciano in 2010
- Church: Catholic Church
- Diocese: Diocese of Itabira–Fabriciano
- In office: 15 May 1996 – 22 January 2003
- Predecessor: Mário Teixeira Gurgel
- Successor: Odilon Guimarães Moreira
- Previous posts: Coadjutor Bishop of Itabira–Fabriciano (1995-1996); Auxiliary Bishop of Itabira–Fabriciano (1979-1995); Titular Bishop of Cellae in Mauretania (1976-1995); Auxiliary Bishop of Itabira (1976-1979)

Orders
- Ordination: 2 February 1951
- Consecration: 2 February 1977 by Mário Teixeira Gurgel

Personal details
- Born: 19 December 1925 Divinópolis, Minas Gerais, Republic of the United States of Brazil
- Died: 8 December 2016 (aged 90)

Lélis Lara (19 December 1925 – 8 December 2016) was a Catholic bishop.

Ordained to the priesthood in 1959, Lara served auxiliary bishop of the Catholic Diocese of Itabira-Fabriciano, Brazil from 1976 to 1995; he then served as coadjutor bishop from 1995 to 1996 and as diocesan bishop from 1996 to 2003.
