= History of Coronel Fabriciano =

The history of Coronel Fabriciano, a Brazilian municipality in the interior of the state of Minas Gerais, began at the end of the 16th century. Expeditions followed the so-called Doce River Hinterlands ("Sertões do Rio Doce") in search of precious metals, however, the settlement of the region was forbidden at the beginning of the XVII century, to avoid smuggling of the gold extracted in the Diamantina region.

The settlement was released in 1755 and during the 19th century, the flow of troopers ("tropeiros") led to the formation of the settlement of Santo Antônio de Piracicaba in the region of the current Melo Viana and the subsequent creation of the district in 1923. On the same occasion, the town started to be served by the Vitória-Minas Railway (EFVM), and the Calado Station was built, around which the urban center that corresponds to Fabriciano's center was established. In 1936, the Belgo-Mineira Steelworks Company (ArcelorMittal) was installed, and remained there until the 1960s, strengthening the formation of an urban nucleus which culminated in the emancipation of Coronel Fabriciano on December 27, 1948.

In the 1940s and 1950s, respectively, Coronel Fabriciano hosted the industrial complexes of Acesita and Usiminas, which were essential for the development of the city. But, with the political emancipation of Timóteo and Ipatinga, in 1964, the companies were incorporated into their respective municipalities. The population growth associated with the presence of industries required the emergence of neighborhoods and housing developments. Furthermore, the maintenance of the steelmaking activity contributed to the formation of the Vale do Aço metropolitan area, ("Steel Valley") which corresponds to one of the largest urban centers in the state.

== Early colonization ==
The Monument to the Tropeiro ("Monumento ao Tropeiro"), by Antônio Bonifácio, in Santa Vitória dos Cocais, donated by Emalto in 2016, is a reference to the troopers who crossed the area since the 19th century.

The clearing of the region of the current Coronel Fabriciano municipality began in the second half of the 16th century. Expeditions such as that of Fernandes Tourinho, in 1572, followed through the so-called "Doce River hinterlands" ("Sertão do Rio Doce") in search of precious metals. The place was on an outflow route for the precious stones extracted in the central region of Minas Gerais, which linked the Estrada Real in Diamantina to the coast of Espírito Santo. However, the settlement and the opening of new trails through the Doce River Valley region were forbidden by the Portuguese crown in the first half of the 17th century, to avoid gold smuggling through the Doce River and its tributaries, such as the Piracicaba. Intended to keep outsiders away, it was said to be land with dense vegetation and poisonous animals, with the danger of the Botocudo Indians.

The settlement was liberated in 1755 after Minas Gerais went through a decline in gold production. On this same occasion, a road was opened connecting Vila Rica (now Ouro Preto, then the capital of the Province of Minas Gerais) to Cuieté, to transport the gold extracted in the region of the current municipality of Conselheiro Pena, whose metal would run out after 1780. The passage, however, continued to be used after the building of a prison in Cuieté, which received convicts for crimes along the Estrada Real. The first colonists settled in the interior of the Rio Doce Valley, associated with the transportation flow by the rivers since the existence of this road. Around 1800, Francisco Rodrigues Franco settled in the area of Fabriciano. On the same occasion, José Assis de Vasconcelos, originally from Santana do Alfié, in São Domingos do Prata, took possession of land near the current industrial core of Usiminas.

In 1825, a road was opened by Guido Marlière connecting Antônio Dias to the Santo Antônio River, near Naque, crossing the Serra dos Cocais through which later would appear the settlement of São José dos Cocais. Thus, the flow of tropeiros between the settlements, intensified throughout the 19th century, who crossed the region from Antônio Dias, Ferros, Santana do Paraíso, Mesquita, and Joanésia, led to the formation of a small settlement, later called Santo Antônio do Gambá, also known as Santo Antônio de Piracicaba, in the current Melo Viana neighborhood. The establishment of small landowners led to the development of the settlement as a function of farming and cattle raising. Coming from Leopoldina, on September 11, 1831, Francisco de Paula e Silva settled with his family and numerous slaves after receiving three sesmarias (Note: Portuguese system, adapted in Brazil, which regulated the distribution of land for agricultural production.) from Emperor Pedro II: Alegre, Limoeiro, and Timóteo. Francisco settled on the right bank of the Piracicaba River, having started the weeding of the area to facilitate trade between the neighboring population centers. He developed agriculture in the region and his farm served as a stopping point for travelers.

Soon after, Francisco Romão - a fugitive from justice-seeking refuge - became responsible for the transportation of people and goods through the Piracicaba, Doce, and Santo Antônio rivers, connecting São Domingos do Prata, Antônio Dias, Mesquita, and Joanésia. At the mouth of the Caladão Stream, there was a movement associated with the presence of a small port, where the goods transported by road embarked towards neighboring localities through the Piracicaba River. The place became known as Barra do Calado, due to the disposition between the two hydrographic courses, and the term "calado" ("quiet") is a likely reference to the silence needed to avoid drawing attention from Indians hiding in that area, still in the beginning of the 19th century.

In 1919, João Teixeira Benevides brought from Ferros the first teacher (his niece, Maria de Lourdes de Jesus) and donated land for the first school, the first cemetery, and the church of Santo Antônio de Piracicaba, observing at that time a growth of commerce and the formation of the urban nucleus. João Teixeira arrived in the village newly married to Guilhermina Ribeiro da Silva, both from Ferros, attracted by the projects of the lease of the Vitória-Minas Railway (EFVM).

== Settlement development ==
Originally, the town was part of the village of Itabira, created in 1833 when it was dismembered from Caeté and elevated to city in 1848, and in 1911 the settlement became part of Antônio Dias. In the 1920s, after the resumption of the EFVM, a population growth was observed due to the establishment of workers in Barra do Calado. Dozens of tents were improvised to shelter the workers, many of them northeasterners from Bahia and Sergipe, but other immigrants were also present. The Manoel Domingos neighborhood, for example, began to be populated in the 1910s, with the arrival of Portuguese immigrant Manoel Domingues (after whom the current neighborhood is named), who also participated in the building of the railroad. A large part of the residents who populated that area in the following years were descendants of his 28 children. Coronel Silvino Pereira, from Sergipe, was responsible for the arrival of several of the outsiders and later became a businessman and politician.

By state law No. 823 of September 7, 1923, the district was created under the name of Melo Viana, a reference to the former senator, interior secretary, and vice-president of the republic Fernando de Melo Viana. The headquarters were in Santo Antônio de Piracicaba. The Calado Station was inaugurated on June 9, 1924. Before the inauguration, the terminal remained abandoned for almost two years, due to an unexpected deviation of the railway track after crossing the current Cariru neighborhood in Ipatinga. Manoel Camilo da Fonseca was appointed as the first district justice of the peace, electing his first clerk of the peace, João Batista Pereira. The first civil registrations made were the baptism of the twin girls Duraci de Distaneta, daughters of the couple Antônio Viana, and the marriage of the Syrian Maron Abibi to Geralda Honrata de Souza.

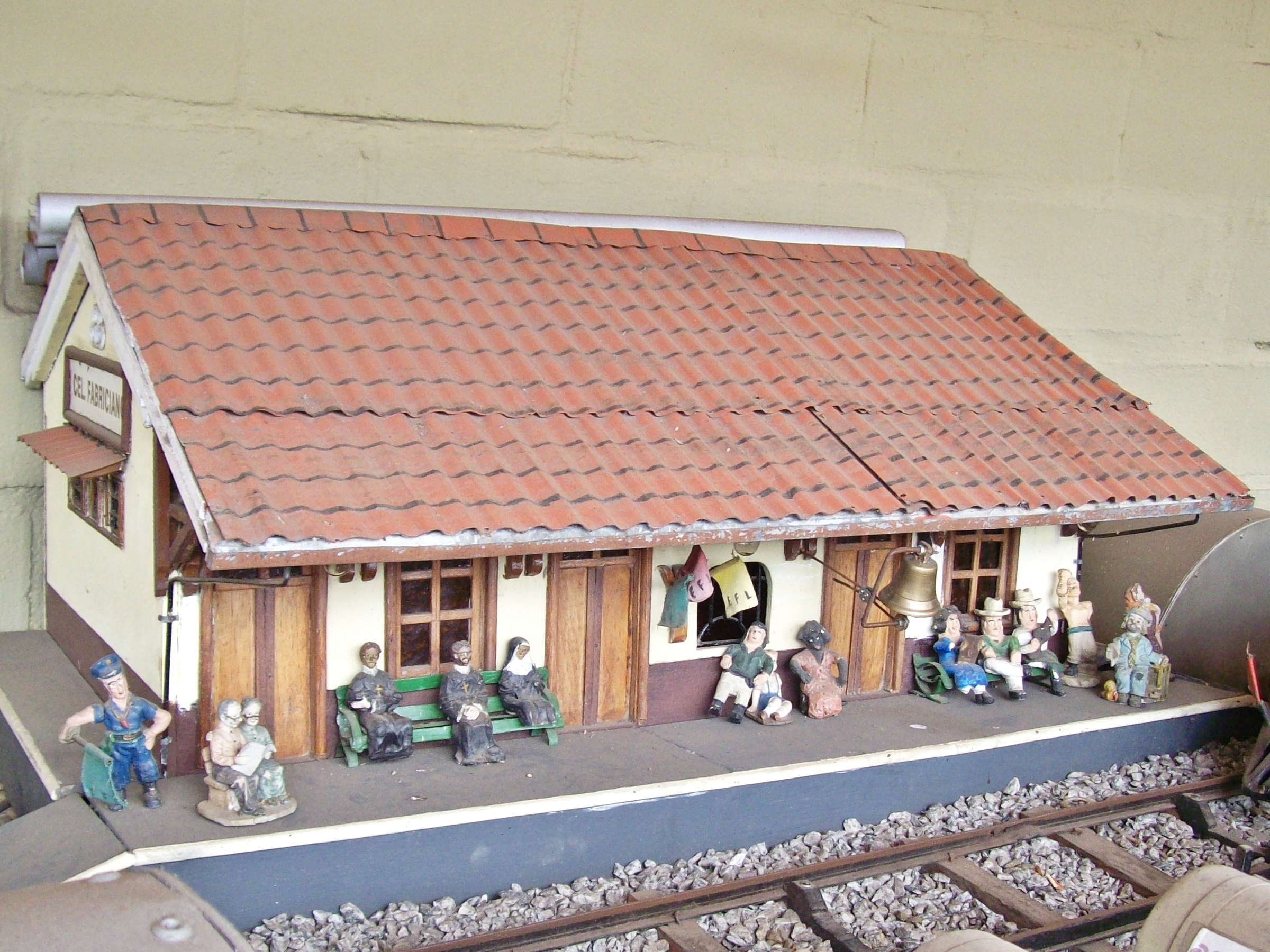
Miniature Calado Station at Saint Sebastian Cathedral.

At the same time, around the station, the first houses in Calado, the region where Coronel Fabriciano's center is, began to be built. The predominance was of small shacks, and only in 1928 was built, besides the station, the first house covered with ceramic tiles and rooming; the Sobrado dos Pereira, which still exists on the corner of the current Pedro Nolasco and Coronel Silvino Pereira streets, being also the first commercial establishment in the city. In the same year, Rotildino Avelino was elected the first councilman representing Calado, being present in the locality since 1925 as a tailor and merchant, becoming after some time a landowner and coal producer. At the time, the dead were buried in the cemetery near Santo Antônio Church, at the district's headquarters, where JK Square is located today, or even dumped on the margins of the railroad. Silvino Pereira installed the first public lighting service, supplied by a thermoelectric power plant, also providing energy to coffee, cotton, and rice processing machines in the settlement cut by the streets of Cima (formerly Seca, now Duque de Caxias) and Baixo (now Silvino Pereira and Pedro Nolasco).

In 1928, the Rural Mista School was founded, which was the first regular school, directed by teacher Mariana Roque Pires. The first church in Calado was built in 1929, dedicated to Saint Sebastian in honor of the residents' devotion. On March 1, 1930, the first elections were held, presided by Eugênio dos Santos, with Getúlio Vargas (Liberal Alliance) receiving 336 votes and Júlio Prestes (PRP) 144 votes for president of the republic. Due to the distance traveled by the then clerk José Zacarias da Silva Roque to the railroad terminal, the Melo Viana notary's office was transferred to Calado in 1933, changing the district headquarters to the region of the current city center.

== Economic Expansion ==
=== Configuration of the urban nucleus ===
In February 1936, an office of the Companhia Siderúrgica Belgo-Mineira (now ArcelorMittal Aços Longos) was set up in Calado, seeking to centralize the exploration of wood and the production of charcoal from the Doce River Valley to feed the furnaces of its plants in João Monlevade. The company, through the local superintendent, engineer Joaquim Gomes da Silveira Neto, was responsible for a great impulse to the city as an organized urban center since several streets and avenues were created and buildings erected, in particular the first masonry houses. Also in this period, the Siderúrgica Hospital (now Doutor José Maria Morais Hospital) was built, due to the high incidence of yellow fever and other tropical diseases.

Besides the shipments of wood and coal and the unloading of machinery destined for Belgo's industrial enterprise, the movement of the Calado Station was restricted to the arrival of smaller orders and foodstuffs. The lumber sector became the main economic source throughout the 1930s, also benefiting internal commercial activity, which later began to attract consumers from neighboring towns through the four daily train stops. By state decree-law no. 88 of 1938, Melo Viana was renamed Coronel Fabriciano, losing its space to the creation of the district of Timóteo on December 17 of the same year. Its name is a tribute to Fabriciano Felisberto Carvalho de Brito, who was one of the most influential politicians of Antônio Dias, having received from the Emperor of Brazil Pedro II, on August 25, 1888, the title of Lieutenant-Colonel of the National Guard for the District of Piracicaba. He was one of the responsible for the creation of the town of Antônio Dias (1911) and the District of Melo Viana (1923) through his son, Carvalho de Brito, deputy and member of the commission responsible for the administrative division of Minas Gerais.

In the early 1940s, the Casa Giovannini was established, selling hardware, kerosene, and groceries, and was one of the first large stores in the district. There was also the arrival of the Lavoura Bank, the first bank branch in the town, opened by Alberto Giovannini. On October 1, 1944, the Social Futebol Clube was officially founded, initially called Comercial, because it was composed of merchants. It was the first football team in the city and one of the first investments in leisure for the town, which then had about 3,500 inhabitants. Also noteworthy was the creation of the Nossa Senhora Auxiliadora Musical Corporation by Belgo-Mineira in 1943. There was also the beginning of the regular practice of Catholic religious manifestations of the Ash Wednesday mass (1939), Coronation of Mary (1939), theater of the Passion of Jesus, and Holy Week processions (1946) as well as the assembly of the Corpus Christi carpets (1946).

=== Emancipation ===
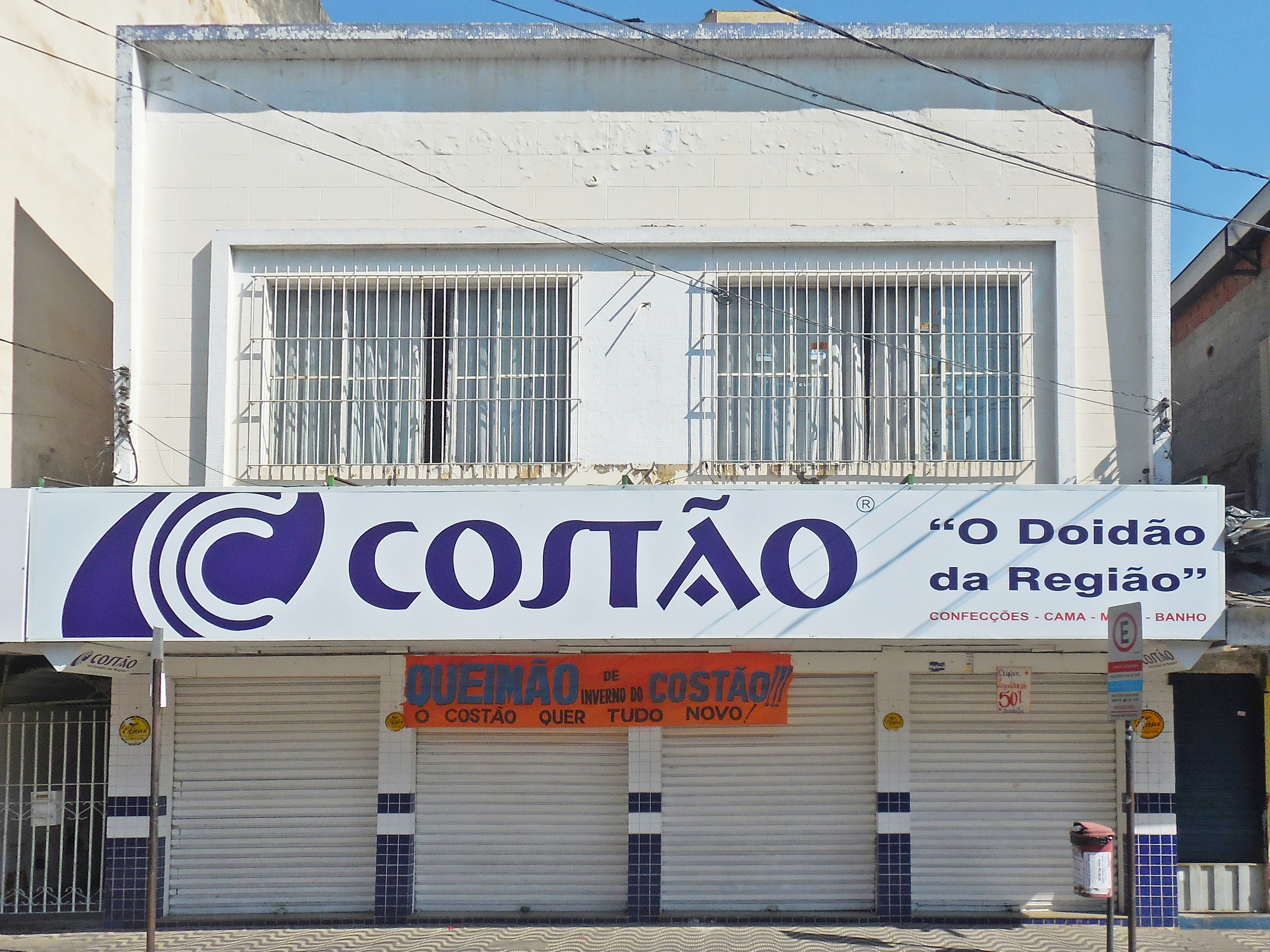
Façade of the St. Gerard House in 2017, occupied by the "Costão" chain of stores; building where the first city hall headquarters functioned.

In 1944, Acesita (now Aperam South America) was installed, driving the population and economic growth of the place with the arrival of more workers and the subsequent need for the expansion of basic services. In 1947, the former mayor Rubem Siqueira Maia structured a commission to emancipate the district, with the support of the then-state deputy Tancredo Neves, Rubem's childhood friend. Article 5 of state law No. 28 of 1947, provided that for the creation of a municipality, it should have a minimum of 10,000 inhabitants. Coronel Fabriciano, however, had about 5 thousand residents at the time, so the emancipation proposal was rejected by the Minas Gerais government.

At Tancredo Neves' suggestion, Father Deolindo Coelho provided the baptism records to be added to the number of inhabitants obtained by the census precariously carried out by the government of Antônio Dias, thus exceeding the minimum of 10 thousand residents, and a new emancipation proposal was sent to the Legislative Assembly of Minas Gerais (ALMG) on February 25, 1948. That same year saw the arrival of the first branch of a large department store, Pernambucanas, and the inauguration of Serraria Santa Helena on June 28, an enterprise that existed until the 1960s and also contributed to the structural and demographic development of the central Fabriciano region. Also in 1948, Rubem Siqueira Maia founded the first newspaper of the district: O Progresso. The periodical carried regional news and collaborated with the fomentation of political forces for the emancipation of Coronel Fabriciano to occur.

Flag of Coronel Fabriciano

The creation of the Saint Sebastian Parish, on August 15, 1948, marked the installation of the first religious institution in the Vale do Aço ("Steel Valley"). On October 8 of the same year, an opinion favorable to emancipation was issued by the Legislative Assembly of Minas Gerais, and through state law No. 336, of December 27, 1948, decreed by the governor Milton Campos, Coronel Fabriciano ceased to belong to Antônio Dias and became emancipated. This happened on January 1, 1949, consisting of the districts of Barra Alegre and Timóteo, in addition to the headquarters. The town's anniversary, however, was celebrated on January 20, in honor of the town's patron saint, Saint Sebastian. On the same day, the intendant Antônio Gonçalves Gravatá was sworn in, to structure the administration of the government until the first election was held, in March of the same year. Thus, on March 15, 1949, the first elected mayor Rubem Siqueira Maia, the deputy mayor Silvino Pereira and the councilmen Nicanor Ataíde, Lauro Pereira, Ary Barros, José Anatólio Barbosa, Wenceslau Martins Araújo, Sebastião Mendes Araújo, José Paula Viana, Raimundo Martins Fraga, and José Wilson Camargo took office.

== After Emancipation ==
By State Law No. 1039 of December 12, 1953, the district of Ipatinga was created, whose development was primarily due to the Belgo-Mineira and Acesita charcoal works and the building of the Salto Grande Hydroelectric Plant, located in the municipality of Braúnas. The raw material used for the complex arrived by trucks or by the EFVM, where it was stored and gradually transported to the dam. The locality, with about 300 inhabitants and 60 houses in the year 1958, attracted little attention from the headquarters until the end of the 1950s. In this period, a new industrial nucleus was being formed with the creation of Usiminas. However, the emancipation of Ipatinga and Timóteo was decreed by state law No. 2764 of December 30, 1962, and made official on April 29, 1964, which included the territories of the industries. Thus, the industrial complexes of Usiminas and Acesita became part of these municipalities, respectively.

Despite the dismemberment, most workers of the steel companies continued to live in Coronel Fabriciano, while tax revenues and most of the social actions promoted by the industries were destined only to neighboring cities, which hosted them. Because of this, Fabriciano lacked the resources and structure to promote the necessary public policies, and the urban growth observed in the following years was not accompanied by economic and social development. With the scarcity of wood and the subsequent decline of logging, commerce came to represent almost exclusively the only source of municipal income from the 1960s onwards. In 1970, the population reached 41,120 inhabitants, rising to 75,701 residents in 1980 and 87,439 people in 1990, according to the Brazilian Institute of Geography and Statistics (IBGE). In 2003, the city reached the 100,000 inhabitants mark, with 103,694 residents according to the 2010 census data.

=== Administrative evolution ===
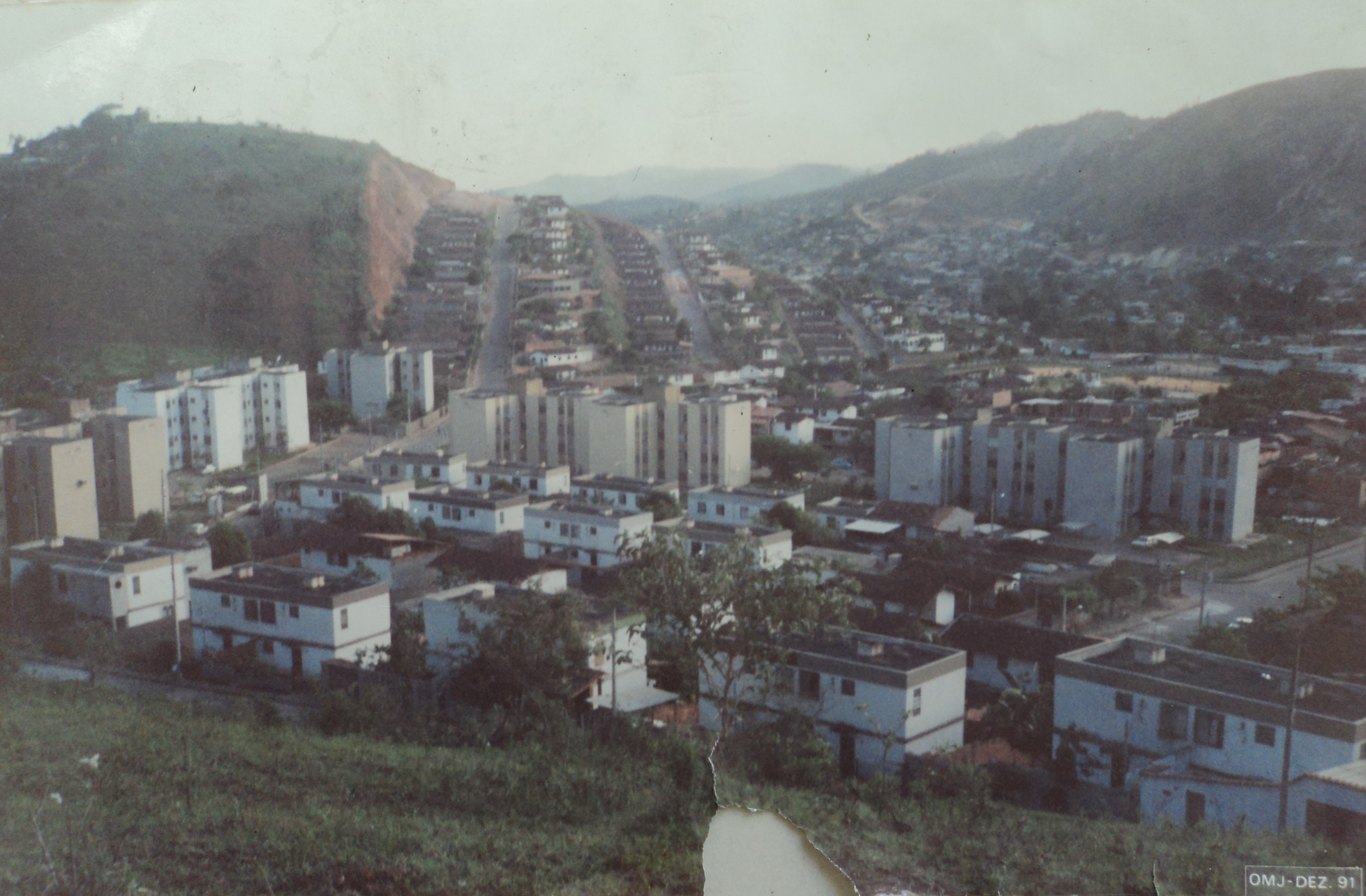
Floresta neighborhood in 1991.

By the same law No. 1039 of 1962, Barra Alegre became part of Ipatinga and the district Senador Melo Viana was created, a region that had seen a new cycle of development due to commercial activity. The emancipation of Senador Melo Viana was originally intended and a bill even proposed the elevation of the locality to the category of municipality, but the desired result was not achieved, having achieved only the creation of the district. In the 1960s, neighborhoods and housing developments emerged from subdivisions in areas that had previously been occupied by farms and ranches.

Much of Fabriciano's land (where neighborhoods such as Giovannini, Júlia Kubitschek, São Domingos, Bom Jesus, and Santa Cruz are located) belonged to the Archdiocese of Mariana until the mid-1960s. Amaro Lanari, in contrast, is one of the few planned neighborhoods in the city, having been designed by Usiminas to house the workers of this company between the 1950s and 1960s. The lands comprising the Santa Terezinha, Santa Terezinha II, Aldeia do Lago, Mangueiras, and Ponte Nova neighborhoods were owned by former mayor Rubem Siqueira Maia, who kept the so-called Santa Teresinha Farm in the locality, which was allotted in the 1960s.

Also in the 1960s, the Caladinho neighborhood region emerged, cut by the MG-4 highway, formerly BR-381, which passed within the municipal urban perimeter through Avenida Presidente Tancredo de Almeida Neves until it was municipalized in early 2010, when the extension under federal concession was transferred to outside the urban perimeter, within the municipality of Timóteo.

The neighborhoods far from the first housing nuclei were formed more recently, such as Recanto Verde, São Vicente, Santa Rita and Floresta, created in the 1980s; and Caladão, Contente, Santa Inês, Silvio Pereira I and Silvio Pereira II, in the 1990s.

Between 2018 and 2019, the construction of 788 housing units occurred through an agreement with Caixa Econômica Federal, 500 of them in the São Vicente neighborhood and 288 in Contente. This was the largest public housing project in the city since the creation of Sílvio Pereira I and Sílvio Pereira II, in the 1980s. The end of the 2010s was also marked by the direction of a new axis of urban growth in the region between the Caladinho and Sílvio Pereira II neighborhoods.

=== Politics ===
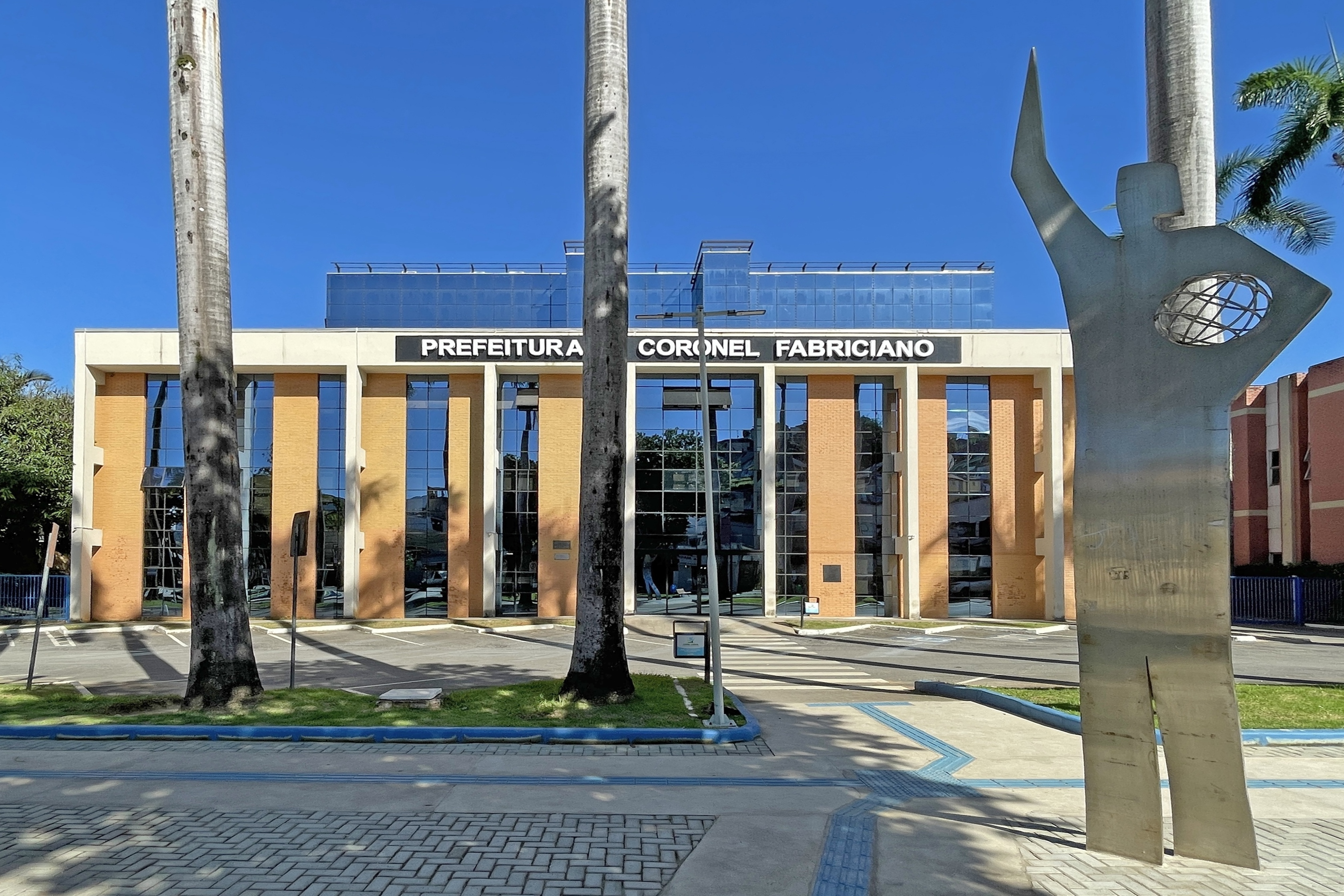
João Sotero Bragança Building, the City Hall from 1969 to 2021, when the office was transferred to the Paço Municipal (visible in the background).

The first city hall headquarters functioned in the so-called Casa São Geraldo, built by Rubem Siqueira Maia in 1948. It is located in downtown Fabriciano and is occupied by a chain store on Rua Pedro Nolasco. The politician (Maia) lived upstairs and rented the property when he was elected the first mayor, in 1949, and the place also served as a stage for parties and public events. In 1961, the seat of the Executive was moved to the Sobrado do Armazém, located at the end of Rua Coronel Silvino Pereira, but in 1969 it began to function in its building at Louis Ensch Square, the so-called João Sotero Bragança Building. Behind this the Paço Municipal was built, which became the seat of the government after the inauguration of the new building on April 30, 2021.

The headquarter of the City Council of Coronel Fabriciano was completely consumed by a fire in 1988, causing several changes of (temporary) headquarters in the following years. However, in 2020, the project to build its headquarters for the City Council of Coronel Fabriciano in the Santa Helena neighborhood was initiated. The County of Coronel Fabriciano, in turn, was installed on April 3, 1955, and its forum existed in a rented building until 1966 when it was transferred to the Doutor Louis Ensch Forum, whose name honored the former president of the local branch of ArcelorMittal. In 1999, the building was re-inaugurated and renamed the Forum Doutor Orlando Milanez, in honor of the city's first public prosecutor and because other public buildings already bear the name "Dr. Louis Ensch."

There are no records of extreme violence in the political history of Coronel Fabriciano, the only scandal being the buying of votes and exchange of packed lunches for votes between the 1950s and 1960s. Even with the emancipation processes of Ipatinga and Timóteo, in 1962, there was little that could be done in the face of strong pressure from politicians and businessmen from the former districts.

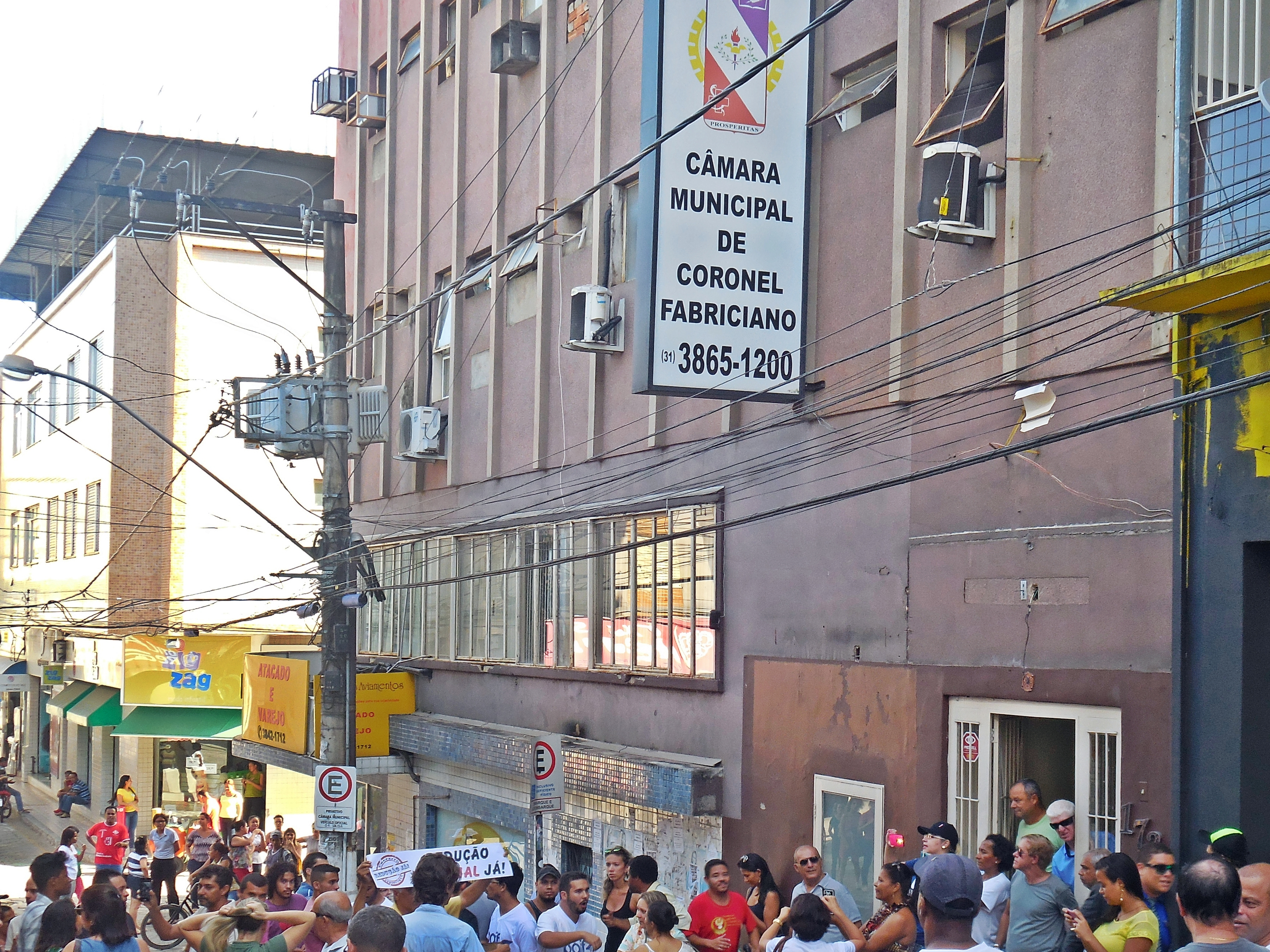
Protest in front of the City Council against salary increase for councilors in 2017.

The Ipatinga Massacre, however, which occurred on October 7, 1963, in the district that was about to be emancipated, marked the peak of the repression by the State. The massacre occurred against the Usiminas working class in search for better work conditions. On this date, thousands of striking workers were in front of the gates of the Usiminas steel mill, stripped by a heavy search the day before, in which milk and food could not be taken home, leading the Military Police armed with machine guns in trucks to open fire on the workers. An estimated 8 to 80 were dead and some 3,000 wounded. A three-day rebellion ensued, with the destruction of the local police station, the public jail, and company property.

Before the 1964 coup, the most representative parties in Coronel Fabriciano were the Social Democratic Party (PSD), the National Democratic Union (UDN), and the Brazilian Labor Party (PTB).

In the 2012 elections, the first female mayor - Rosângela Mendes - was elected, who also continued another four of twelve consecutive years of Workers' Party (PT) mandates at the head of the city government. On June 20, 2013, about 3,000 people walked the entire Avenida Magalhães Pinto to the city center, extending to the Caladinho neighborhood region, as part of the protests in Brazil that year. The main claim at the municipal level was the sluggishness of public works. In the 2016 elections, the victory of Marcos Vinícius da Silva Bizarro (PSDB), reaffirmed with his reelection in the 2020 election with 83.75% approval, put an end to the sequence of PT mandates in the mayor's office.

=== Logistical and economic growth ===
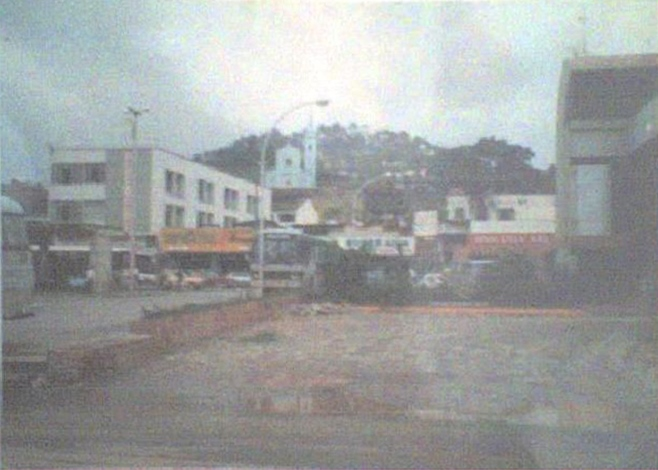
View of downtown Fabriciano from the Bus Terminal in 1991

Initially, public transportation within the municipality was the responsibility of the bus companies Açofino and Silvânia. Both maintained the Fabriciano-Acesita line, connecting the city to the company's industrial core, while the transport made available by Usiminas for the transportation of its workers was at first precarious and irregular, made through pau de arara trucks (improvised for transporting people). The current Pedro Nolasco Street, which already represented the main commercial center of the city, favored by the stops of the EFVM passenger trains that brought hundreds of consumers from other cities every day, was also established as the main stop for the urban and interurban public transportation buses. In the 1950s, the first cab services appeared, many of which transported Acesita's directors and were concentrated at points near the railway station.

In the mid-1960s, many bus companies were created, that became responsible for connecting the central region, Melo Viana and Caladinho; Coronel Fabriciano, Ipatinga and Timóteo. Univale was created in 1991, interconnecting the municipalities of Vale do Aço. Until the construction of MG-4 in the 1950s, later annexed to BR-381, access to João Monlevade was via a dirt road that passed through Dionísio, with a total length of 100 km, compared to 60 km after the opening of the highway.

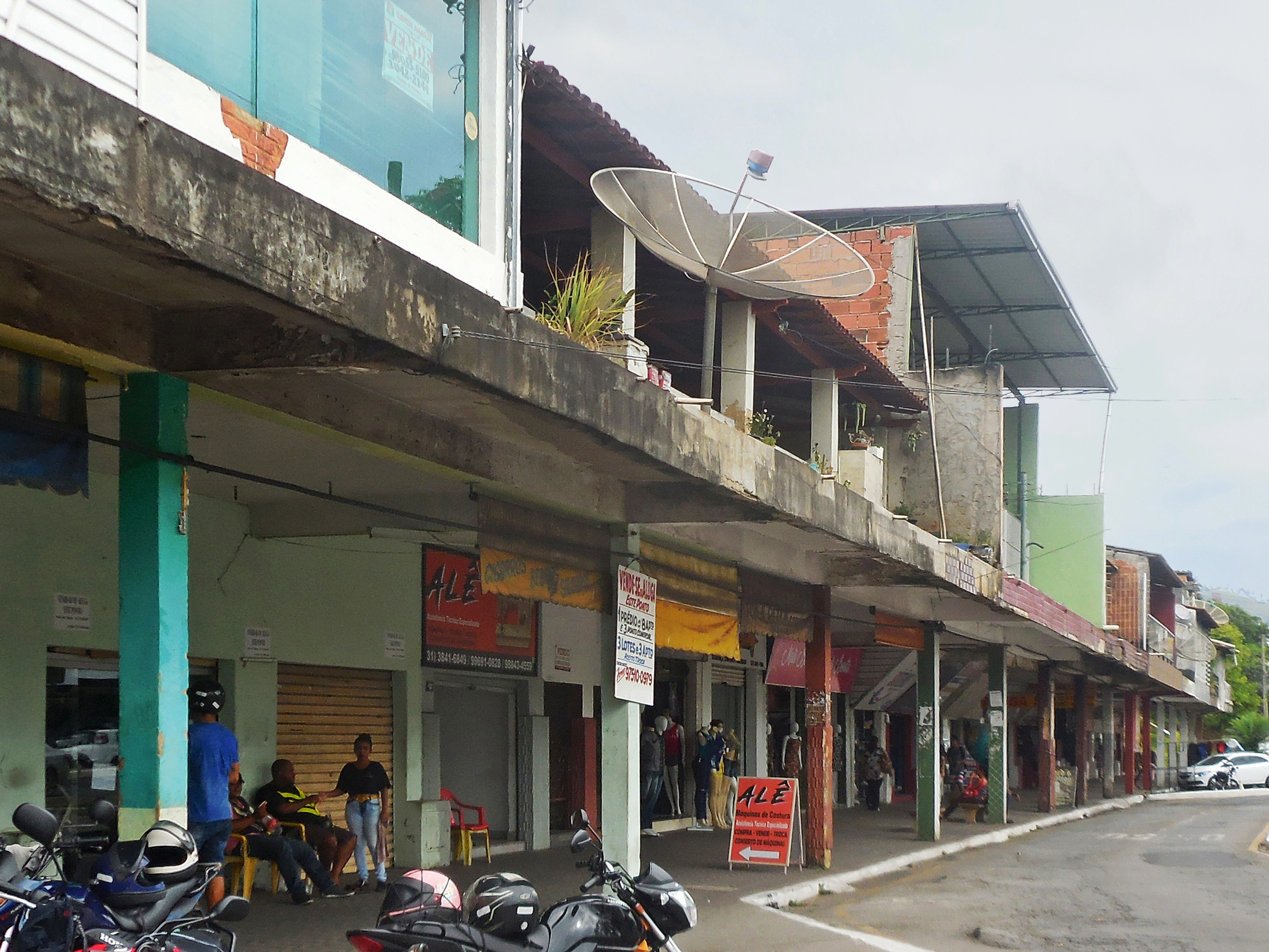
Stores in the old bus terminal, the so-called Old Bus Station ("Rodoviária Velha").

The "old bridge" over the Piracicaba River, which was built in 1947 and belonged to the BR-381, was for a long time the only connection to neighboring Timóteo. In 2005, the Mariano Pires Pontes Bridge was inaugurated, connecting Fabriciano's Center to the neighboring municipality. At that time the increase in the automobile fleet implied the need to create roads and increase the availability of parking lots. In the 1950s, the city's first bus terminal was built, located in the Giovannini neighborhood, in an area donated by Alberto Giovannini. With the growing commercial and population development of the center, it was necessary to move the Vitória a Minas Railroad from the area, and with that, the Calado Station was closed on January 29, 1979, and demolished a few years later. At the site, the new Bus Terminal was inaugurated in September 1988.

In 1958, the Commercial, Industrial and Services Association of Coronel Fabriciano (ACICEL) was created and, complementing its activities, the Chamber of Shopkeepers (CDL) was created in 1963. The effervescence of commerce in the central region culminated, as of the 1990s, in the exhaustion of lots and properties for sale and the subsequent overvaluation of real estate in surrounding neighborhoods, such as Santa Helena, Professores and Todos os Santos. Consequently, commercial and residential investors increasingly migrated to the neighborhoods of the Senador Melo Viana district, which started to show higher growth rates than the city. From then on there was a considerable increase in business activity in the inner city neighborhoods.

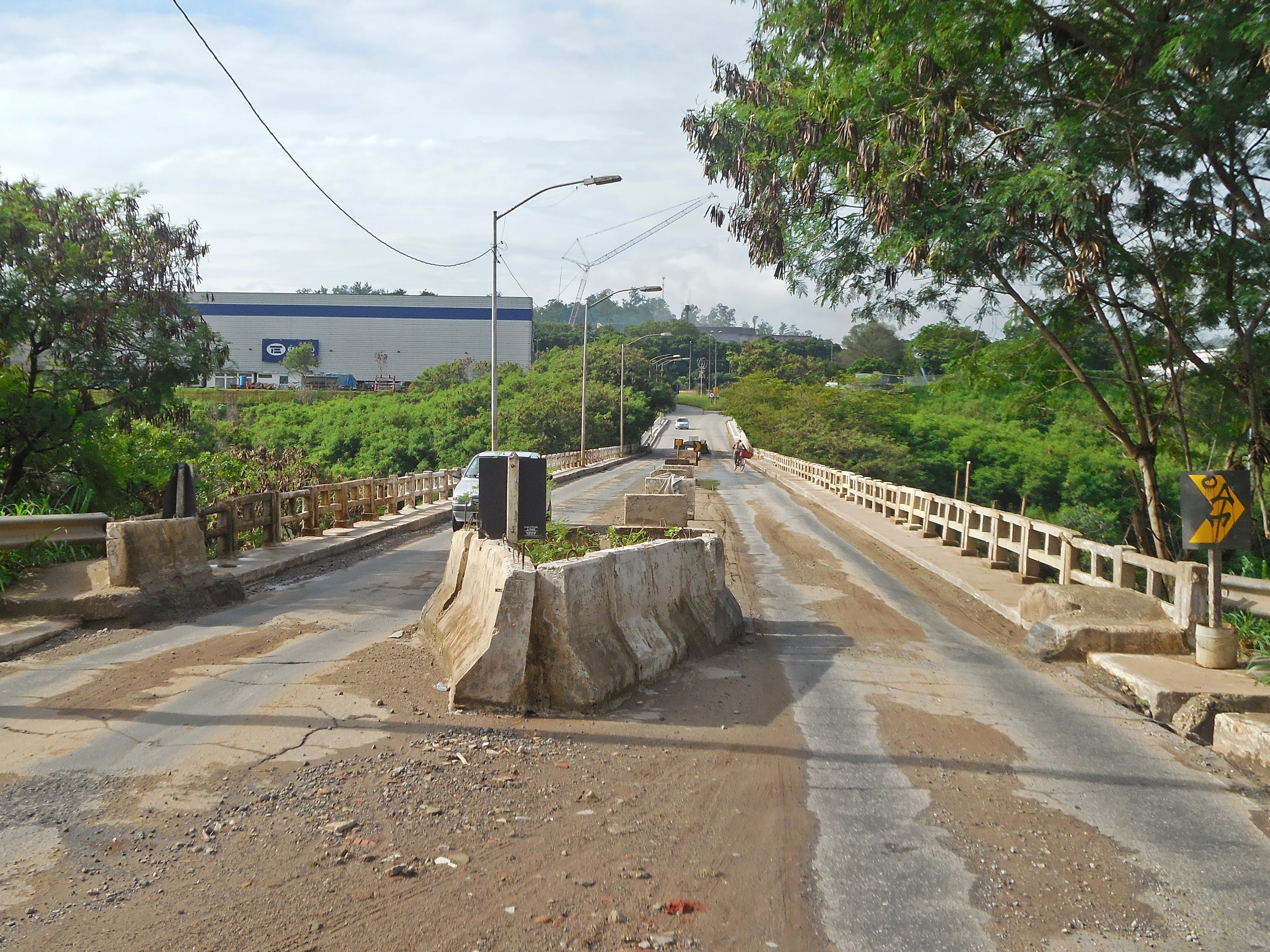
The "old bridge" blocked for heavy vehicles in 2018.

In 1995, the first companies were installed in the Industrial District, in the Belvedere neighborhood, initially comprising around 40 companies from different branches and a total area of 182,970 m^{2}, later restructured by the Minas Gerais State Economic Development Company (Codemig). At the beginning of the 21st century, the discovery of precious and semi-precious stones, such as aquamarine, tourmaline, quartz, topaz, garnet, and graphite, made it possible to start and legalize mineral extraction in the municipality. With the strong growth of the region, the political boundaries between the municipalities became ineffective, and in 1998, the Vale do Aço ("Steel Valley") was formed, which was elevated to the category of metropolitan region on January 12, 2006, involving Coronel Fabriciano and the cities of Ipatinga, Santana do Paraíso and Timóteo, besides the other 24 municipalities of the metropolitan ring. The maintenance of the steelmaking activity contributed to the creation of the metropolitan region, which corresponds to one of the main urban poles of the state, although commerce and services remain the main economic sources in Coronel Fabriciano.

In the 2010s, the city faced difficulties with the blocking of the old bridge over the Piracicaba River, on the border with Timóteo. On November 8, 2012, the structure was interdicted after the National Department of Transportation Infrastructure (DNIT) found cracks in the foundation of one of the pillars. The road was cleared for light vehicles in April 2013, but concrete blocks were placed at the headlands and in the center to prevent trucks and buses from passing. Since then renovations or even rebuilding began to be speculated, but only in December 2017, after two failed bids, did the latter win a bid. The bridge reopened and was cleared for regular traffic on January 20, 2020.

=== Infrastructure and communications ===
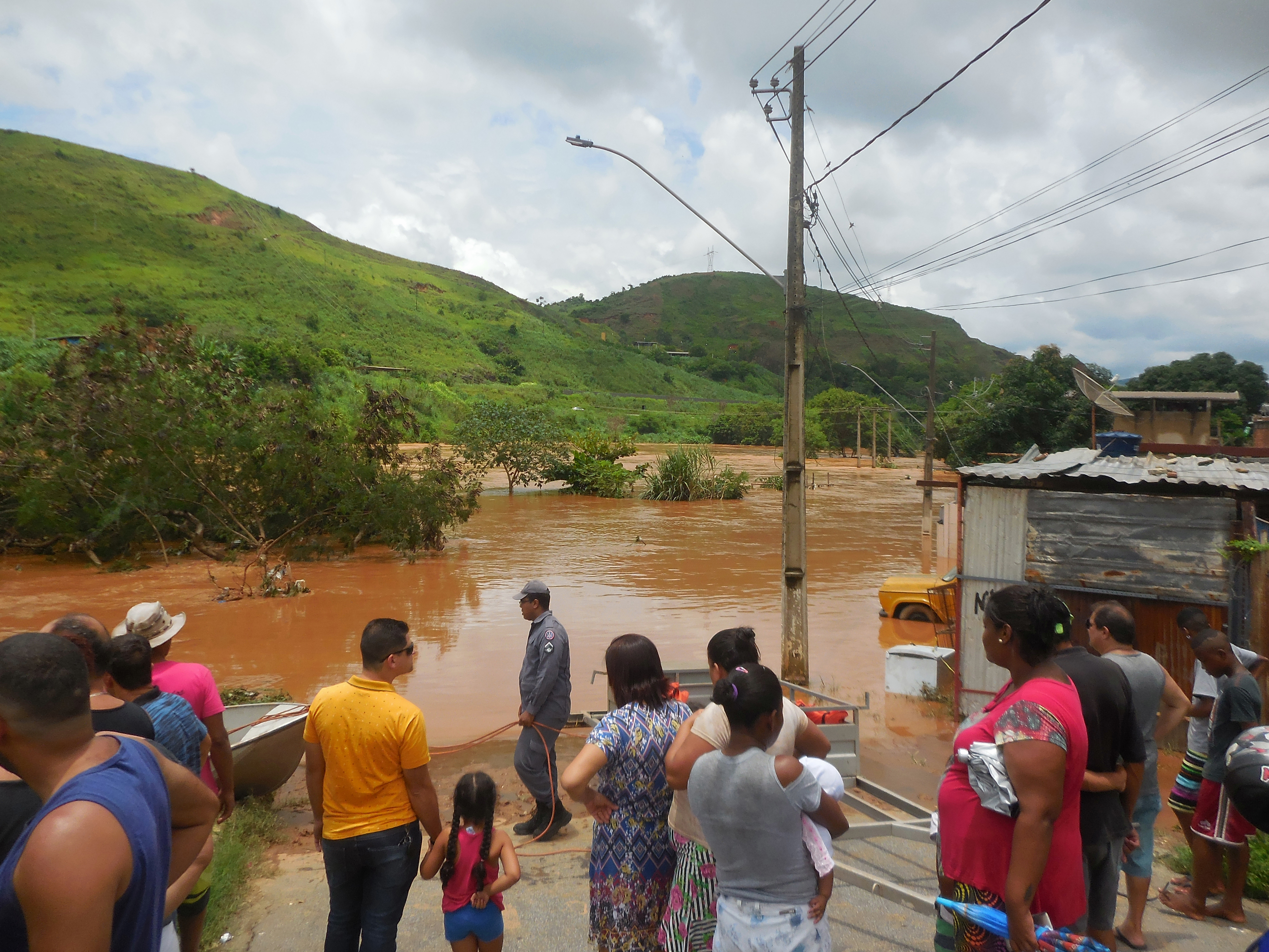
Flooding of the Piracicaba River at Prainha after heavy rains in January 2020

The unbridled population growth contrasted by the dismemberment of the industrial areas of Aperam South America (former Acesita) and Usiminas, which were responsible for the receipt of tax revenues and social actions, culminated in an urban growth of the municipality that was not accompanied by economic and social development. Between the late 1960s and early 1970s, the occupation of the so-called Morro do Carmo was observed, after the distribution of lots to the population without assessments or technical criteria by the mayor Rufino da Silva Neto, leading to the formation of irregular housing and living conditions in the city.

According to statistics from the Brazilian Institute of Geography and Statistics (IBGE), in 2010, 19.7% of the population lived in slums, approximately 21 thousand inhabitants, being the largest portion of inhabitants living in such conditions among the municipalities of Minas Gerais. In the rainy season, due to intense precipitation, landslides on the hills and floods on the banks of the water courses became common in areas such as Prainha, in the Center of Fabriciano, and in lower parts of the Mangueiras and Manoel Domingos neighborhoods. Tragedies such as the 1979 floods, which flooded a large part of the urban perimeter due to the overflowing Piracicaba river; the December 15, 2005 storms, which caused floods and landslides throughout the city and left it in a state of emergency; the 2013 rain season, with floods and mudslides that displaced dozens of people and left neighborhoods and entire streets covered in mud; and the floods of January 2020, with a balance of 420 residents displaced, three homeless and one dead, show that the city is still subject to the forces of nature.

Since the 1960s, electricity has been provided by the Companhia Energética de Minas Gerais (Cemig), which supplied more than 99% of the municipality at the beginning of the 21st century. Also in the 1960s, the Companhia de Saneamento de Minas Gerais (Copasa) became responsible for water supply and sewage collection. The agency inaugurated in September 2001 the Coronel Fabriciano water treatment station, located in the Amaro Lanari neighborhood, where since then the water supplied to the city and a vast part of the Vale do Aço Metropolitan area is extracted and treated.

On March 18, 1968, Rádio Educadora was created, the first radio station in Fabriciano and the entire Vale do Aço area, initially having only amplitude modulation (AM). Among the periodicals, besides the newspaper O Progresso (1948), which was the first to be created in the then district of Coronel Fabriciano and collaborated with the fomentation of political force, there were also O Programa (1954), A Verdade Impressa (1962), O Ipatinga (1963), O Vale do Aço (1967), Diário da Manhã (1969) and O Popular (1973). On September 16, 1978, the Diário do Aço was created in the city, which later became headquartered in Ipatinga and became one of the main newspapers in the region. As for television stations, the most successful one locally is InterTV dos Vales, created in 2007 as an affiliate of RecordTV, later becoming affiliated with TV Globo in 2008.

=== Health ===
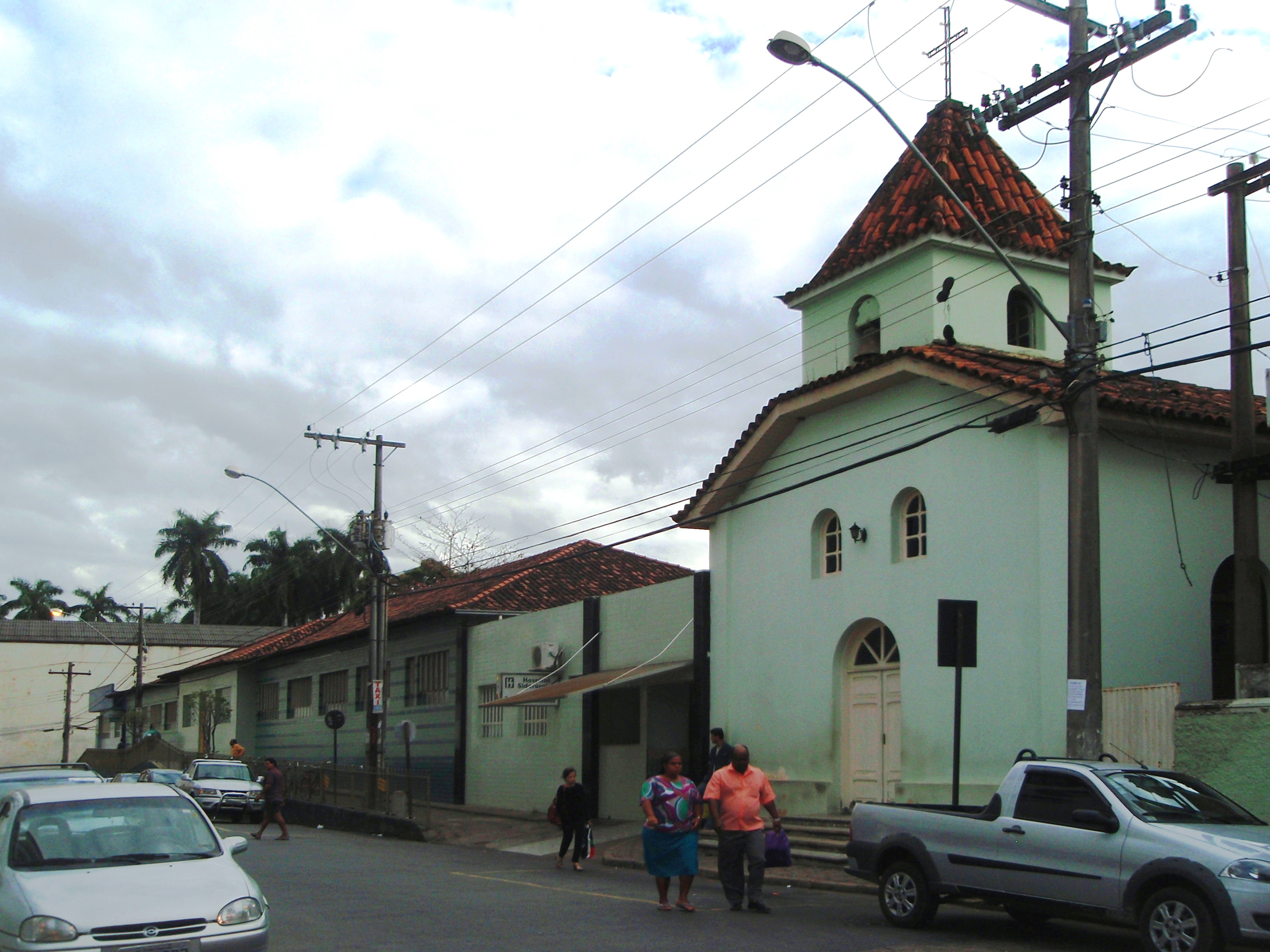
Siderúrgica Hospital in July 2010, before it underwent renovations and became the Doutor José Maria Morais Hospital.

Due to the dense forest and the climate, the incidence of tropical diseases was common in the region, leading to the opening of the first hospital, the Siderúrgica Hospital, built in the 1930s. Until 1960, its administration was the responsibility of the Catholic congregation Sisters of Our Lady of Sorrows. After victimizing thousands of people in the region, malaria was eradicated at the end of the 1940s, at the same time that a tuberculosis epidemic was emerging. Diarrhea was also constant since there was no drinkig water.

In the early 1960s, the former district clerk, José Zacarias Roque, promoted the creation of a cemetery on the banks of the Piracicaba River, but the project was disapproved by the mayor Raimundo Alves de Carvalho due to the proximity to the old bohemian area. The building of the current Senhor do Bonfim Municipal Cemetery was then arranged in an area donated by Alberto Giovannini. The privately owned Vale da Saudade Cemetery is the city's other cemetery and was built between 2000 and 2006, located in the Todos os Santos neighborhood. In June 1960, the Nossa Senhora do Carmo Hospital was inaugurated, initially Casa de Saúde Nossa Senhora do Carmo. It was one of the main public hospitals in the region, alongside Siderúrgica, and was administered for decades by Carmelite Sisters. In 2004, however, it was taken over by the Unimed network and named Unimed Hospital Vale do Aço, and since then it serves only the population with health insurance plans.

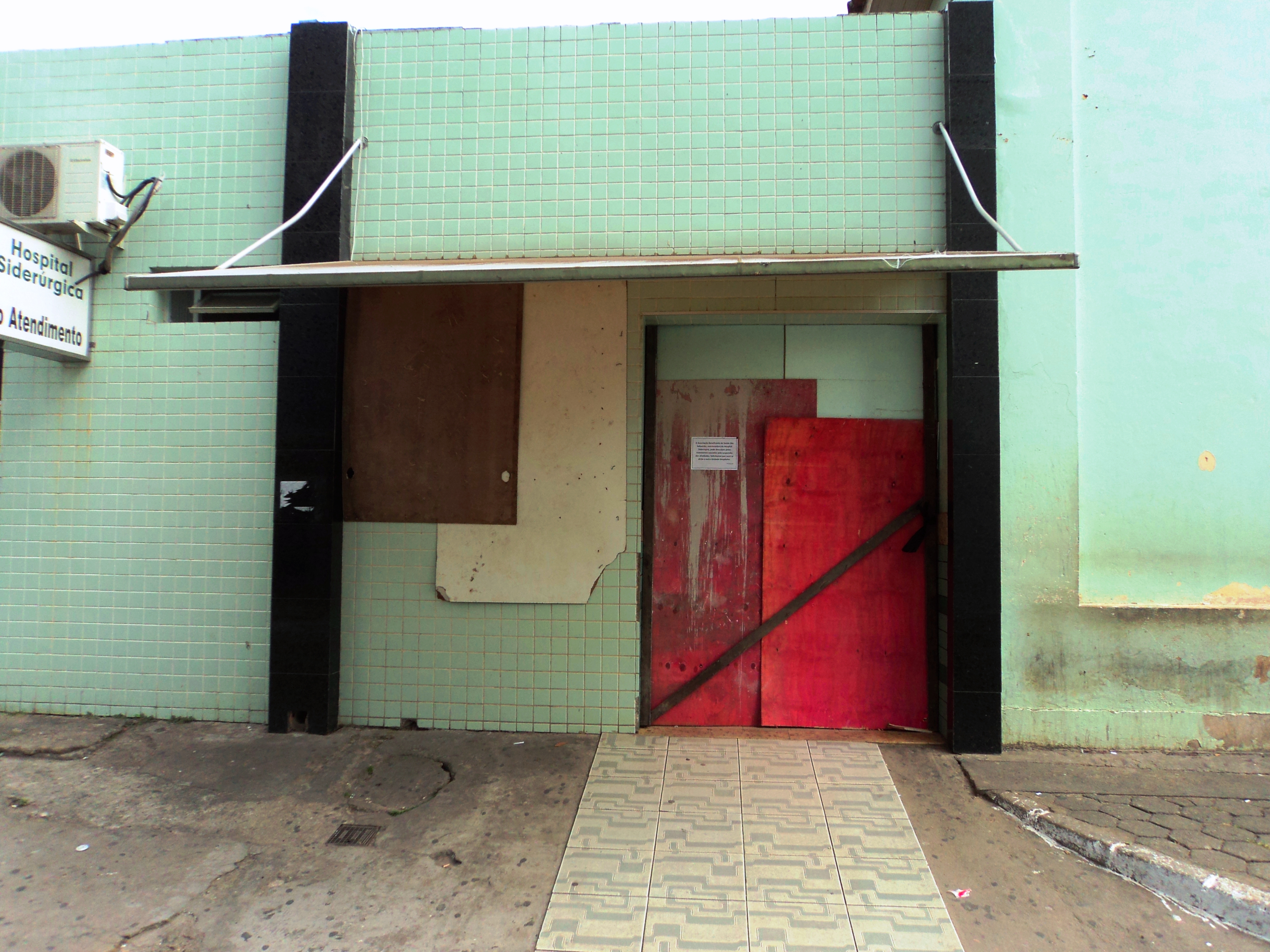
Emergency room entrance of the then Siderúrgica Hospital, closed in 2011

After being managed by the Sisters of Our Lady of Mercy, the Siderúrgica Hospital, in turn, came to be governed by the Associação Beneficente de Saúde São Sebastião. It closed, however, due to financial problems. This mobilized the Union, the state, and the City Hall, and on September 15, it was decided that the Beneficent Society São Camilo would be the new maintainer. In May 2012, the state health secretariat announced that the hospital would be reopened after undergoing renovations, under the name "São Camilo" Hospital. The contract with the São Camilo network came to an end in May 2017, when the municipal administration announced to take over the management of the hospital, which was renamed Doutor José Maria Morais Hospital. The same management also inaugurated the Emergency Care Unit (UPA) Doutor Walter Luiz Winter Maia in the Sílvio Pereira II neighborhood on June 25, 2020.

The city faced, especially between the 1990s and 2000s, a considerable reduction in the rates of malnutrition, infant mortality, and early pregnancy. In 2000, 17.2% of all children who were weighed by the Family Health Program were malnourished, while in 2012 this index was 0.7%. In 1998, the infant mortality rate was 28.5 deaths per thousand live births, while in 2012 the rate was 17.4. The percentage of children born to adolescent mothers fell from 16.5% in 2001 to 13.3% in 2011. On the other hand, following the trend that was once restricted to large centers and has become a reality in much of the interior of Brazil, in 1990, one case of AIDS was identified in the municipality, with 15 records in 1997 and 16 in 2006.

In 2020, Coronel Fabriciano felt the impacts of the COVID-19 pandemic. On March 15, the municipality registered its first case, which was also the fifth in the state. As a preventive and preparatory measure, commerce was paralyzed for five days in March, while classes and events remained suspended for the following months. However, contrary to the guidelines prepared by the municipal government to allow commercial activity to continue and the recommendations for social distancing made by health organizations, crowds and disrespect for the instructions were recorded by part of the population. As a result, by September 15, six months after the first case, 3,137 cases had been confirmed, and 64 deaths had been reported, although more than 2,859 individuals had already recovered. The number of cases was lower than in Ipatinga (8,183) and higher than in Timóteo (1,708).

=== Education ===
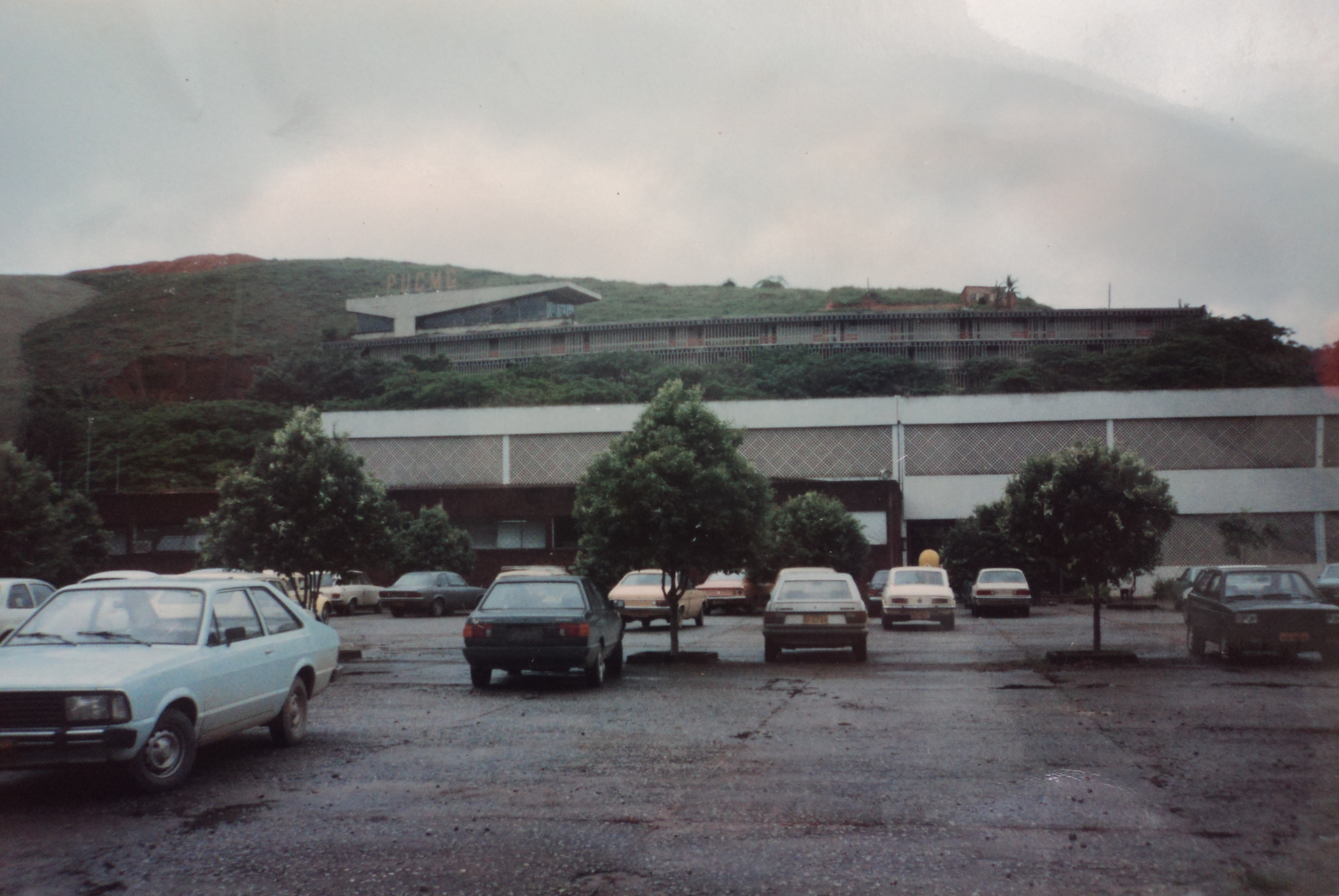
View of Unileste, then a PUC Minas campus, in 1990.

The Professor Pedro Calmon State School, created in 1952, was the first school built in Coronel Fabriciano. Initially, it was attended by the children of the most influential families in the city, many of whom obtained good results in competitive university entrance examinations. On the other hand, by the end of the 1950s, education in Coronel Fabriciano was still precarious, with high dropout and illiteracy rates. Pedro Calmom did not support the demand for enrollments, the same situation faced by the elementary school of the then district of Ipatinga, which operated in the police station headquarters, and by the Padre Deolindo Coelho School Group, in Melo Viana. According to data from Rotary International, present in the city since 1959, at that time about 57% of the population was illiterate and 43% couldn't read and write, a situation that began to be reversed with the building of new schools in partnership with the state, starting in the 1960s.

Colégio Angélica, founded by the Archbishop of the Archdiocese of Mariana, Dom Helvécio Gomes de Oliveira, was the first private educational institution. Its activities extended to other sectors of society, such as teaching catechism to children in support of the Saint Sebastian Parish, and social assistance to the residents of Morro do Carmo, where they developed courses in manual labor, cooking, and sewing. The Alberto Giovannini State School, founded on June 28, 1969, in the presence of the governor of Minas Gerais Israel Pinheiro, was the first state school in the Vale do Aço region. In the same year, the Professora Mariana Roque Pires Pires Public Library was created by mayor Mariano Pires Pontes, whose name reveres the pioneer of public education in the city.

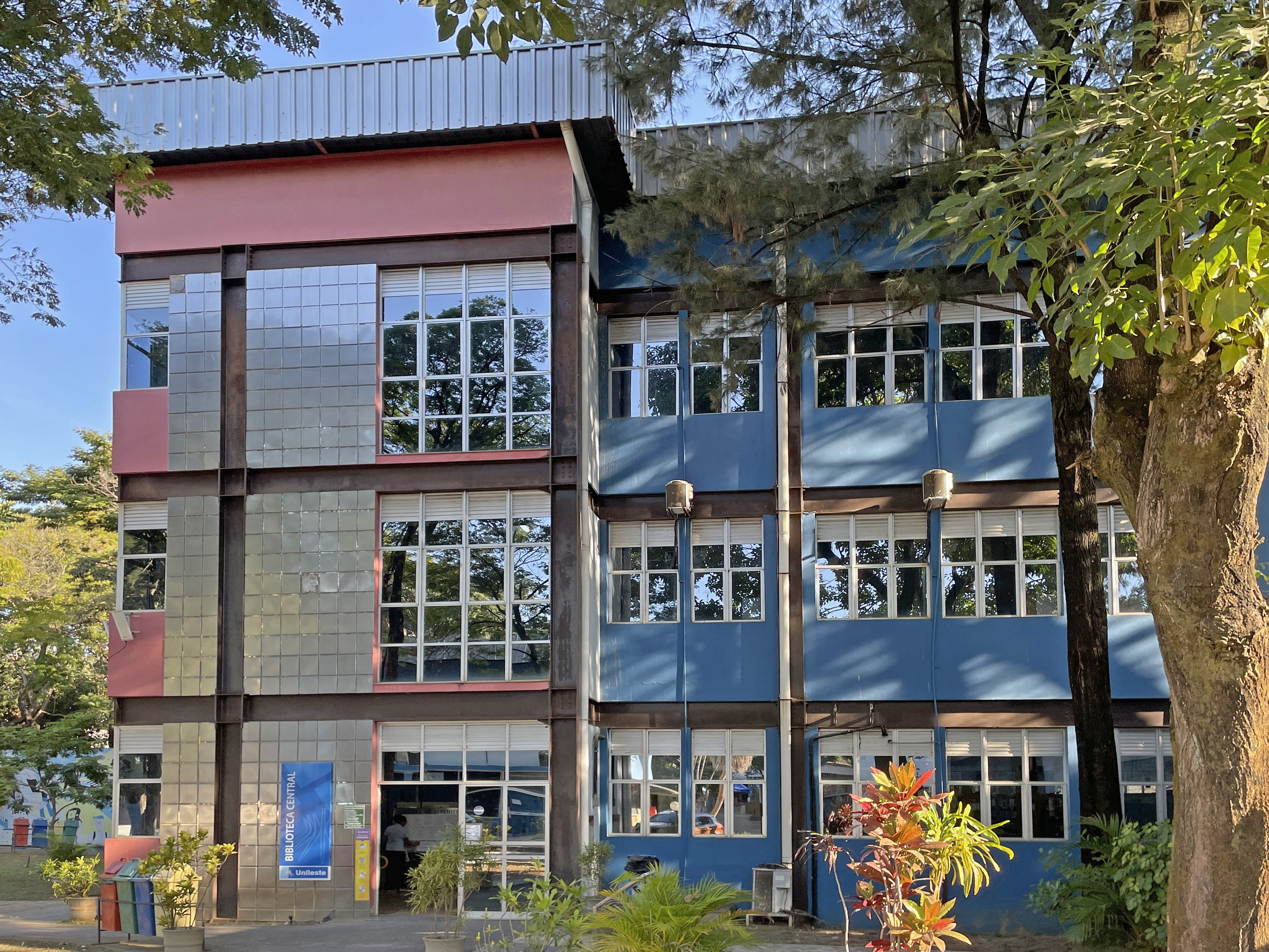
Dom Serafim Cardeal Fernandes Araújo Library (Central Library), at Unileste, founded on February 26, 1999.

Also in the late 1960s, the University of Labor (UT) was established, the current Catholic University Center of Eastern Minas Gerais (Unileste), whose foundation on April 1, 1969 was due to the Congregation Padres do Trabalho. The institution developed into the largest educational complex in the Vale do Aço, part of a network of other higher education institutions and colleges in the Federal District, Tocantins and eastern Minas Gerais. Along with the coming of Unileste, in the early 1970s, the Padres do Trabalho were in charge of building the university neighborhoods, intended to serve as housing for students and professors.

The campus of Unileste in Coronel Fabriciano is also home to landmarks such as the Fazendinha, which initially functioned as a guest house and was planned as a replica of the farm that existed prior to the construction of the university center; the João Paulo II Theater, built in 1978 on the first floor of the Padre de Man College, on the university campus; the Dom Serafim Cardeal Fernandes Araújo Library (Central Library), which has one of the largest bibliographic collections in the region; and the Father Joseph Cornélius Marie de Man Museum, which was established in 1993 and contributes to the preservation of local and institutional history. In October 2014, the José Avelino Barbosa Museum was opened, which was the first public museum in the municipality and whose name reveres the businessman and merchant who was one of the pioneers of the city.

=== Religion ===
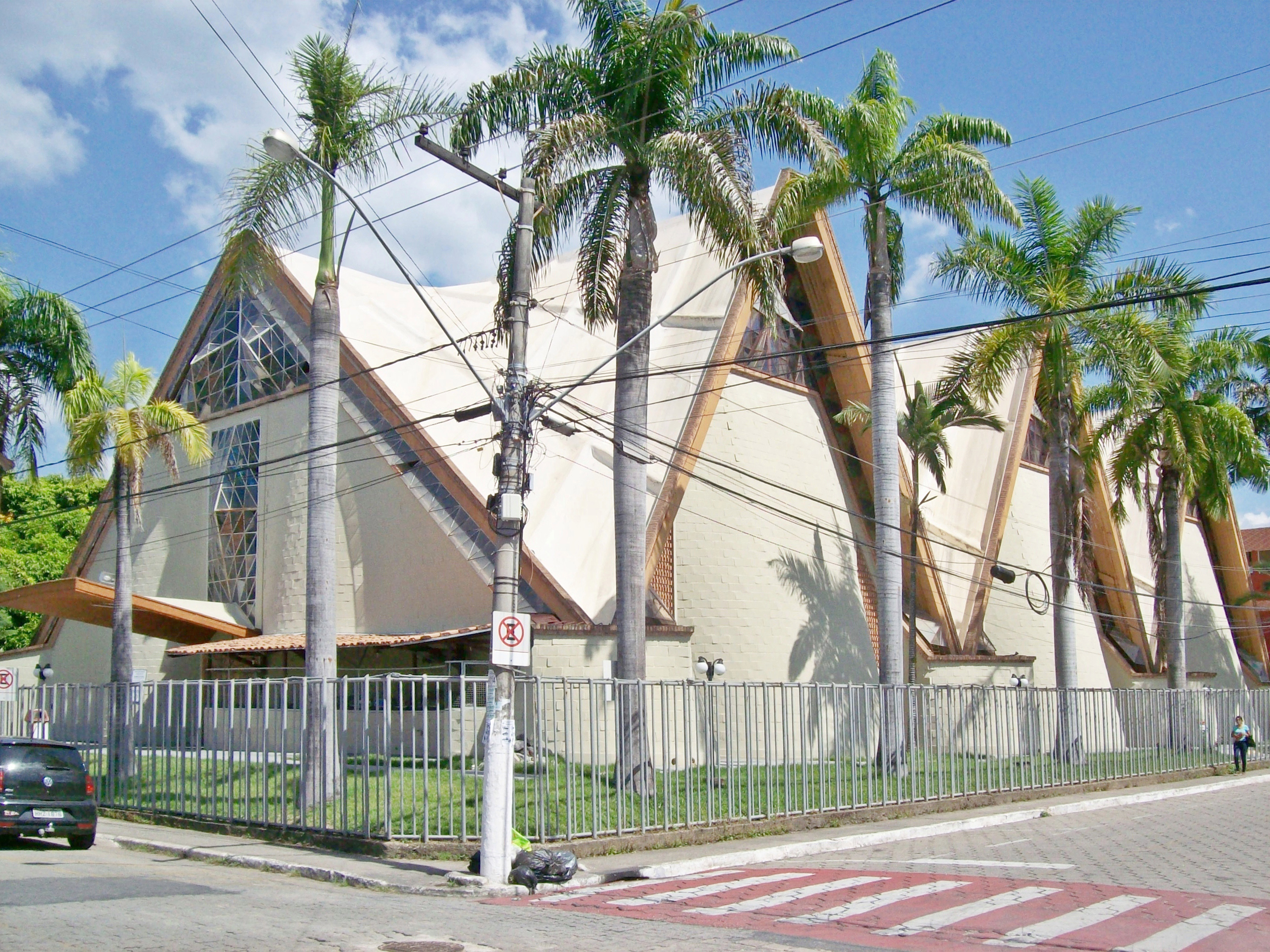
Saint Sebastian Cathedral, inaugurated in 1993 and since then the seat of the Diocese of Itabira-Fabriciano. Photo from 2015.

The accelerated and sometimes uncontrolled demographic growth favored an increase in the housing deficit and violence. Thus, religious institutions began to intervene with religious teachings and social projects. The Catholic Church, through its congregations, mediated directly in the construction of Colégio Angélica and the hospitals Siderúrgica and Nossa Senhora do Carmo. At the end of the 1960s, the Diocese of Itabira, together with the Catholic congregation of the Padres do Trabalho, helped in the creation of the University of Labor (UT), now Unileste, and the Society of Saint Vincent de Paul was responsible for building houses for the victims of the 1979 floods in the current Frederico Ozanan neighborhood. The Nossa Senhora Auxiliadora Musical Corporation, created in 1943, was deactivated in 1960, becoming active again after receiving musical instruments donated by ALMG, and was maintained for some time by the Vincentians.

The Saint Sebastian Parish, which initially comprised the entire municipal territory, was created months before the political emancipation, in 1948. Among other achievements, the ecclesiastical circumscription was in charge of the foundation of the Saint Sebastian Parish Church, in 1949, replacing the old one that had collapsed; for the construction of the São José Parish Hall, in 1959; and for the installation of the Educadora Radio, run since then by the Congregation of the Redemptorist Missionaries. On January 20, 1963, the Santo Antônio Parish was created, corresponding to the Senador Melo Viana district.

On June 1, 1979, Pope John Paul II, through the decree Cum urbs vulgo Coronel Fabriciano, changed the name of the local diocese to Diocese of Itabira-Fabriciano. The function of the co-cathedral was assigned to the Mother Church, but there was a need for a larger temple, due to crowding, and on July 4, 1993, the co-cathedral of Saint Sebastian was inaugurated. On March 27, 2011, the creation of the São Francisco Xavier Parish occurred, dismembered from the Santo Antônio Parish. On May 9, 2021, Nossa Senhora de Fátima Parish was emancipated from the Saint Sebastian Parish.

Since the 1950s and more markedly between the 1980s and 1990s, however, the Catholic Church shares space with other religious faiths, ranging from the most varied Protestant Christian denominations to esoteric and indigenous practices, in addition to the presence of those without religion.

=== Culture and leisure ===
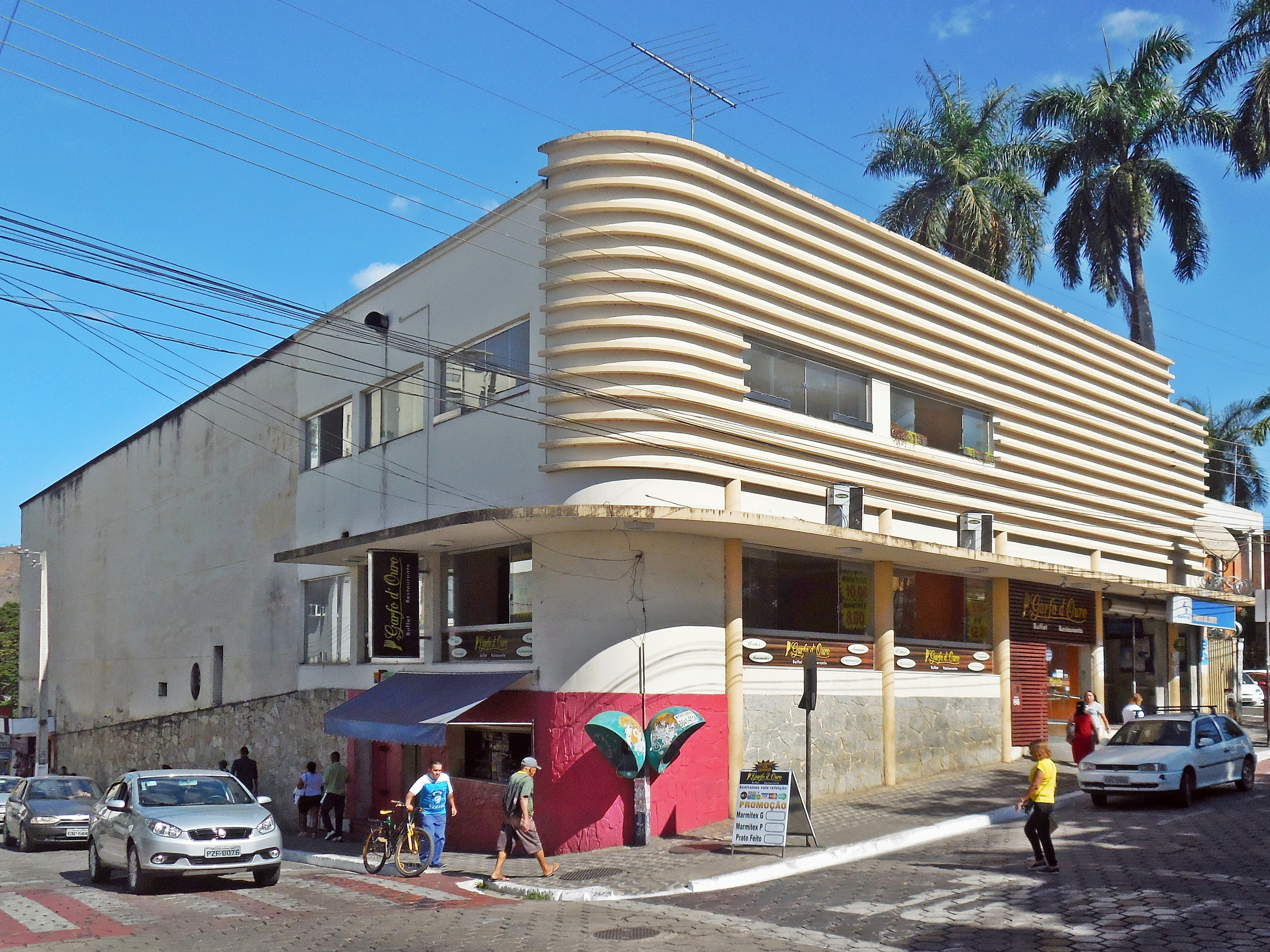
The former Cine Marrocos building

Coronel Fabriciano was an important regional cultural center in terms of nightlife, especially between the 1960s and the 1980s. During this period, the city had almost 40 bars, restaurants, and nightclubs that initially aimed to cater to the workers of the local steel mills, which sometimes attracted people even from the capital of Minas Gerais. After the 1990s, the nightlife flow observed a considerable reduction, migrating from the Center of Fabriciano to Avenida Magalhães Pinto. Carnival dances, held by the city government from 1960 on, ceased to exist around 1990. Junina parties have largely been present since the 1970s, most of them organized by Catholic communities or schools. The Casa de Cultura do Vale do Aço, created in 1978, was one of the main stages for scenic and theatrical performances and workshops in the region, and the space was later occupied by the São Lucas Hospital in the Santa Terezinha II neighborhood.

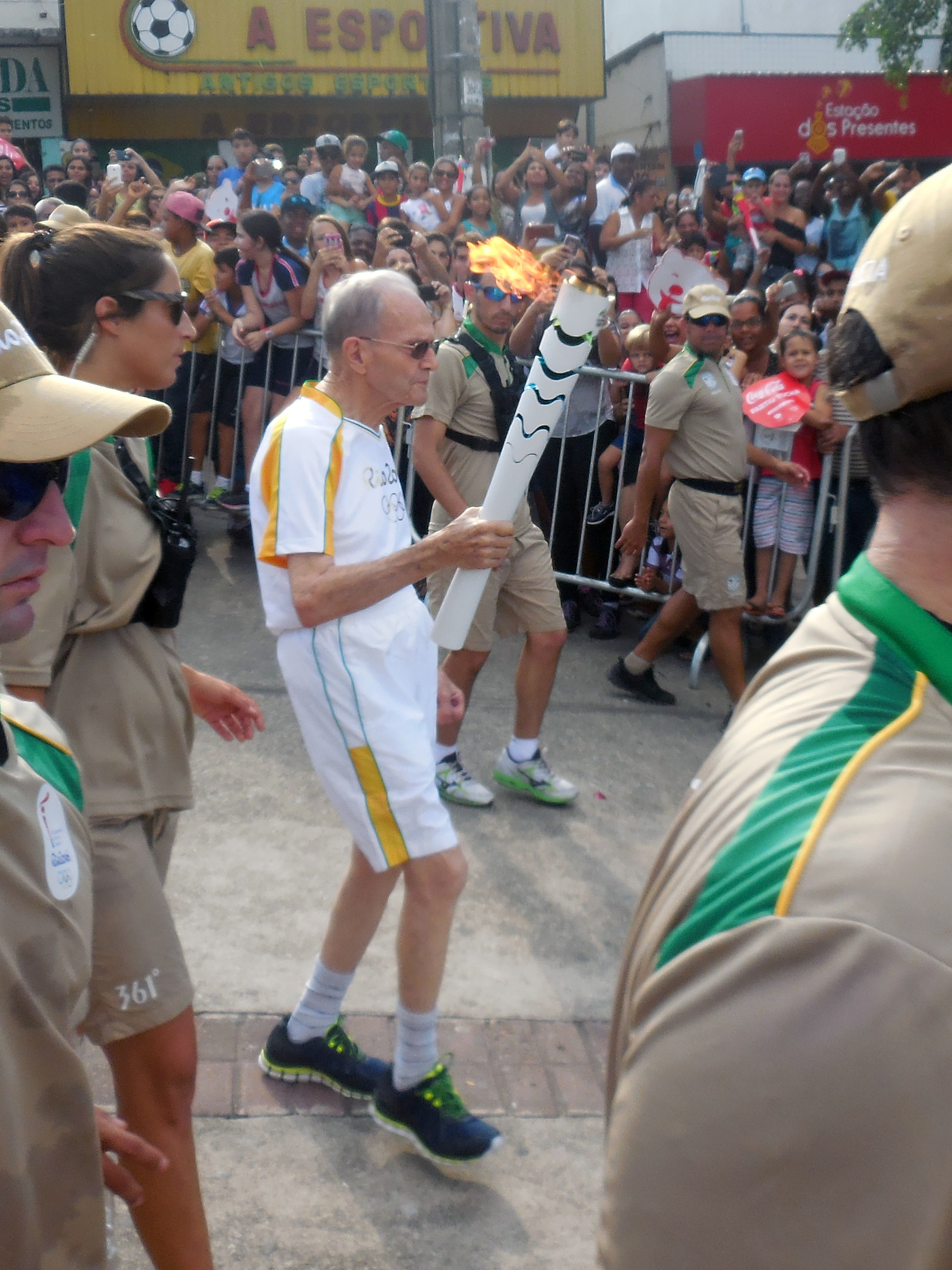
Bishop Lélis Lara during the 2016 Olympic Games torch relay in Coronel Fabriciano

The Tapajós Scout Group was created in 1963, offering the population activities related to Scouting. On the same occasion, the Cine Marrocos was built, housing one of the largest movie theaters in the region, to replace the Cine Glória, located on the current Rua Moacir Birro. The latter, in turn, was inaugurated in the 1950s, and in the first years of its operation was the main form of leisure for families from the city since there was still no television in the houses. At the end of the 1980s, the 1,300 seats of the Cine Marrocos were bought by the São Sebastião Parish for the completion of the cathedral works, after the closing of the theater. In the 1990s, there were rumors that the city would receive a large shopping center, the so-called Shopping Três Cidades Mall, which would be located in front of the Unileste campus. The first columns of the development were placed, however, the land was judicially blocked in 1997 and the area was abandoned.

In Serra dos Cocais, the handicrafts and marujadas of the rural communities and tourism gained prominence and incentives in the course of the second half of the 20th century.

Coronel Fabriciano's football, in turn, obtained regional prominence for its amateurism tradition. The Social Futebol Clube, founded in 1944, was the most successful football team in the city, having participated in the elite division of the Mineiro Championship after the 1990s. Social's biggest rival in Fabriciano was União Esporte Clube, created in 1956, and renamed Avante Esporte Clube in September 1958, when the Josemar Soares Stadium was created as Avante's home. In September 1968, Rosalpes was created from the merger of two teams that used the same field for training: Alpes and Santa Rosa. Initially, the club trained on land that was occupied by residences where the Giovannini neighborhood is located.

On October 10, 2012, the Trio Futebol Clube was founded by Marcelo Vieira, one of the founders of Fabriciano Futebol Clube. The latter had been created in Coronel Fabriciano in 2008 but had its headquarters transferred to the municipality of Nova Serrana, becoming the Nacional Esporte Clube Ltda.

Another important occurrence in sports was the passing of the torch relay of the Summer Olympic Games on May 12, 2016, traveling through streets in the central region between the Terra Mãe Monument and the Estação Square.

== General references ==
- Neto, Mário de Carvalho (2018). Almanaque A História de Coronel Fabriciano (in Brazilian Portuguese). Coronel Fabriciano-MG: MCN Comunicação e Editora – via Revista Caminhos Gerais.

== Bibliography ==
- Cartilha do Cidadão (1998). Vale do Aço - Perfil histórico, cultural e informativo - Coronel Fabriciano, Ipatinga e Timóteo (in Brazilian Portuguese). João Monlevade-MG: Click Ideias Assessoria Ltda.
- Diário do Aço (1999). Vale do Aço 2000: Um século de história (in Brazilian Portuguese). Ipatinga-MG: Empresa Jornalística Revisão Ltda.
- Diocese de Itabira-Fabriciano (2011). "Livro da Caminhada" (PDF) (in Brazilian Portuguese). Archived from the original (PDF) on 20 October 2014.
- Genovez, Patrícia Falco; Valadares, Vagner Bravos (2013). "A formação territorial de Coronel Fabriciano (sede) e de Ipatinga (distrito) entre as décadas de 1920 e 1960: afinal, quem são os Estabelecidos e os Outsiders?". Revista de História Regional Universidade Estadual de Ponta Grossa (in Brazilian Portuguese). 18 (2): 363–388. doi:10.5212/Rev.Hist.Reg.v.18i2.0005. Archived from the original on 14 July 2014.
- Gomes, Leonardo (2012). "Grande Guia dos Bairros de Coronel Fabriciano". Revista Nosso Vale (in Brazilian Portuguese) (15). Archived from the original on 6 October 2014.
- Lacerda, Ricardo Santos (2007). "Rotary Club - poder invisível na terra prometida (1959-1967)" (PDF) (in Brazilian Portuguese). Programa de Pós-graduação em História da Universidade Federal do Espírito Santo (UFES). Archived from the original (PDF) on 8 August 2019.
- Secretaria Municipal de Educação e Cultura (2011). Atlas Escolar Histórico, Geográfico e Cultural de Coronel Fabriciano (in Brazilian Portuguese). Belo Horizonte-MG: Editora Cultural Brasileira Ltda.
- Secretaria Municipal de Educação e Cultura (2013). Bens inventariados no município de Coronel Fabriciano (PDF) (in Brazilian Portuguese). 1. Archived from the original (PDF) on 24 September 2014.
