= Calado station =

Former railway station in Minas Gerais, Brazil

Calado Station Estação do Calado

General information
- Other names: Coronel Fabriciano Station
- Location: Current Pedro Nolasco Street; Brazil
- Coordinates: 19°31′48″S 42°37′26″W
- Owner: Vitória-Minas Railway
- Manager: Vale S.A. (until its deactivation)
- Line: Vitória-Minas Railway
- Platforms: 1

Other information
- Status: Demolished. In its place the Coronel Fabriciano Bus Terminal was built

History
- Opened: 9 June 1924
- Closed: 29 January 1979
- Former names: Raul Soares
Location
- Location within Minas Gerais

The Calado Station ("Estação Calado"), also known as Coronel Fabriciano Station, was a railway station that operated as a passenger and loading and unloading terminal in the Brazilian municipality of Coronel Fabriciano, in the countryside of the state of Minas Gerais. It was inaugurated on June 9, 1924, being at the time one of the three largest stations of the Vitória-Minas Railway (EFVM). Around it was established the urban core that gave rise to the headquarters of the then-subordinated district to Antônio Dias, emancipated in 1948.

The population growth in the central region of the city led to the displacement of the railroad outside the urban perimeter, culminating in the closure of the station in 1979 and later its demolition. The Coronel Fabriciano Bus Terminal was built on the site. The destruction of the old railway terminal without any hindrance from the authorities represented the loss of historic and cultural municipal heritage since it had an influence on the development of the city and was part of the local daily life, besides being part of the history of the EFVM.

== History ==
The construction of the terminal occurred due to the advancement of the EFVM lease through the Rio Doce Valley. The implementation of the railroad had been paralyzed near Belo Oriente, being resumed in the early 1920s. On this occasion, the first workers responsible for the railroad and station were established in the place known as Barra do Calado since it was located near the mouth of the Caladão stream. In Santo Antônio de Piracicaba, in the current Melo Viana neighborhood, the development of the settlement led to the creation of the Melo Viana district in 1923, subordinated to Antônio Dias. Before that, Barra do Calado and Santo Antônio de Piracicaba were on the route of troopers who traveled the region transporting cargo and goods, and the population was of no more than a few hundred residents.

Dozens of tents were improvised in Calado to shelter workers, many of whom were northeasterners from Bahia and Sergipe. The station was built near the bank of the Piracicaba River in 1922, before the EFVM, and so the terminal remained unused for about two years. It was inaugurated on June 9, 1924, receiving the provisional name of Raul Soares Station in honor of the governor Raul Soares de Moura, later changed to Calado after the town. At the time, its platform was 30 meters long, one of the three largest on the railroad. The beginning of operations was much celebrated by the district, as it favored the entry and exit of cargo and goods, previously transported by animals or canoes via the Piracicaba River. It was also the first masonry work in the municipality and remained the most imposing until the construction of the Sobrado dos Pereira in 1928.

Around the terminal, the first houses were raised in the region where the central neighborhood was built, which became the headquarters of the Melo Viana district in 1933, due to the long distance that the clerk José Zacarias da Silva Roque had to travel on foot between the notary's office and the station. At that time, the flow of cargo was restricted to the arrival of small packages and food, but with the establishment of the Companhia Siderúrgica Belgo-Mineira in the locality, the terminal became a hub of machinery unloading and wood loading as well as coal destined for the plants in João Monlevade. The company sought to centralize logging and coal production in the Doce River region to feed the furnaces of the industrial complex. To this end, trucks transported the wood to the station to then be loaded onto trains. Thus, the timber sector came to represent the main economic source in the district throughout the 1930s, but domestic commercial activity also benefited, attracting consumers from neighboring towns through the four daily train stops.

=== Heyday ===
The former district of Melo Viana gave rise to the city of Coronel Fabriciano, emancipated on December 27, 1948. The development of the central region of the city was driven by the installation of the industrial complexes of Acesita (now Aperam South America), in the neighboring municipality Timóteo; and Usiminas, in Ipatinga. The first machinery and workers in the construction of Acesita, located on the other bank of the Piracicaba River, disembarked at Calado Station in the 1940s. The presence of the EFVM was one of the decisive factors for the establishment of companies in the Steel Valley, providing a way for production to flow, and the Belgo-Mineira company was already proceeding with local wood extraction in the former railway terminal.

In addition to the lumber yards, the station yard hosted a variety of events and parties. During the time that the railroad served the city, the Companhia Vale do Rio Doce, which managed the railroad and the terminal from 1942 on, also built a total of 102 houses for its employees. The models of the houses, which were built close to the tracks, varied according to the hierarchy of the worker in the company, from the simplest to the highest standard. Most of the houses in Coronel Fabriciano were sold over time and then completely renovated or even demolished. With the creation of the first urban bus lines, the presence of the station and the surrounding businesses turned Pedro Nolasco Street into the main stop in the Center of Fabriciano.

The peak of its operation occurred in the 1960s, as it was located in the middle of one of the busiest commercial centers in the region and served to support the flow of timber production, in addition to passenger transportation. On this occasion, the station became home to the First Residence of the Permanent Way ("rimeira Residência da Via Permanentt,") the unit responsible for managing the stretch of railroad between Naque and Itabira. Due to the growth in demand, the building was expanded in the late 1960s, while maintaining its original architecture. It is noteworthy that still in the 1960s the extraction of wood went into decline in the region of Coronel Fabriciano, due to the scarcity of the material, which also supplied the demand of the local steel complexes. With this, Belgo-Mineira withdrew from the city.

=== Deactivation and demolition ===
In the early 1970s, the then Companhia Vale do Rio Doce announced changes in the railroad's route, diverting it from highly populated areas, such as the Center of Fabriciano. With this, the old Calado Station would be closed and the building handed over to the city government. With the deactivation of the railway terminal, the municipal government began the project of building a square in the area, named Praça Mário Carvalho after a Vale worker.

At first, the demolition of the station was not intended and there was no reluctance from the merchants with the transfer of the EFVM from the site and the creation of the square. During an analysis of the execution of the project, however, an engineer pointed out that it would not be possible to build the square without demolishing the building. The city hall's advisors then proposed to the administration that the building be declared a monument because of its historical importance, but the city hall itself authorized the demolition. Thus, the terminal was deactivated on January 29, 1979, and was demolished on March 15, 1982. The destruction work lasted two days; The walls were brought down with tractors, but the platform needed to be dynamited and this took longer.

In the station's place, in the 1980s, the current bus terminal of Coronel Fabriciano and the urban terminal of the municipal public transport were built. However, they were transferred to another location in downtown Fabriciano in 2008, to give way to the Station Square, its name being a reference to the demolished station. In the 1990s, there was the intention to build a replica of the old railway terminal, but the project did not proceed. In the same decade, the construction of a surface subway to Cenibra, in Belo Oriente, was proposed, taking advantage of the EFVM tracks, but the proposal was also unsuccessful. In the path of the railroad, the Rubem Siqueira Maia Avenue was created, connecting the center to the Mangueiras neighborhood.

== Legacy ==
The EFVM still crosses Coronel Fabriciano (outside the center), but the railway station that serves the city is located inside Timóteo and is called Mário Carvalho Station. Despite the displacement of the railway, the terminal is still closer to Central Fabriciano than to any Timóteo residential neighborhood, as it is located on the bank of the Piracicaba River, which divides Central Fabriciano from the neighboring town.

The demolition of the station represented the destruction of the historical and cultural heritage of Coronel Fabriciano, considering that it had strong importance for the development of the municipality. In addition, many residents had memories that referred to the terminal, which was located in one of the busiest areas of central Fabriciano. However, its historical relevance goes beyond the municipal territory, since its origins date back to the construction of the Vitória a Minas Railroad by Vale. Several other Brazilian railway stations with significant historical magnitude for their municipalities had the same fate.

The demolished station is still remembered in the city through manifestations, such as its portrait in the painting "The last train" ("O último trem"), by the artist Mirian Franco. The work was commissioned by José Anastácio Franco, based on an image by the photographer Argemiro Ribeiro, and later donated to the city and declared a municipal cultural heritage on April 28, 1999. Outside the São Sebastião Cathedral, there is a miniature of the Calado Station. Some objects from the station are housed in the José Avelino Barbosa Museum, which was inaugurated in October 2014. Photos and records, sometimes displayed in public offices, contribute to the documentation of the history of the old terminal. The collection of the Vale Museum in Vila Velha, Espírito Santo, also includes photographs and information about this and other stations of the EFVM.

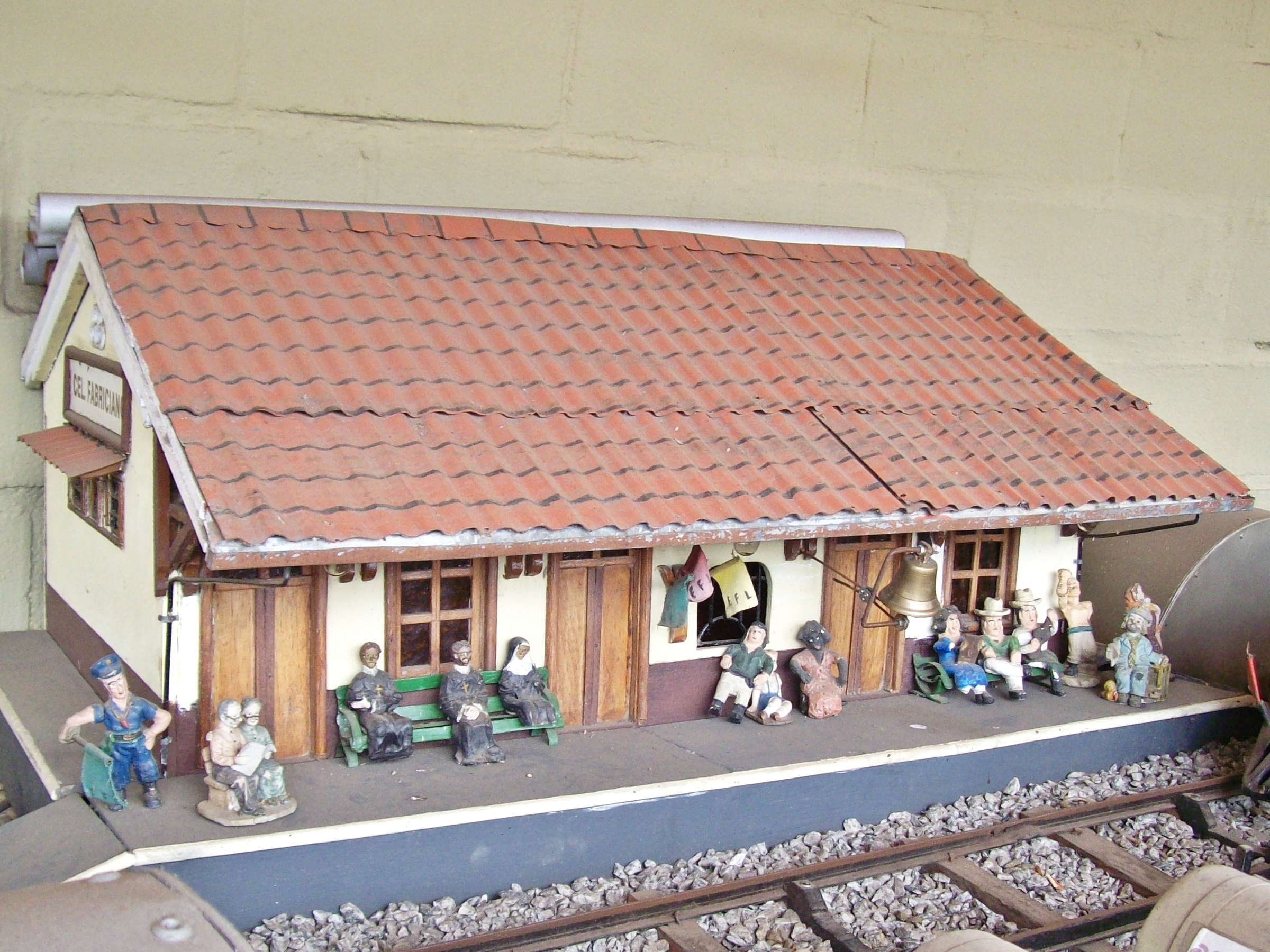
Miniature Calado Station at São Sebastião Cathedral

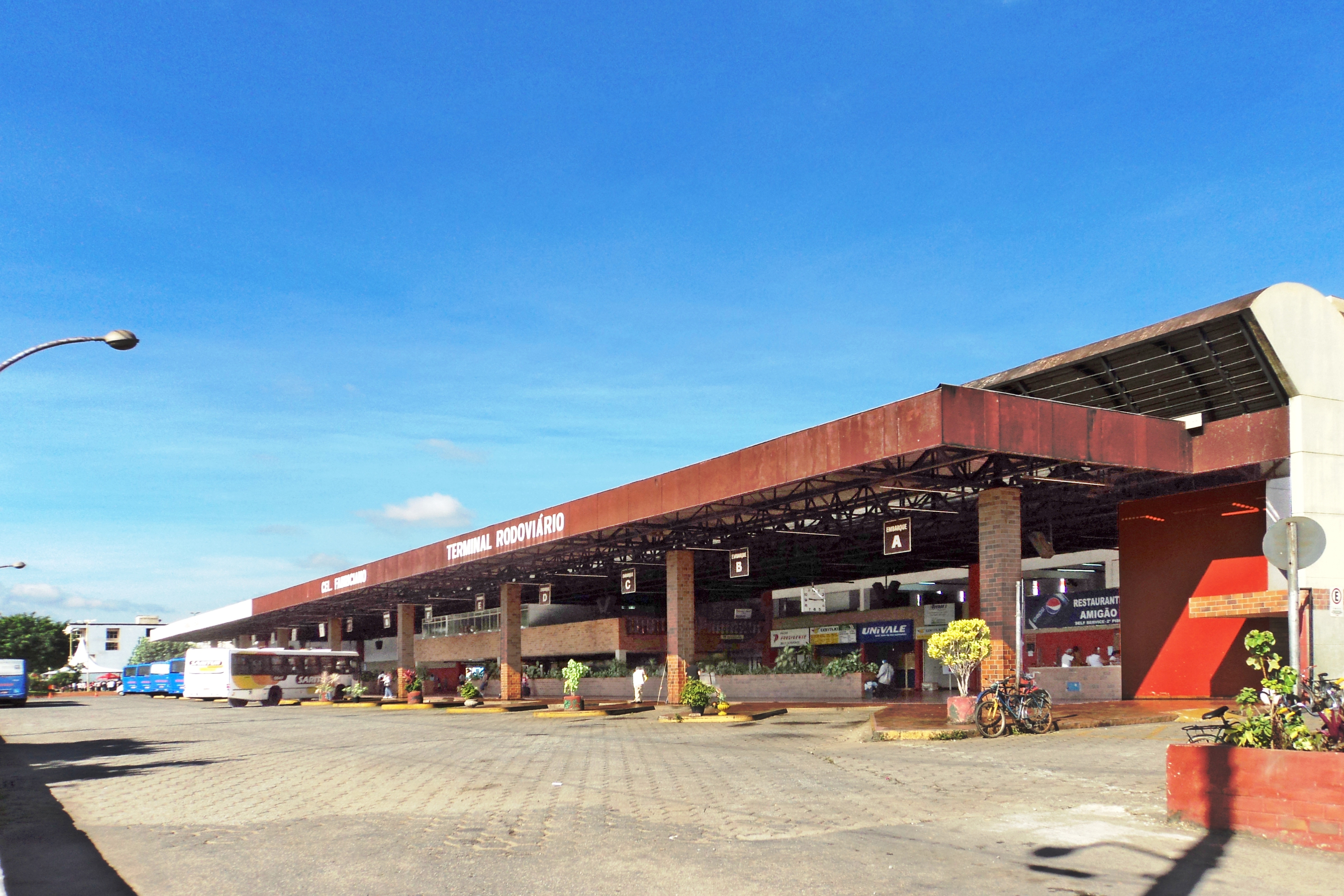
View of the Bus Terminal built in the 1980s on the place where the railway station used to be

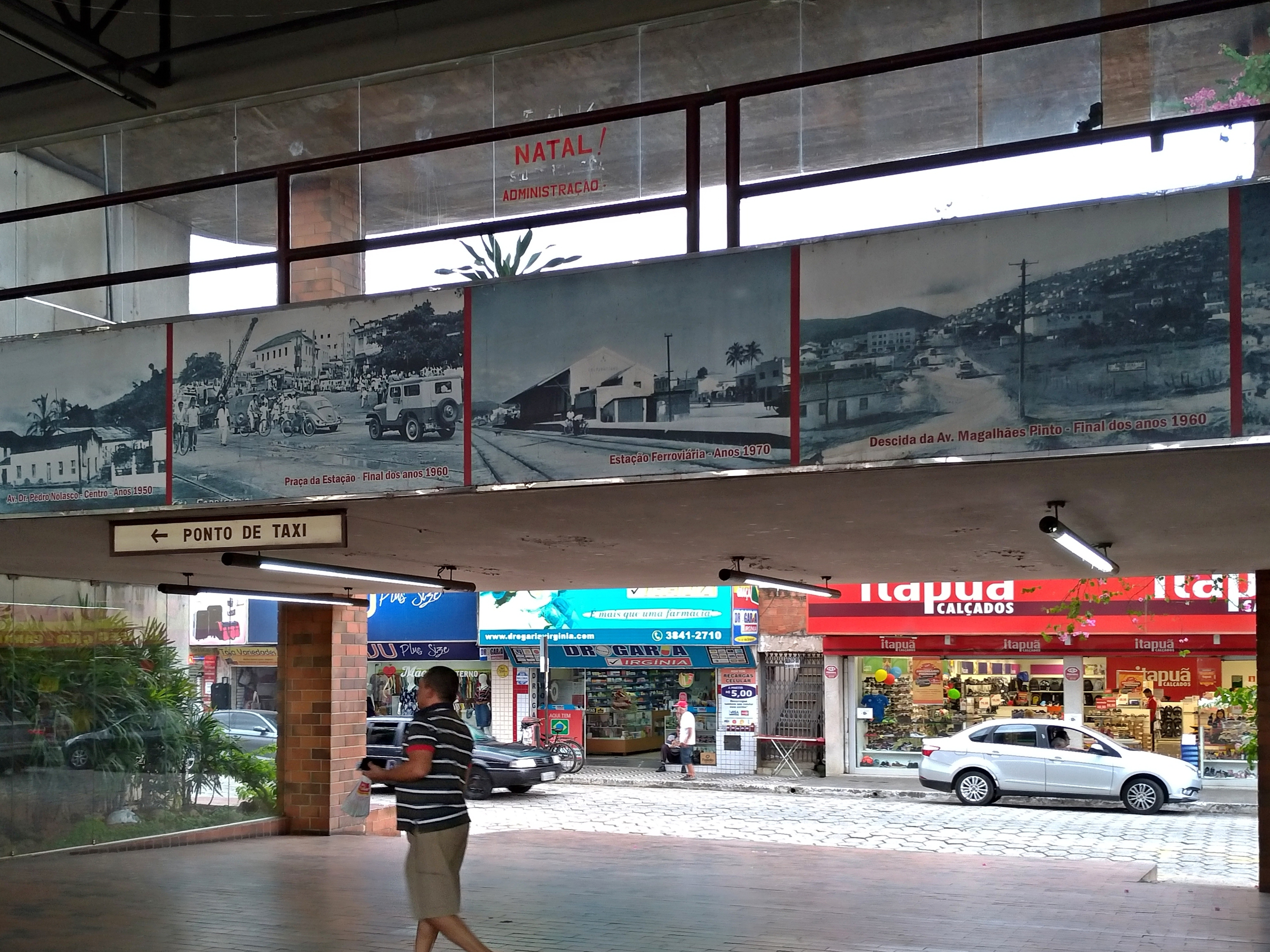
Historic photos at the Bus Terminal, including the Calado Station (third image from left to right).

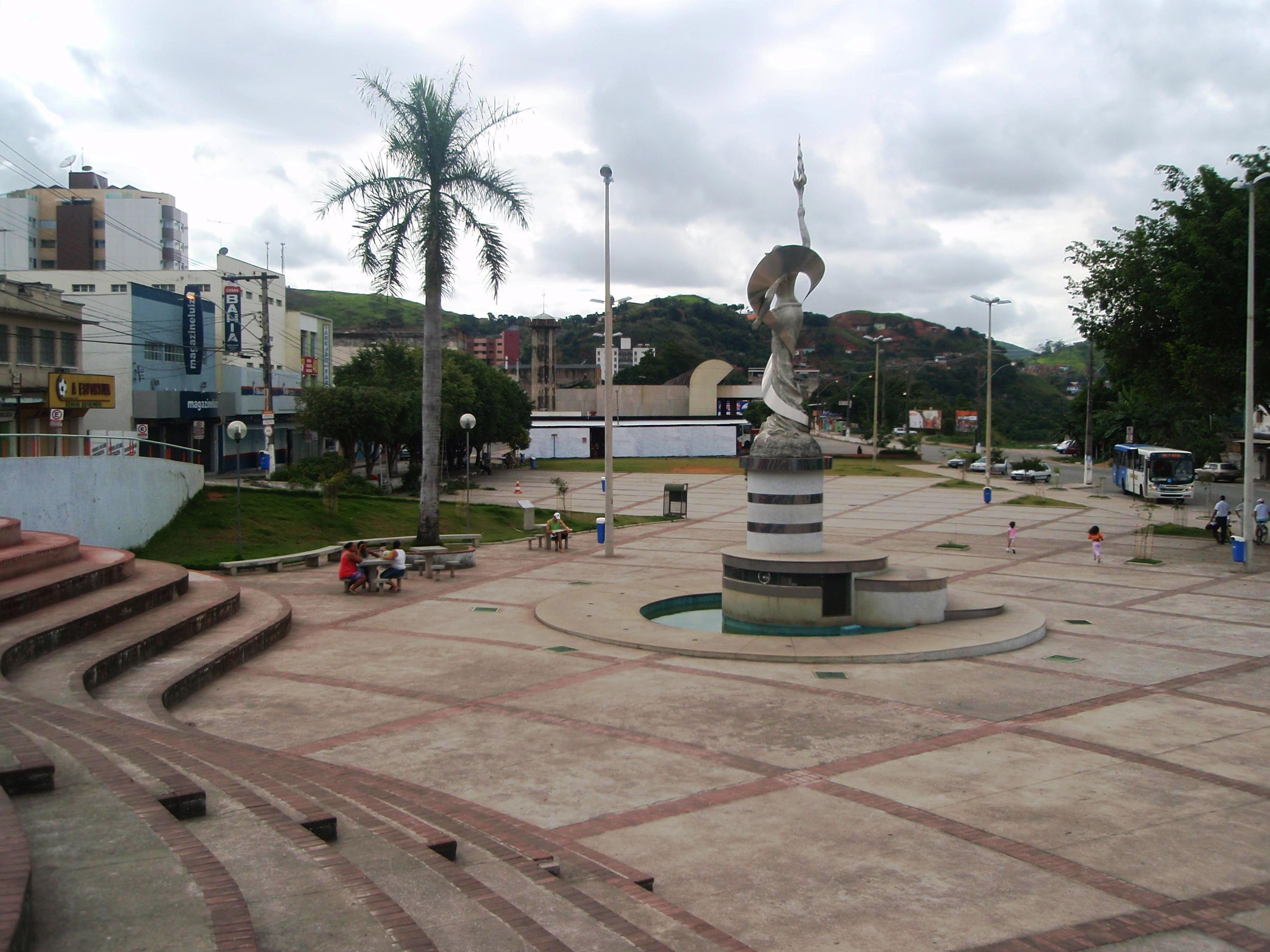
View of the Estação Square, next to the Bus Terminal.

== See also ==
- History of Coronel Fabriciano
