= Vitória-Minas Railway =

Brazilian railway

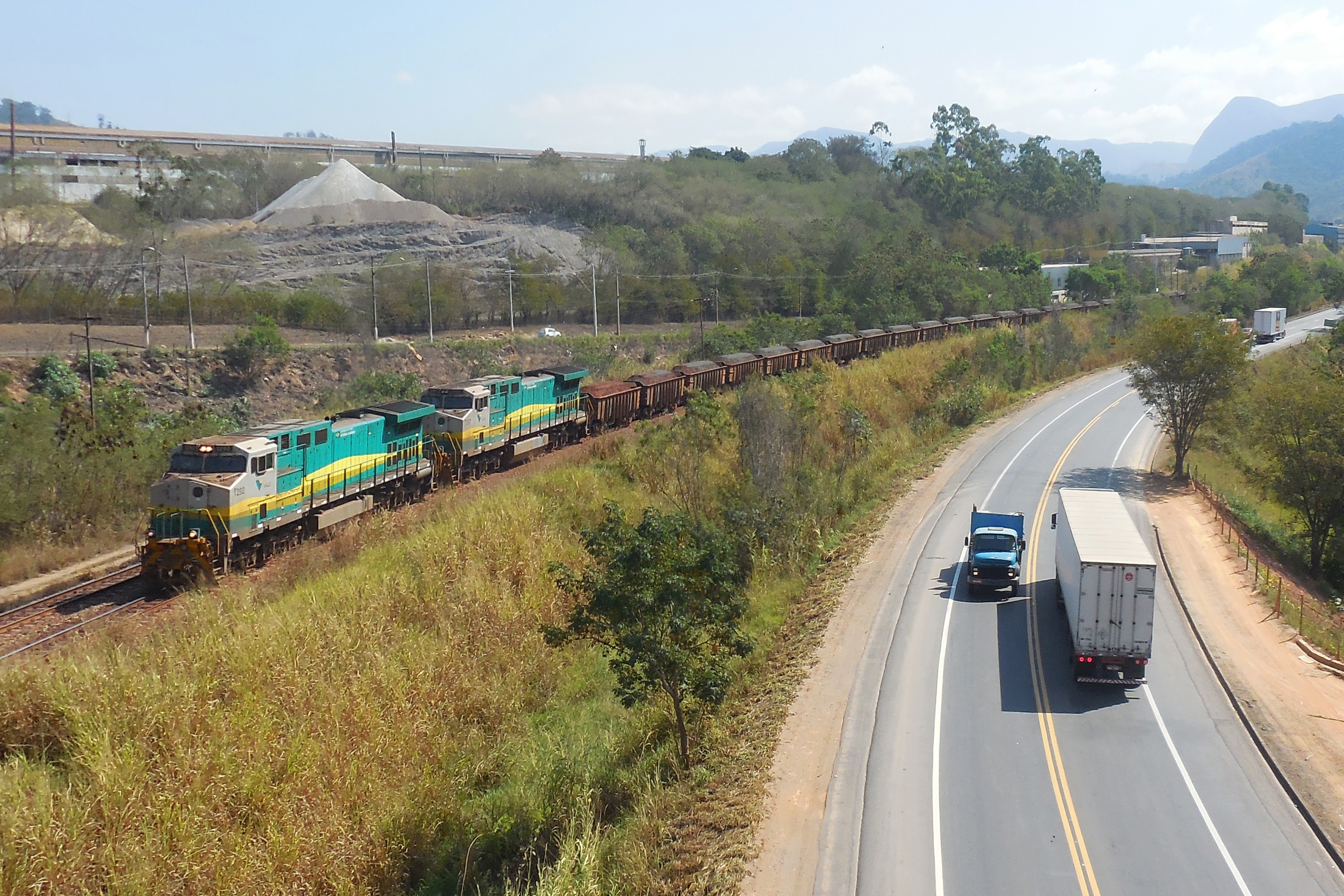

Overview
- Service type: Inter-city
- Status: Operational
- Locale: Minas Gerais and Espírito Santo, Brazil
- First service: 13 May 1904
- Current operator: Vale S.A.
- Website: vale.com/passenger-train

Route
- Termini: Belo Horizonte; Vitória
- Stops: 28
- Distance travelled: 905 km (562 mi)
- Average journey time: 13 hours–13 hours, 10 minutes
- Service frequency: 2 per day

On-board services
- Classes: Economic, executive and accessible
- Disabled access: Fully accessible
- Seating arrangements: 4 across in Economic Class, 3 across in Executive Class
- Catering facilities: On-board café, at-seat meals
- Entertainment facilities: Video monitors in Economic Class, personal sound system in Executive Class
- Baggage facilities: Overhead bins and racks; no checked luggage

Technical
- Track gauge: 1,000 mm (3 ft 3 3/8 in) metre gauge
- Operating speed: 70 km/h (43 mph)

The Vitória-Minas Railway (Portuguese: Estrada de Ferro Vitória a Minas — EFVM) is a Brazilian railway that connects the Metropolitan Region of Vitória, in Espírito Santo, to Belo Horizonte, capital of the state of Minas Gerais – a stretch of the EF-262. It began to be leased at the end of the 19th century and its initial purpose was to transport passengers by rail and to transport coffee from the Vale do Rio Doce and Espírito Santo. Its focus changed in 1908 when it began to transport the iron ore extracted in the municipality of Itabira to the port complexes in Espírito Santo.

The construction of the railroad facilitated the development of new settlements, including Coronel Fabriciano and the Vale do Aço. These areas experienced industrial growth, which was supported by the railway's presence and transportation capabilities. In 1991, the railroad reached the capital of Minas Gerais, following the construction of a new branch line. Over the years, it has become the only railroad in Brazil to provide passenger trains with daily long-distance departures.

== History ==
The building of the Vitória-Minas Railroad began at the end of the 19th century and had a profound impact on the indigenous populations of the region, particularly the Crenaque people, affecting their cultural and social dynamics. It was created by a decree-law approved in February 1902 and the first stretch of railroad, linking the cities of Vitória and Natividade, was inaugurated on May 13, 1904, covering a total of 30 kilometers and with three stops.

The initial project, led by Pedro Augusto Nolasco Pereira da Cunha and João Teixeira Soares, proposed transporting coffee production from Espírito Santo and the Vale do Rio Doce. It envisioned reaching Peçanha, with plans for the railroad to extend to Diamantina and then Araxá, connecting to the Central Railway of Brazil (EFCB). In 1911, after the railroad reached the current region of Naque, from where it would follow the course of the Santo Antônio River towards the center-north of Minas Gerais, the focus shifted to Itabira influenced by the growing mining activities related to iron ore extraction in the municipality. This transition followed the acquisition of the project by English businessmen, who were also involved in mining operations in Itabira. Factors such as the First World War and the Spanish flu pandemic of 1918 impacted the timeline, halting work in Belo Oriente in 1914. In 1919, the project was acquired by American businessman Percival Farquhar.

In the early 1920s, construction resumed and contributed to the development of the embryonic city of Coronel Fabriciano (initially a district of Melo Viana, belonging to Antônio Dias) and later to the Vale do Aço. The region's industrial growth was significantly facilitated by the railroad, which served as a means of transporting the production of local industries, such as Aperam South America (Timóteo) and Usiminas (Ipatinga). The railroad route was extended to Nova Era and Itabira between the 1930s and 1940s.

The Second World War contributed to delays in construction, and in 1942, Companhia Vale do Rio Doce (now Vale S.A.) was established under the guidelines of the Washington Accords. Under the decree, England agreed to cede control of the iron mines to Brazil, the United States committed to purchasing the ore and supporting the steel industry, and Brazil took on responsibility for maintaining the EFVM, tasked with transporting the ore for export. In the following years, several changes were made to the route, including remodeling of the stretch between Vitória and Colatina, in Espírito Santo, and the introduction of the first diesel locomotives in the 1950s. The new machines replaced the entire fleet of steam locomotives until the 60s. Between 1971 and 1977 the line was doubled in length and the railroad, which ended at the Nova Era branch line belonging to the EFCB, reached the capital of Minas Gerais in 1991, after the construction of a bypass.

== Operating data and economic and social position ==
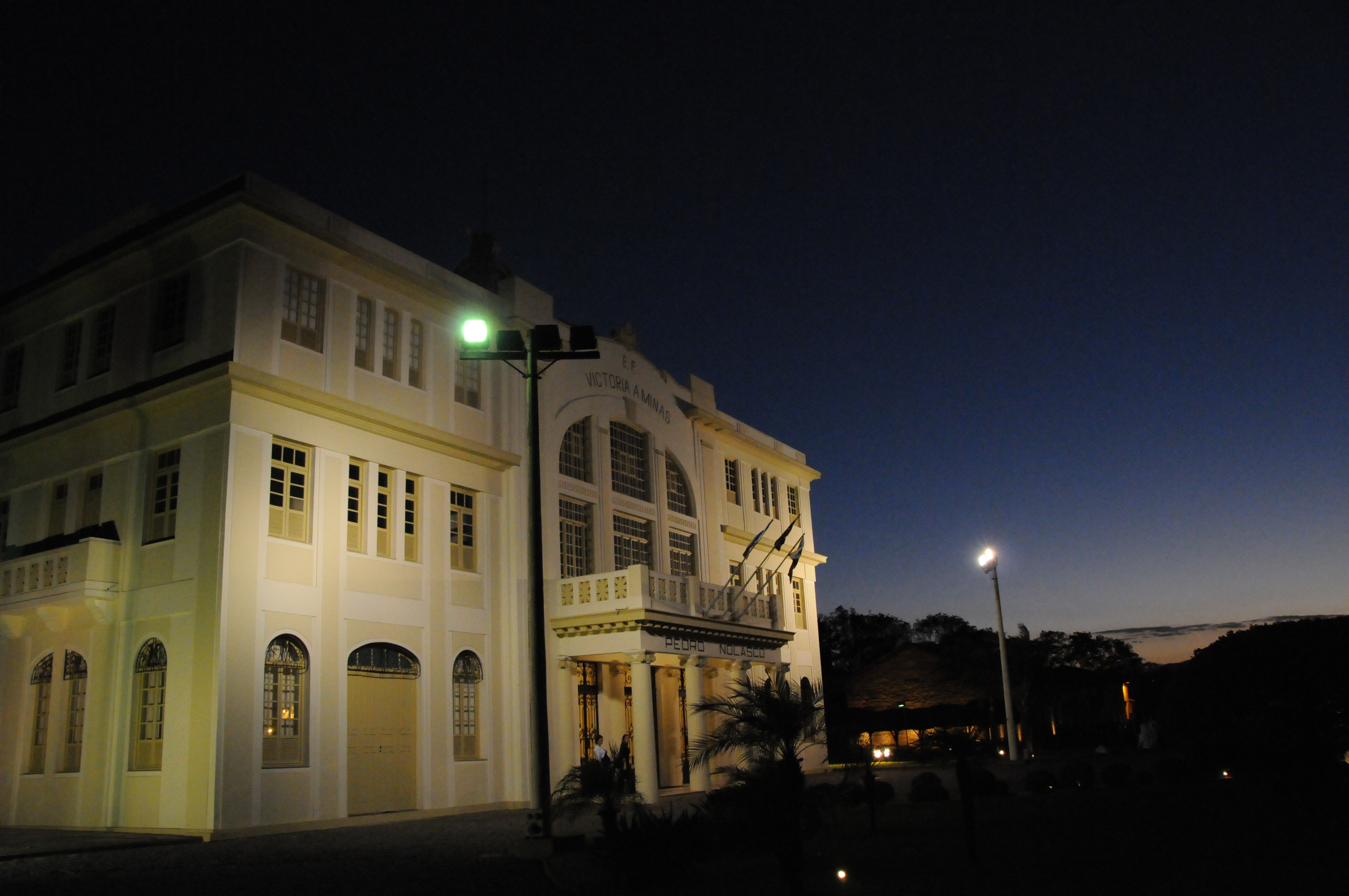
The Vale Museum in Vila Velha is located where the São Carlos Station used to operate, the first station on the EFVM. The building was built in 1927, but the station was relocated to the current Pedro Nolasco Station.

The EFVM is a metric gauge railroad (1,000 millimeters) and has a minimum curve radius of 195 meters and a maximum grade of 1.5%, which allows for a maximum speed of 67 kilometers per hour. It has the highest average accident rate compared to other Brazilian railways, followed by Ferroeste and Carajás Railway, although the rates are still relatively low compared to countries like the United States. With a length of 905 kilometers is managed by Vale S.A., formerly CVRD (Companhia Vale Rio Doce). Operations can be disrupted by flooding of the Doce River and its tributaries, which can cause overflows on sections of the railway. During the floods of 1979, the biggest in the region's history, there was a 35-day stoppage, blocking passenger transport and the flow of iron ore production from Itabira.

As well as being used to transport ore, the railroad is also used to transport steel, coal, limestone, granite, containers, pig iron, agricultural products, wood, cellulose, fuels, and various cargoes, from Minas Gerais to the Tubarão Port Complex, the Vila Velha Terminal, Paul's Quay, Codesa and the Port of Barra do Riacho, in Aracruz, Espírito Santo. In 2014, an annual average of more than 110 million tons of products were transported, which represented 40% of Brazil's rail cargo. The locomotives used, including the models used after the 1990s, are EMD BB40-2, EMD DDM45, EMD GT26CUM, EMD G16, GE BB40-9WM and G-12 numbers 535, 551, 540 and 556.

Most of the products transported by the EFVM are destined for the Port of Tubarão, which features a fully signposted rail yard, one of the largest in Latin America, where wagons are sorted by gravity. The Operational Control Center (CCO) supervises all the railroad's operations, which in 2008 had around 300 customers.

At the beginning of the 2000s, CVRD initiated several community development projects aimed at the communities surrounding the railways, including Educação nos Trilhos (Education on the Rails), first implemented on the Carajás Railway and in December 2003 on the EFVM, in partnership with Canal Futura, giving lectures on health, education and the environment at the railroad stations or in the wagons during journeys; the Olha o Trem (Look at the Train) Project, aimed at safety around the railroad; and the Trem da Cidadania (Citizenship Train).

== Passenger transport ==
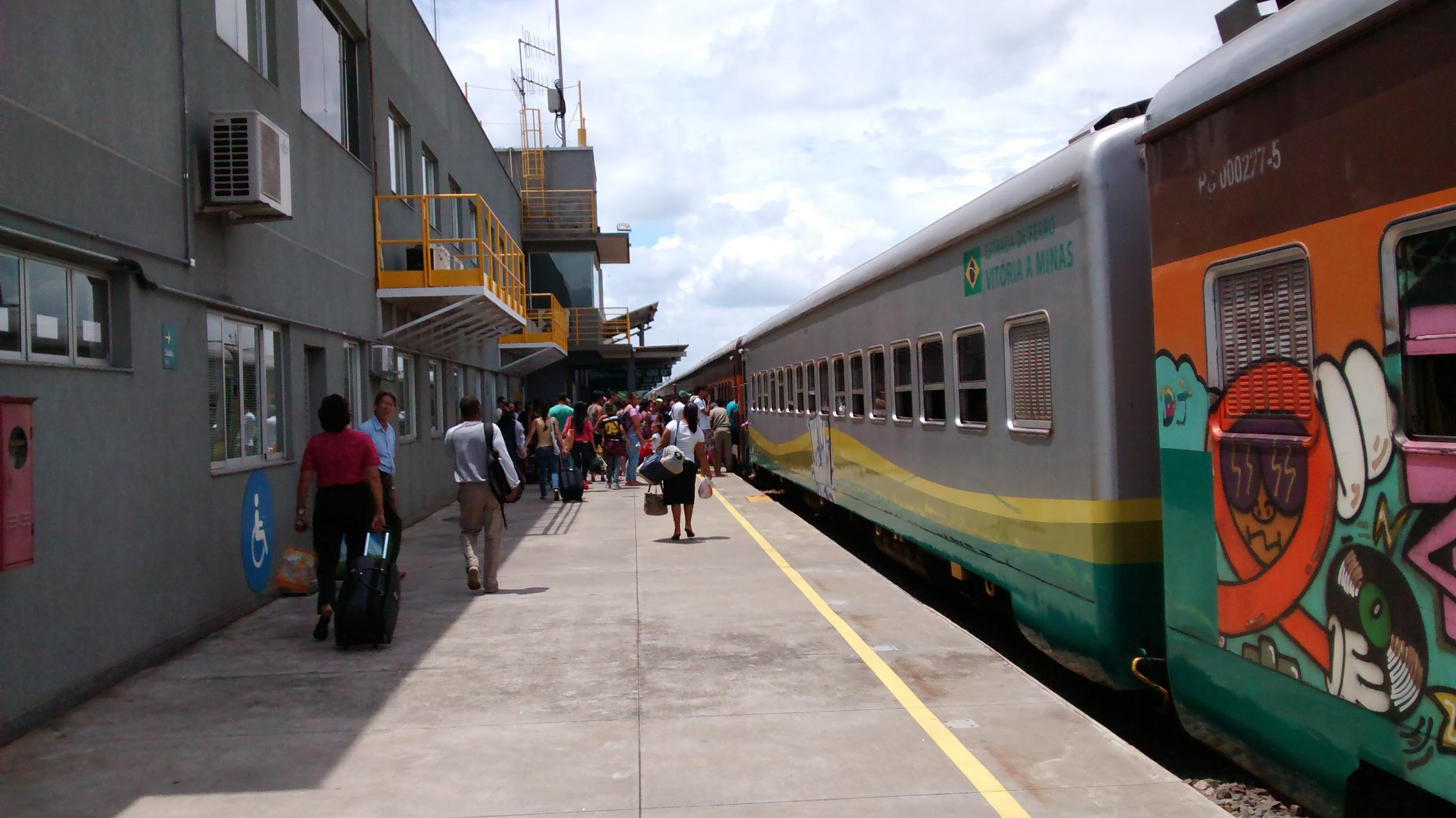
Boarding and disembarking at Intendente Câmara Station in Ipatinga, Minas Gerais.

EFVM is one of the few Brazilian railways to maintain continuous passenger transportation, with around 3,000 users daily, and is also a tourist option. Together with the Carajás Railway (Pará-Maranhão) and the Noroeste do Brasil Railway, it is one of the last railways to provide this service over long distances, maintaining a total of 30 embarkation and disembarkation points in 42 municipalities served along the 664 kilometers covered by the passenger train, transporting an average of around 1 million passengers a year, according to information from 2014.

The train crosses a region with a significant amount of mountains and rivers and typical vegetation alternating between the Atlantic Forest and the Cerrado, with a large part of its length on the banks of the Doce River, until it reaches the beaches of Espírito Santo. During the high season, the train is made up of: 2 locomotives (G12 and G16), 1 generator set, 1 command car, 1 snack car, 4 executive cars and 13 economy class cars. In the low season, the train consists of 2 locomotives (G12 and G16), 1 generator set, 1 command car, 1 snack car, 4 business class cars and 7 economy class cars. In August 2014, the cars were replaced by a new fleet, bought in Romania, which now has a carriage for wheelchair users, air conditioning in all compartments and doors with automatic opening and a presence sensor. In 2019, the fleet that transports passengers on the branch between Itabira and Nova Era was also replaced by a fleet identical to the fleet on the main section.

== Painting phase of the locomotives ==
A brief description of the various painting phases of EFVM locomotives:

- Stylized “Eagle” on the front of the locomotives;
- “Vitória a Minas” in full (simplified);
- “CVRD Flag” both with normal EFVM and in italics;
- “White Chocolate”, use of white, brown and orange as colors;
- “Banco Real”, new colors (green, yellow and white) adopted by the company from 2008.

== See also ==
- Calado station
- Carajás Railway
- Central Railway of Brazil
- Vale S. A.
