= Joanésia =

- Municipality
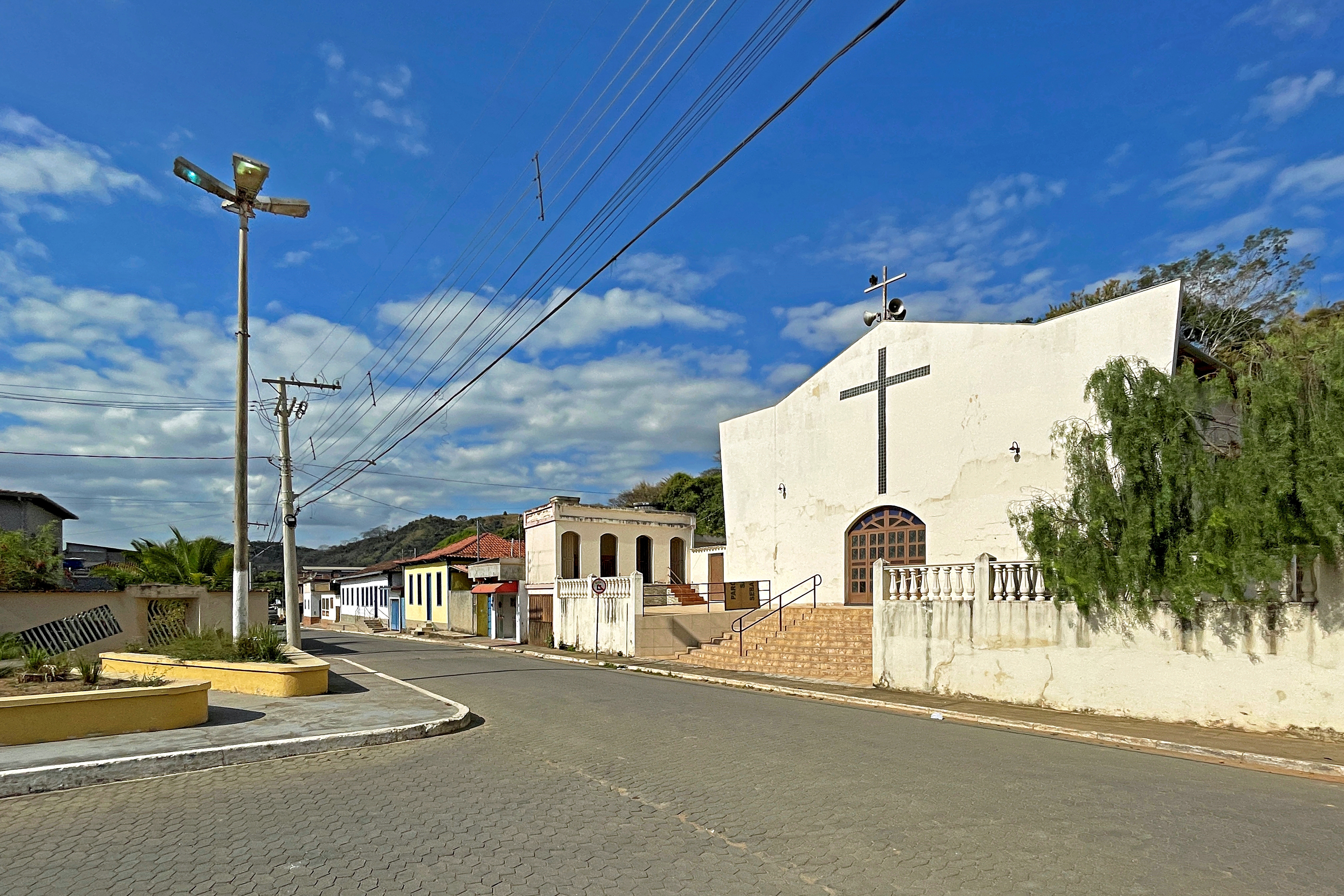
- Square of the Joaquim Dias de Moura Street with the Saint Sebastian Matriz Church on the right

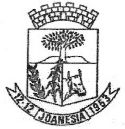
- Coat of arms

- Location in Brazil
- Coordinates: 19°10′19″S 42°40′44″W
- Country: Brazil
- Region: Southeast
- State: Minas Gerais
- Mesoregion: Vale do Rio Doce

Population (2022 Census)
  - Total: 4,329
  - Estimate (2025): 4,246
- Time zone: UTC−3 (BRT)

Joanésia is a municipality in the state of Minas Gerais in the Southeast region of Brazil.

== See also ==
- List of municipalities in Minas Gerais
