= Aperam South America =

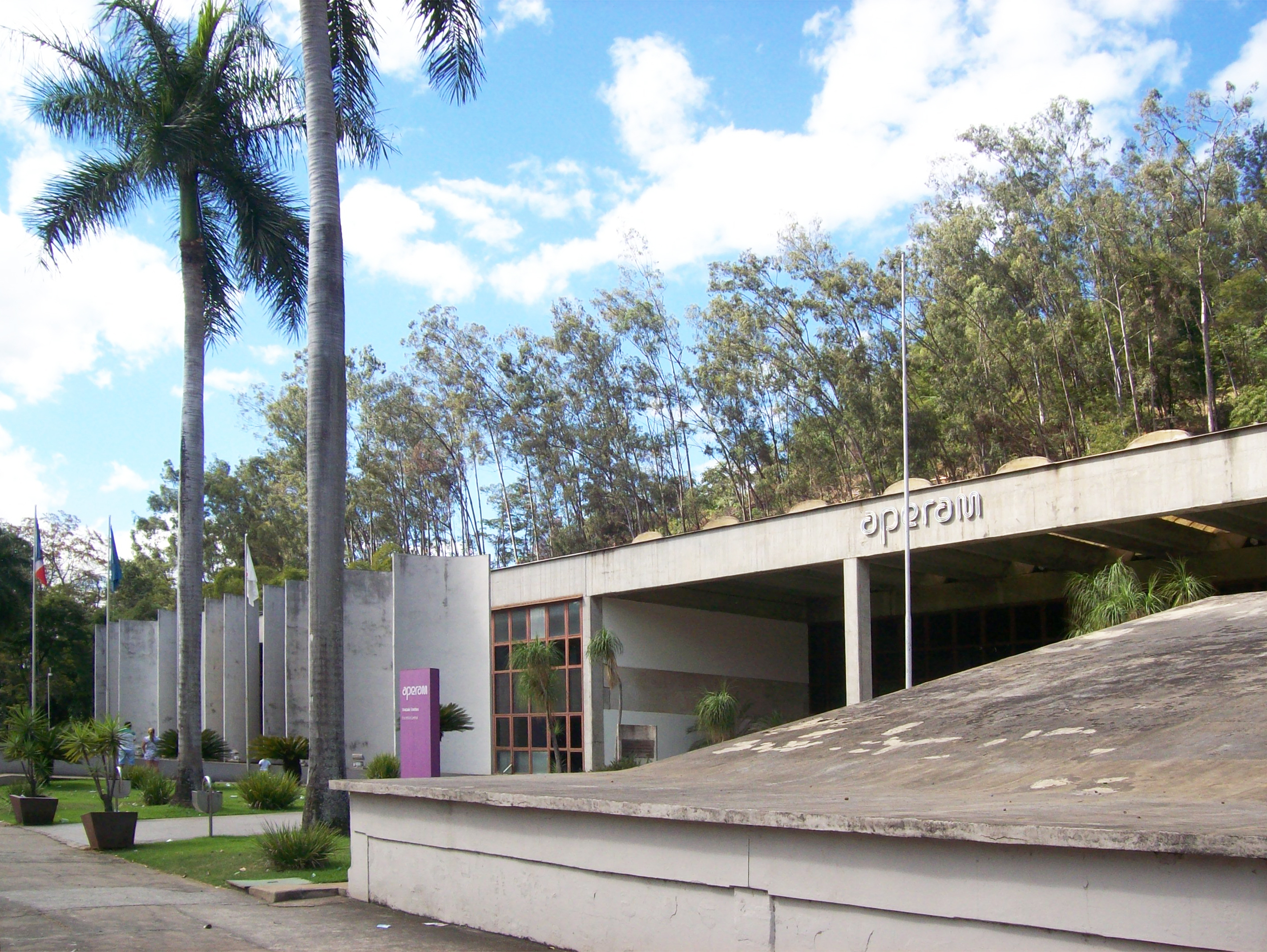
Aperam South America's central headquarter in Timóteo.

Aperam South America, old Acesita and ArcelorMittal Timóteo, is the biggest Brazilian manufacturer of specialty steels. Headquartered in Belo Horizonte, Minas Gerais, the company is a supplier of stainless, silicon and special carbon steels. Aperam South America's steel market share in Brazil is estimated to be 90%, and it is the only stainless steel maker in Latin America. The company's main plant, at Timóteo in Minas Gerais, has an installed production capacity is 900,000 tons of steel per year. The company also mines iron ore.

Aperam South America, then known Acesita, was founded October 31, 1944, among the cofounders was Percival Farquhar and got into the stainless steel business in the late 1970s. It was privatised by the Brazilian government in 1992. The French steel maker Usinor, now part of ArcelorMittal, took a controlling stake in Acesita 1998. In 2007, ArcelorMittal announced the rebranding of Acesita to ArcelorMittal Inox Brasil. The company's stock is traded on Bovespa, where it is part of the Ibovespa index. However, ArcelorMittal announced it would buy out all public stock of ArcelorMittal Inox Brasil, and make it a wholly owned subsidiary.

In January 2011, was incorporated by the Aperam, changing its name to Aperam South America.

== See also ==
- Vale do Aço
