= Chuvisco Falls =

Waterfall in Minas Gerais, Brazil

Coordinates: 19.2861°S 43.2569°W

Chuvisco falls
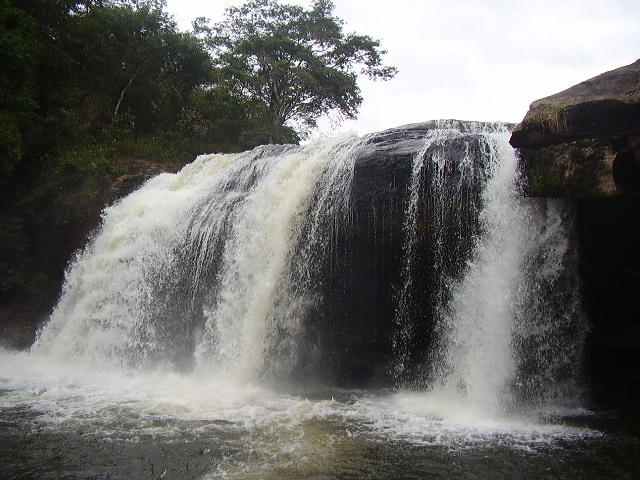
- Interactive map of Chuvisco falls
- Total height: 10 m

Chuvisco Falls is a waterfall in Brazil, located in the Fish River, bordering the municipalities of Santo Antônio do Rio Abaixo and São Sebastião do Rio Preto, in Minas Gerais. It has a 10 meter (30 feet) drop.
