= Santo Antônio River (Doce River tributary) =

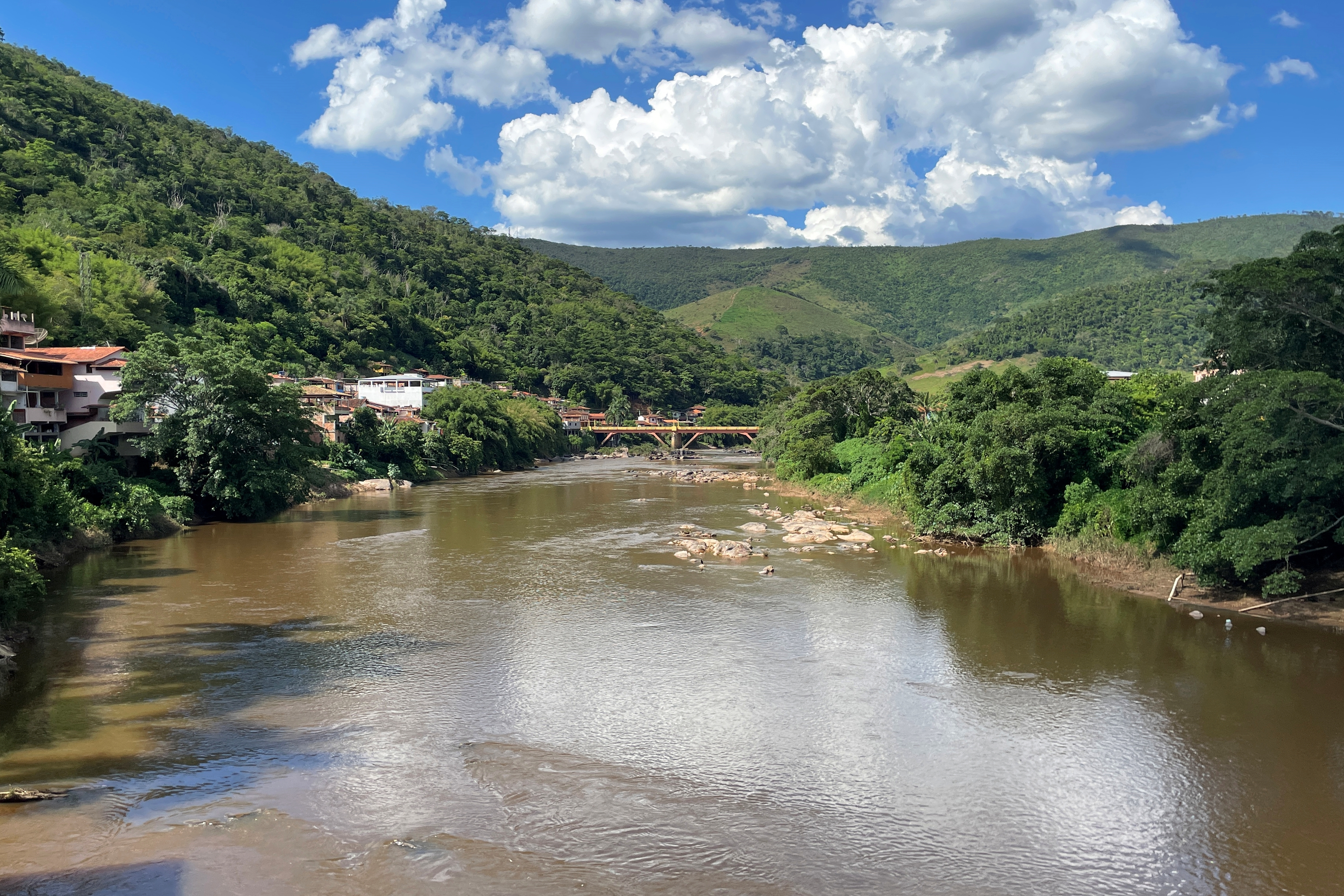
- Santo Antônio River in Ferros

Physical characteristics
- Source
  - location: Conceição do Mato Dentro
- Mouth: Doce River
  - coordinates: 19°14′S 42°19′W
- Length: 287 km (178 mi)

The Santo Antônio River of Brazil rises in the Espinhaço Mountains, in the district of Santo Antônio do Cruzeiro, city of Conceição do Mato Dentro, in the Brazilian state of Minas Gerais. Running to the east, after a journey of 287 km, will pour its waters into the Rio Doce.

The bandeirantes used the river as a transportation route during the Brazil Gold Rush. Today it is used for fishing and gold panning, as well as leisure and tourism.

The Santo Antônio River is notable for its rocky course with a number of waterfalls, including Bahia Falls and Tabuleiro Falls (rated in the 2005 edition of Guia 4 Rodas as the prettiest in Brazil).

== Cities of the basin of Santo Antônio River ==
- Conceição do Mato Dentro
- Morro do Pilar
- Santo Antônio do Rio Abaixo
- São Sebastião do Rio Preto
- Ferros
- Braúnas
- Joanésia
- Açucena
- Mesquita
- Belo Oriente
- Naque
