= Santa Terezinha (Coronel Fabriciano) =

Brazilian neighborhood

- Neighborhood of Coronel Fabriciano
- View of the Santa Terezinha neighborhood

- Location in Minas Gerais Santa Terezinha (Brazil)
- Coordinates: 19°31′18″S 42°37′11″W
- Country: Brazil
- State: Minas Gerais
- Municipality/City: Coronel Fabriciano
- Zone: Senador Melo Viana District

Area
  - Total: 0.3 km^{2} (0.12 sq mi)

Population
  - Total: 1 712
  - Density: 5.316/km^{2} (13.77/sq mi)

Santa Terezinha or Santa Terezinha I is a neighborhood in the Brazilian municipality of Coronel Fabriciano, in the interior of the state of Minas Gerais. It is located in the Senador Melo Viana district, in Sector 1. According to the Brazilian Institute of Geography and Statistics (IBGE), its population in 2010 was 1 712 inhabitants (2.0% of the municipality's total), distributed over an area of 0.3 km^{2}.

The neighborhood was created in the 1960s after the area, which belonged to former Mayor Rubem Siqueira Maia, was allotted. At the end of the 1980s, the Church of Saint Theresa was built and became one of the main venues for activities and events for the population.

== History ==
In the middle of the 19th century, there was a small port at the mouth of the Caladão Stream, where goods and people were shipped to neighboring settlements via the Piracicaba River. At the end of the 1910s, when the Vitória-Minas Railway (EFVM) and the Calado Station were built, the population grew as workers settled in the area, forming the current central zone of Coronel Fabriciano.

The area where the Santa Terezinha neighborhood is located, as well as the neighboring Santa Terezinha II and the region encompassed by the Aldeia do Lago and Mangueiras districts, belonged to the doctor Rubem Siqueira Maia, who was the first mayor of Coronel Fabriciano. The land was part of the Santa Terezinha Farm, named by Rubem and his daughter-in-law, Idalina Winter, after the saint of the same name. The site was allotted in 1964 by Imobiliária Santa Terezinha, owned by the Maia family, giving rise to the neighborhoods.

In the 1980s, after the urban center had been consolidated, discussions began in favor of building a chapel. A plot of land was provided by the City Hall and the Church of Saint Theresa was built in 1988, through the donations and collective actions. The then parish priest, Father Élio Ataíde, donated the chairs for the church, which underwent renovations two decades later and was reopened in 2014.

== Geography and demography ==
The Santa Terezinha neighborhood has a total area of 0.3 km^{2} and is bordered by Bom Jesus (to the north), Santa Helena (to the west), Caladinho, Aparecida do Norte (to the east) and Santa Terezinha II and the municipality of Timóteo (to the south). It covers the area where the Caladão Stream flows into the Piracicaba River. Although the neighborhood is bordered by the creek, flooding is not frequent in this stretch, as the accumulated water drains into the Piracicaba. There are trees on Julita Pires Bretas Avenue, which divides the Santa Terezinha and Santa Helena neighborhoods. In the upper part, landslides occasionally occur in areas on the edge of slopes.

In 2010, the Brazilian Institute of Geography and Statistics (IBGE) estimated that 887 inhabitants lived in the neighborhood, which is comparable to cities in Minas Gerais such as São Sebastião do Rio Preto and Paiva. Among the 63 neighborhoods in Fabriciano, Santa Terezinha ranked 21st in terms of population, comprising 2.0% of the municipal population and 3.7% of the population of the Senador Melo Viana district, with a population density of 5,316.77 inhabitants per square kilometer. Of the total number of inhabitants, 809 were men (47.2% of the total) and 903 women (52.8%), distributed in 560 households. The Church of Saint Theresa is the headquarters of the Community of Santa Terezinha, whose Catholic pastoral work is subordinate to the Parish of Saint Sebastian, under the jurisdiction of the Diocese of Itabira-Fabriciano.

== Infrastructure and leisure ==
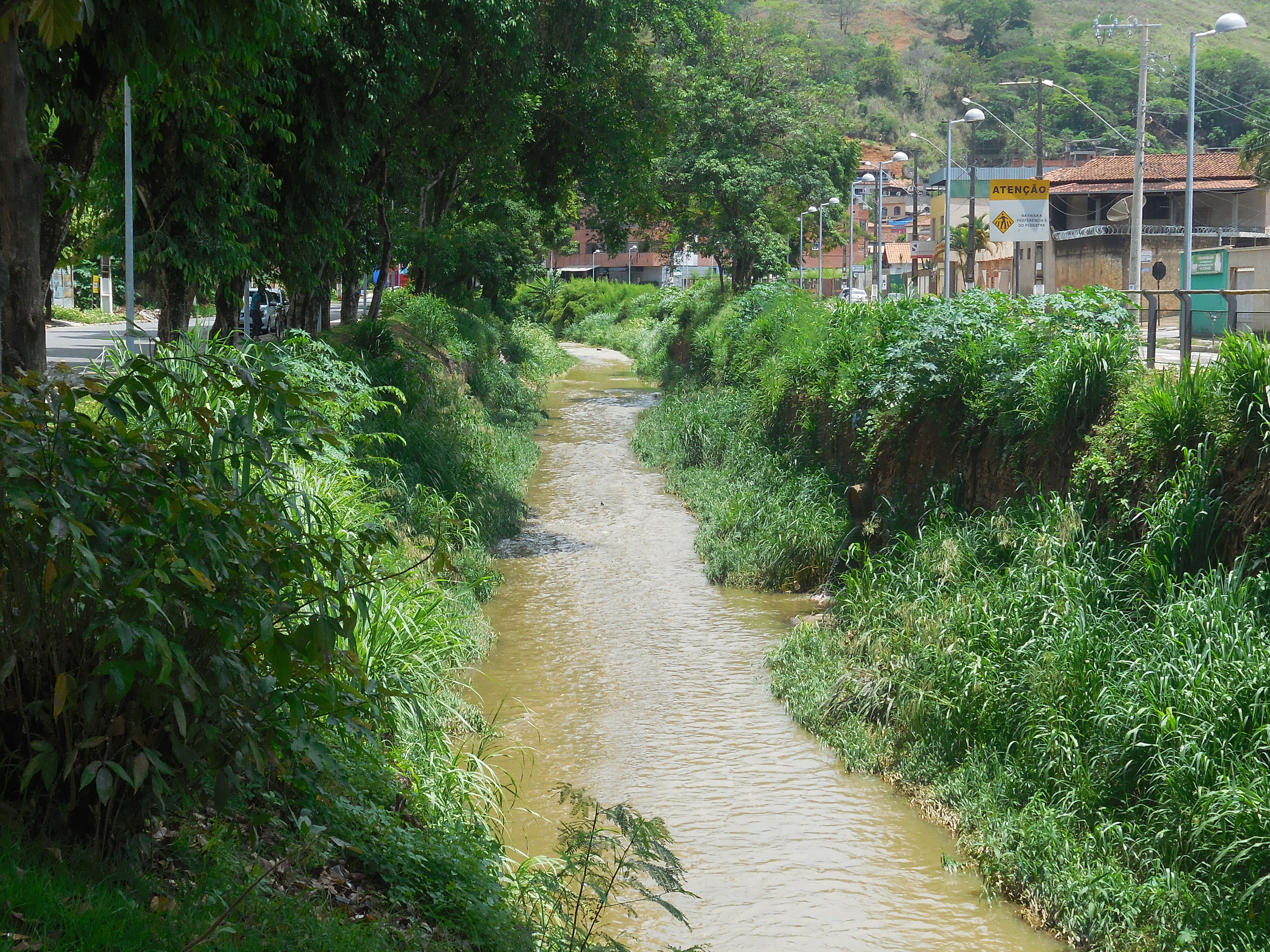
Caladão Stream between the Santa Helena and Santa Terezinha neighborhoods.

The water supply service is provided by Companhia de Saneamento de Minas Gerais (Copasa), while the electricity supply is the responsibility of Companhia Energética de Minas Gerais (Cemig), with 100% of the population having access to the electricity network. There are schools and health facilities in the surrounding neighborhoods and in the central area of the city. No buses pass through the neighborhood, except on Rubem Siqueira Maia and Julita Pires Bretas avenues.

The Church of Saint Theresa is one of the main buildings in the Santa Terezinha neighborhood. The Catholic community occasionally organizes leisure activities for the population, including typical food stalls and musical shows, as well as providing space for campaigns and events. The Feast of Saint Theresa, celebrated annually in October with processions, masses and special celebrations and a novena in honor of the community's patron saint, as well as concerts, is notable. The singing duo Leslie and Laurie, who performed for the first time in the church choir in 2008, stood out in musical performances around the city. In 2016, they were finalists in the first season of the Brazilian edition of The Voice Kids, a talent show promoted by TV Globo.

The Paulo Paulino Ribeiro Pitch, located next to the church, was restructured by the City Hall in 2008. It is named after a resident who developed social and sports work in the residential area and created the Náscoli, a local amateur soccer team. A 9 meter high image of the Divine Mercy was installed in the highest part of the neighborhood. The statue, installed by the Parish of Saint Sebastian in 2013, can be observed from different parts of downtown Fabriciano.

== Gallery ==
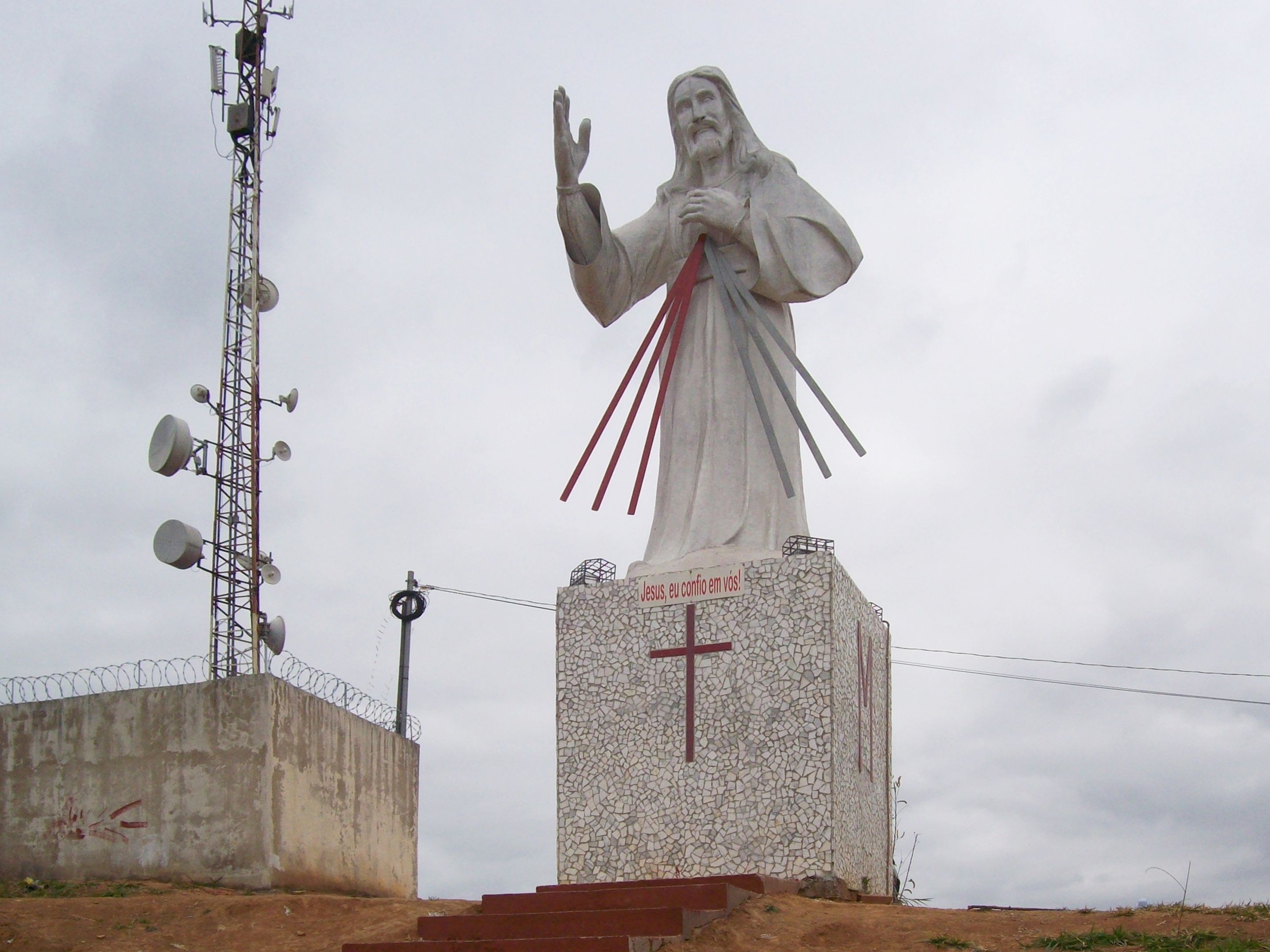
View of the Divine Mercy monument.

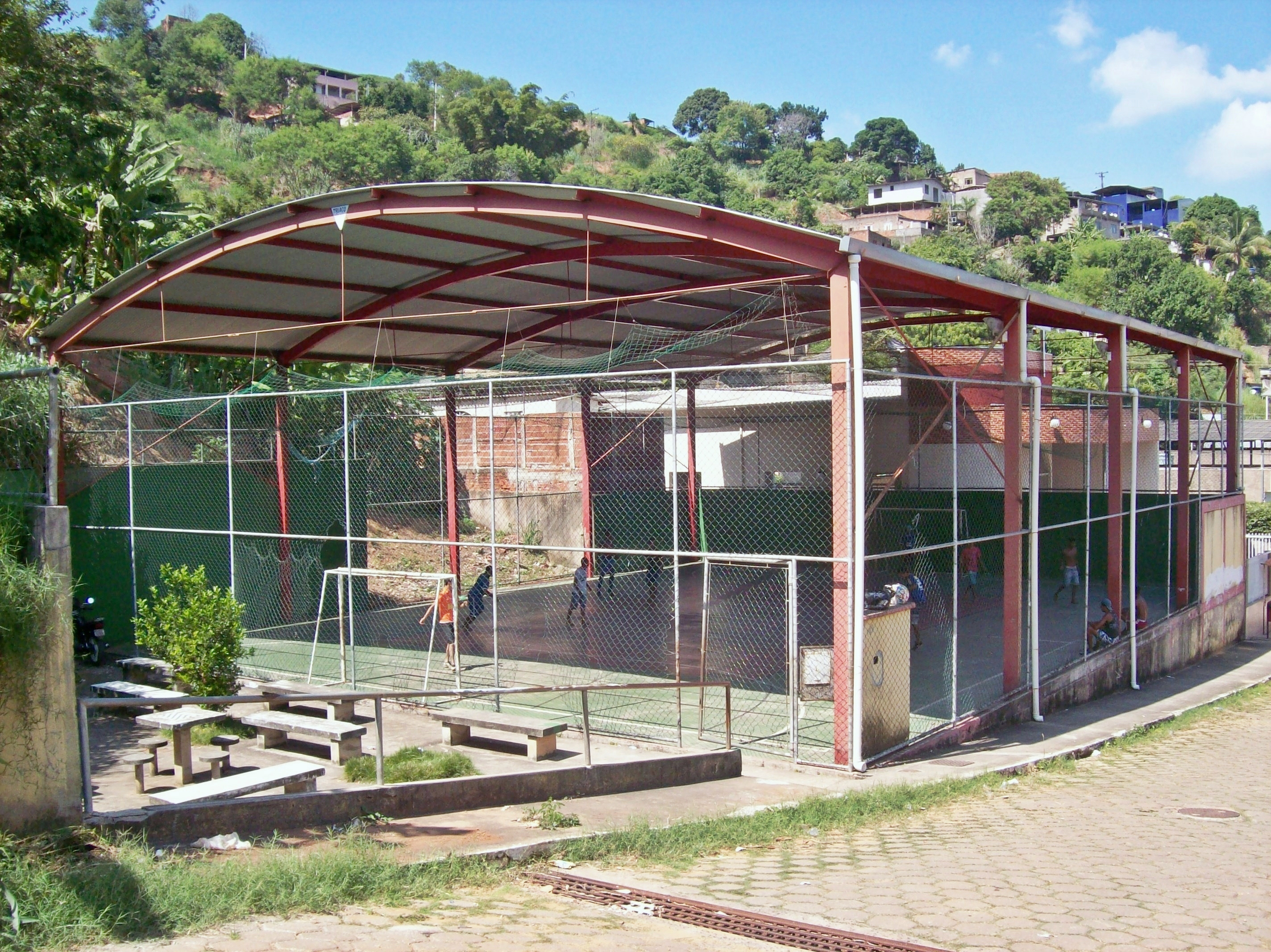
View of the Paulo Paulino Ribeiro Pitch.

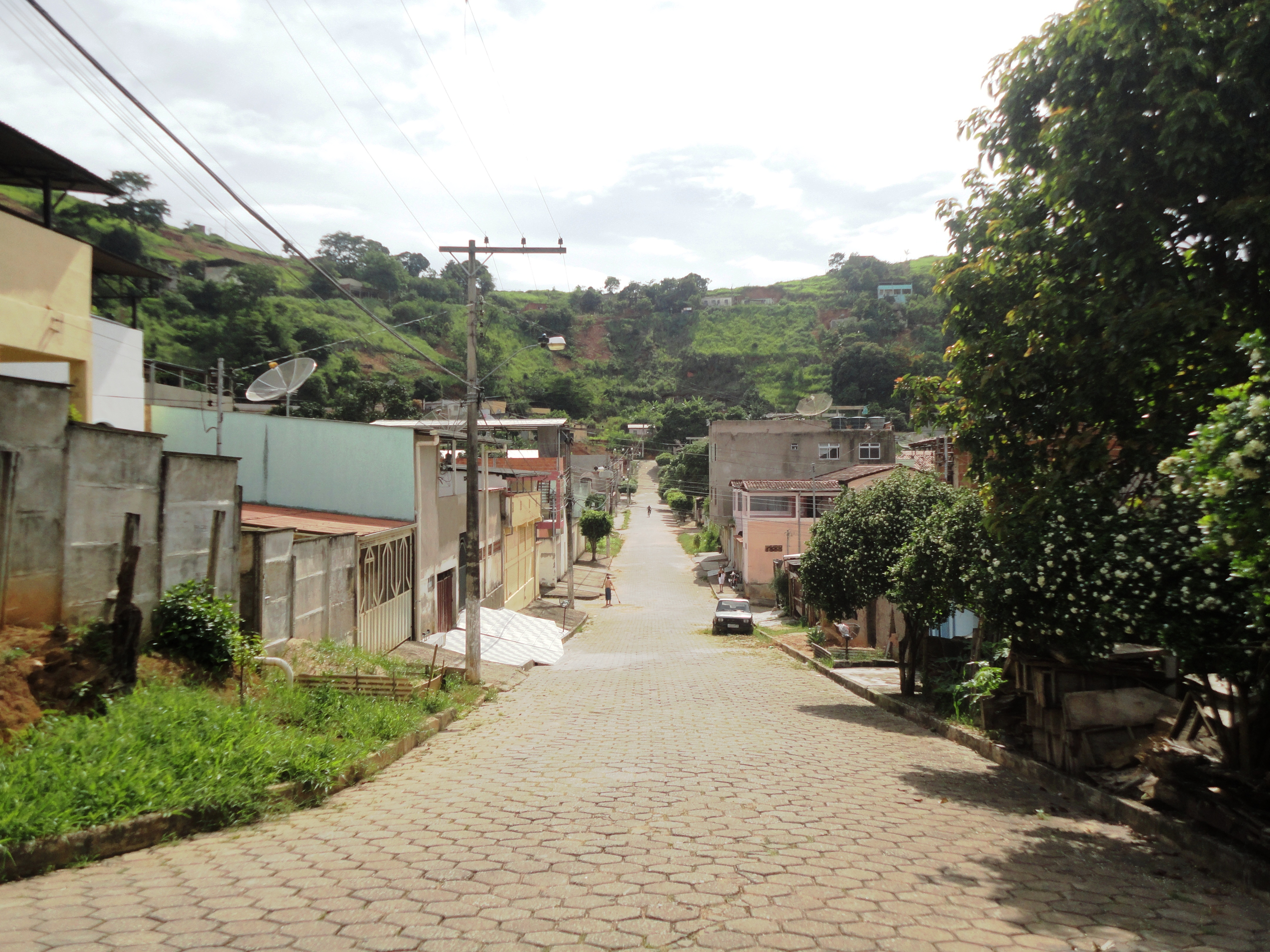
Street in the Santa Terezinha Neighborhood.

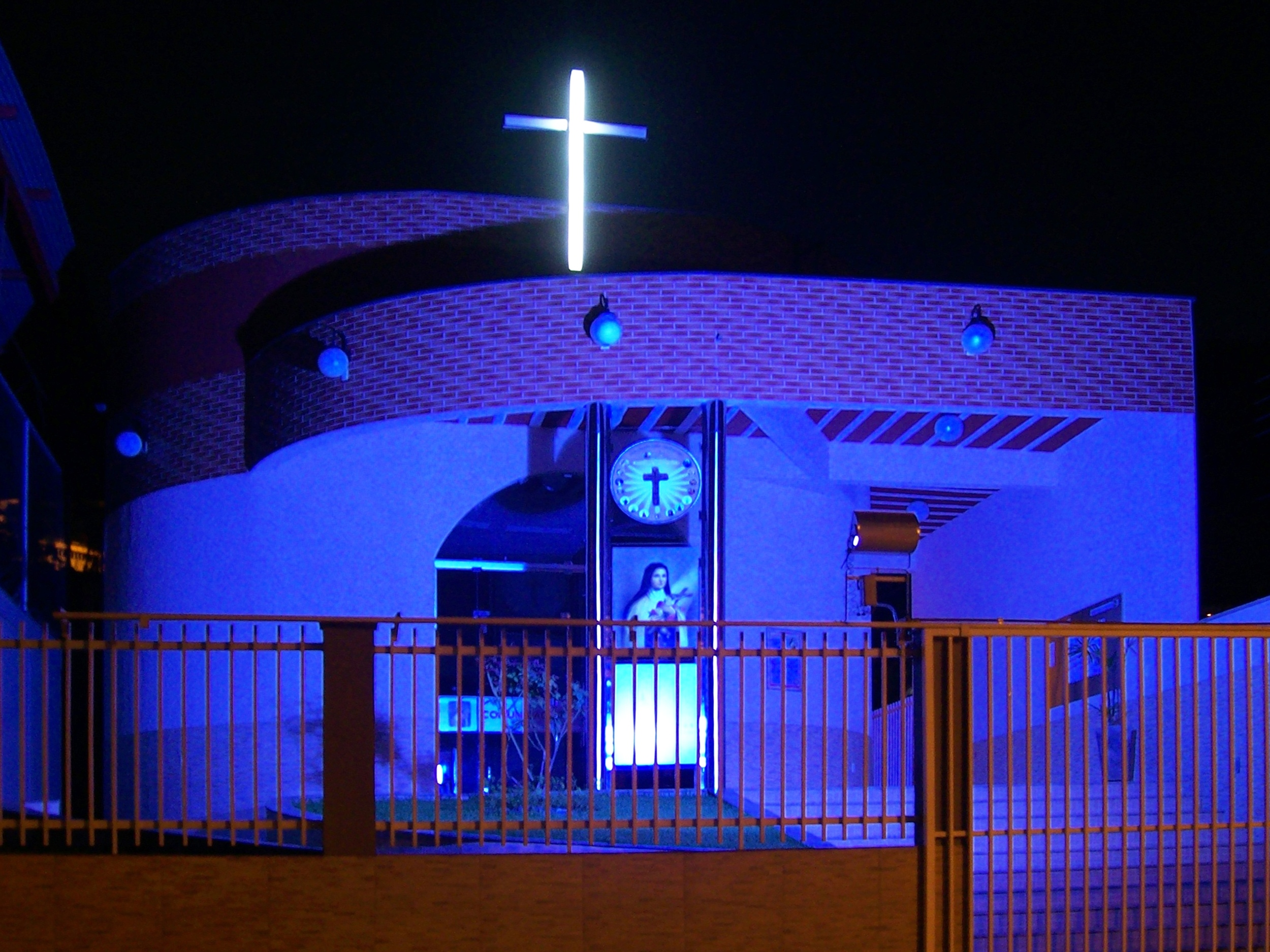
Nocturn view of the Church of Saint Theresa.

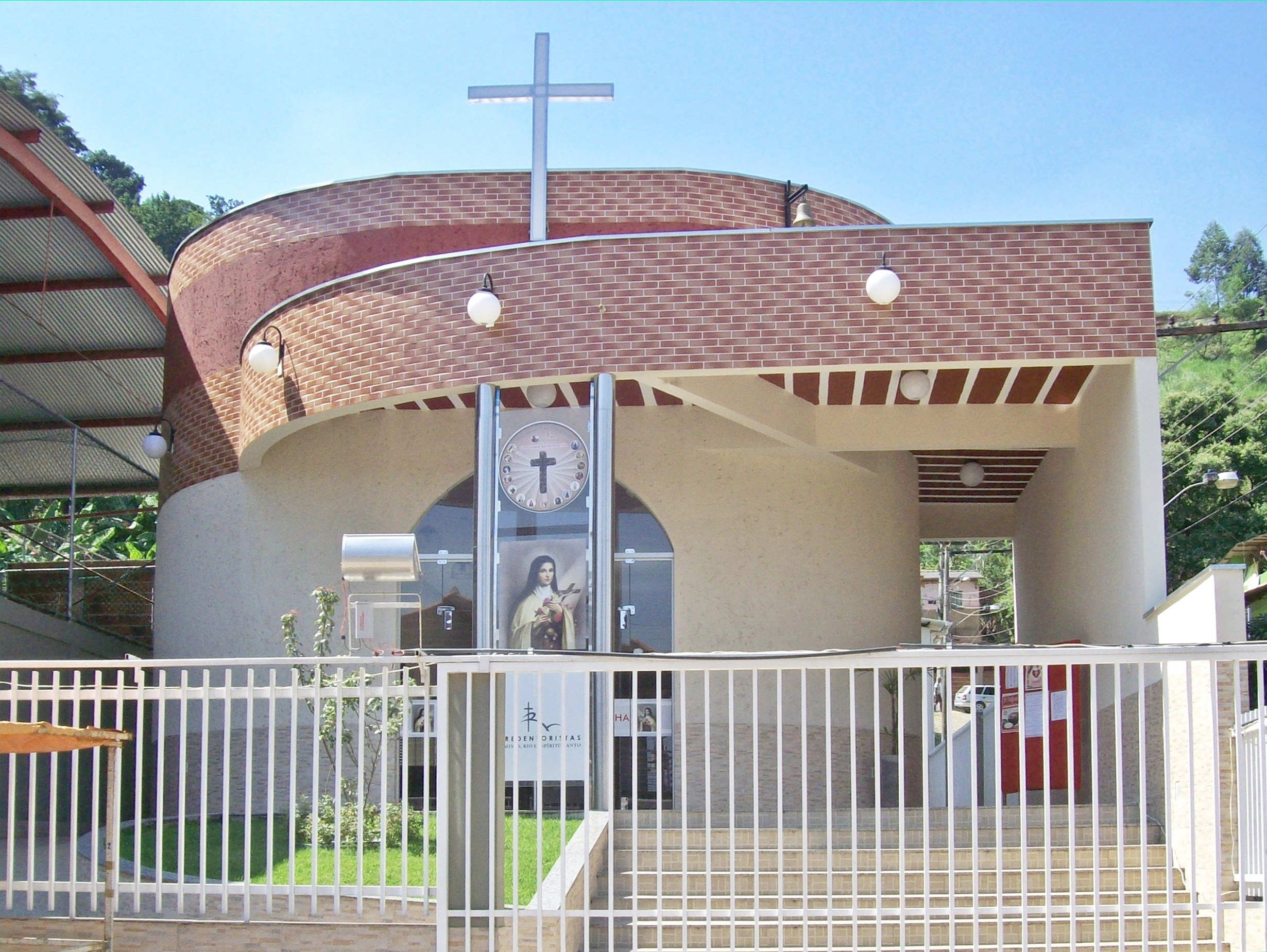
Front of the Church of Saint Theresa.

== See also ==
- List of neighborhoods of Coronel Fabriciano
- History of Coronel Fabriciano
