= Cristal Mountains (Brazil) =

Mountain range in Brazil

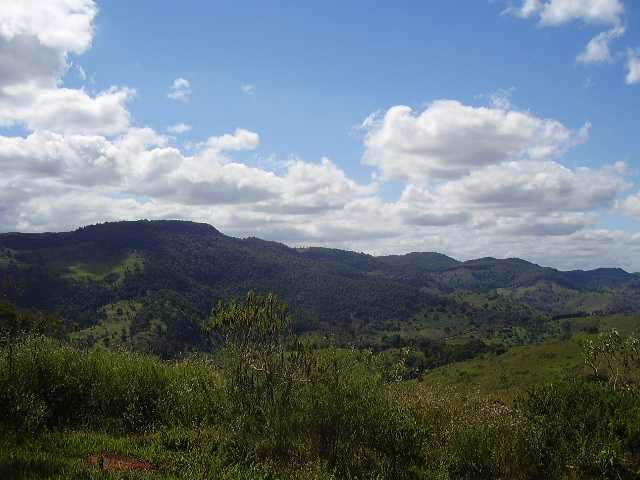
Cristal mountains, also known as Santo Antônio mountains.

Cristal Mountains (Portuguese: Serra do Cristal), also known as Santo Antônio Mountains, are located in Brazil, in the state of Minas Gerais.

One of the tourist points of interests of the mountain range are Cristal Falls, they have 20 metres (66 ft) of height.
