= Cristal Falls (Brazil) =

Coordinates: 19.206°S 43.242°W

Cristal falls
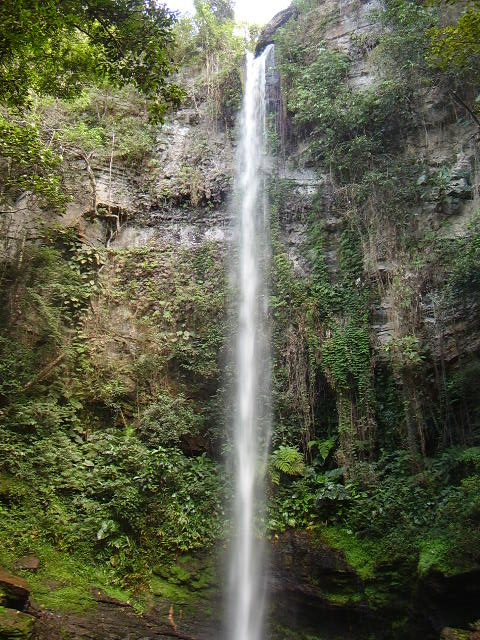
- Interactive map of Cristal falls
- Total height: 20 m (66 ft)

Cristal Falls is a waterfall in the Cristal Mountains of Brazil. It is located in the city of Santo Antônio do Rio Abaixo in the state of Minas Gerais. It is approximately 20 m (66 ft) high.

The waterfall is also known locally as "Cachoeira dos Cristais" and is a popular natural attraction near Biribiri Park, where visitors can swim and hike.
