= Bahia Falls =

Coordinates: 19.236°S 43.218°W

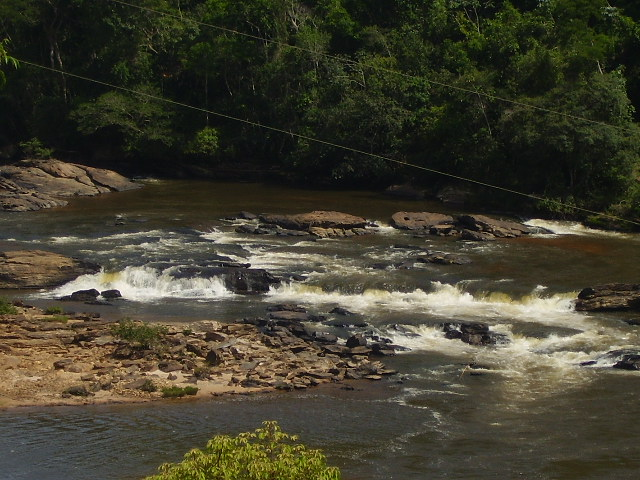
- Interactive map of Bahia Falls
- Total height: 4 m (13 ft)

Bahia Falls is a waterfall on the Santo Antônio River, in city of Santo Antônio do Rio Abaixo, in the state of Minas Gerais in Brazil. It has about 4 m (13 ft) of height.

The waterfall has three different forms: Cascade, chains and rapids (the main waterfalls are cascades and current, the rapids are seen below).
