= Saint Sebastian Parish, Coronel Fabriciano =

Catholic Institution in Brazil

Saint Sebastian Parish
- Paróquia São Sebastião
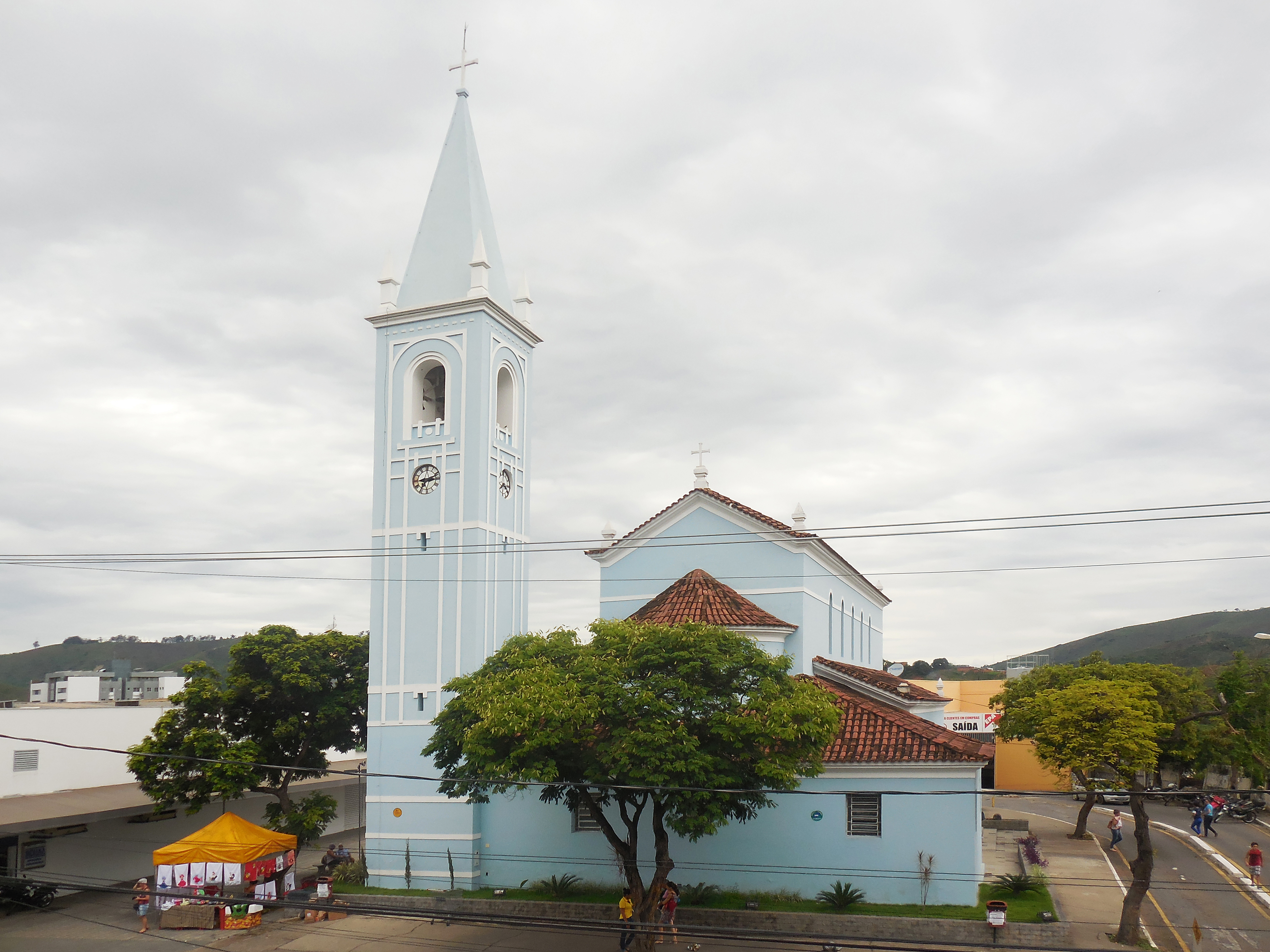
- View of the Parish Church of Saint Sebastian from the residence of the Redemptorist Missionaries of Coronel Fabriciano

Religion
- Affiliation: Catholic
- Ownership: Diocese of Itabira-Fabriciano

Location
- Municipality: Coronel Fabriciano
- State: Minas Gerais

Website
- https://www.saosebastiaofabriciano.com.br/

Saint Sebastian Parish is a division of the Catholic Church based in the Brazilian city of Coronel Fabriciano, in the interior of the state of Minas Gerais. The parish is part of the Diocese of Itabira-Fabriciano, and is located in Pastoral Region III. Its mother church is the Saint Sebastian Parish Church and its territory houses the co-cathedral of Saint Sebastian, which is one of the diocesan headquarters.

Its emancipation process began at the request of Dom Helvécio Gomes de Oliveira, archbishop of Mariana, in 1942, being created on August 15, 1948. However, the devotion to Saint Sebastian as patron saint goes back to the end of the 1920s, when the first church was built in the then village of Calado, which corresponds to the current downtown Fabriciano (Centro neighborhood). Since its installation, the parish has been managed by the Congregation of the Most Holy Redeemer.

Its actions go beyond the administration of the Catholic Church in the surrounding communities. Through its social ministries, the parish also maintains programs and projects aimed at fighting social inequality and defending social and basic rights, as well as promoting the maintenance of local events and religious traditions.

== History ==
=== Origins ===
The first religious to work regularly in Coronel Fabriciano was Father Francisco Dias Fonseca, known as Father Chico. As vicar of Jaguaraçu, he visited the villages of Calado (now downtown Coronel Fabriciano) and Santo Antônio de Piracicaba (now Melo Viana neighborhood) monthly from 1923. On these occasions, masses, baptisms, anointing of the sick, and confessions took place. He was responsible for the construction of the first church in Calado, which occurred in 1929. The temple was located where the Parish Hall is today, near the current Parish Church.

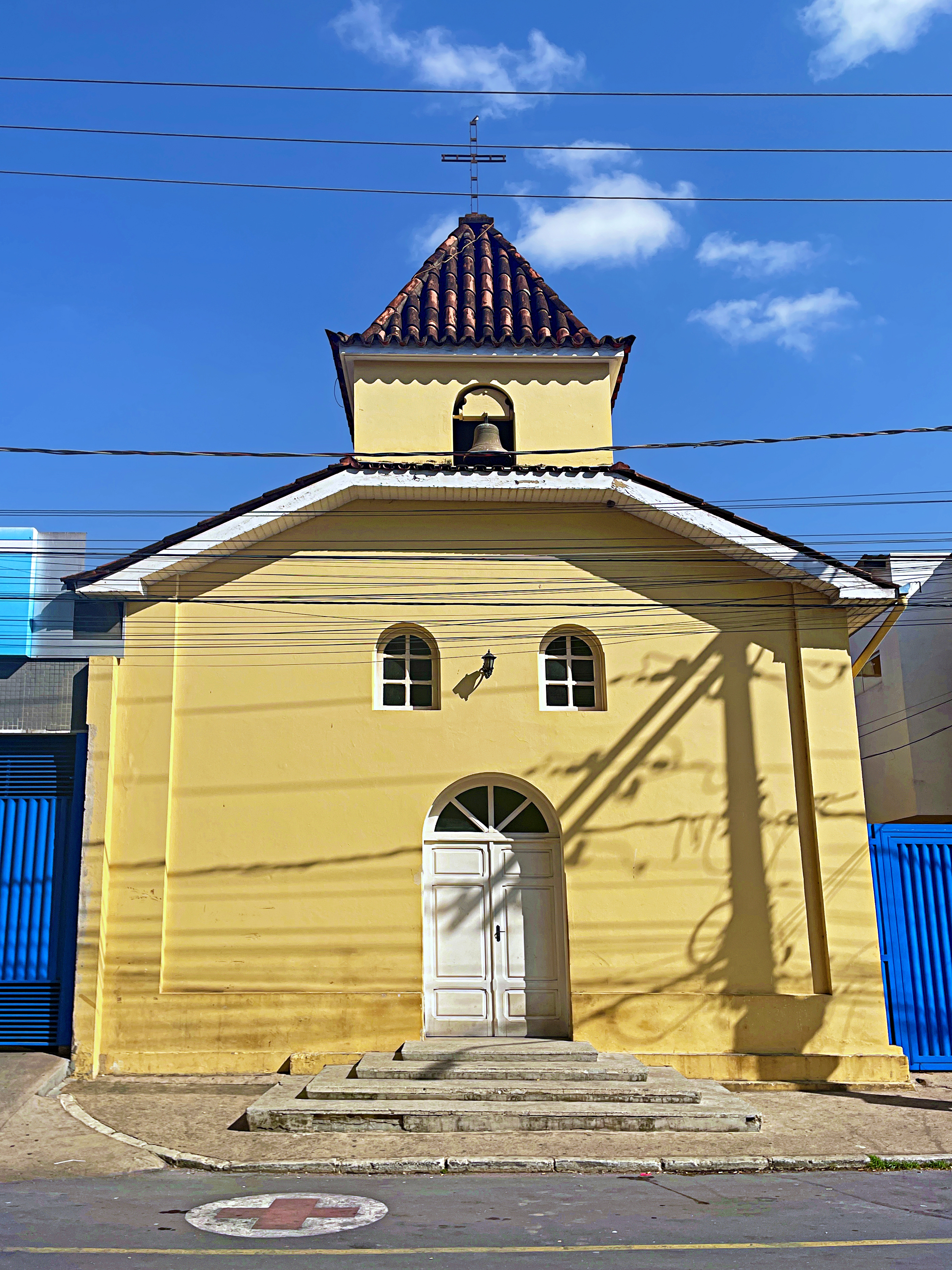
The Our Lady Help of Christians chapel (1938), in the Doutor José Maria Morais Hospital, is the oldest church in the parish still standing.

The construction of the church in the village, which developed around the Calado Station complex, consolidated the celebrations and first Catholic religious manifestations of the local community, dedicated to Saint Sebastian in honor of the residents' devotion. At the time, the merchant Rotildino Avelino ordered an image of the martyr from Rio de Janeiro, which was later enthroned on the main altar, giving rise to the first celebrations in honor of the patron saint. It was Rotildino who influenced Father Francisco Dias to choose St. Sebastian as his patron saint. The activities and celebrations were subordinated to the Parish of Our Lady of Nazareth, located in Antônio Dias.

=== Emancipation ===
The population and structural impulse of the current downtown Fabriciano area (Centro neighborhood) was due in principle to the installation of the Belgo-Mineira industrial complex in 1936 and Acesita in 1944. In 1938, Canon Domingos Martins arrived in the town, and was the first priest to reside permanently in the village to work as a chaplain at the Belgo-Mineira Hospital (now Doutor José Maria Morais Hospital). The celebrations took place both in the hospital chapel (Our Lady Help of Christians chapel) and in the old church. At the same time, the regular practice of Ash Wednesday mass (1939), Coronation of Mary (1939), Holy Week celebrations (1946), and processions and assembly of Corpus Christi carpets (1946) began. In 1942, Domingos Martins was replaced by Father Alípio Martins Pinheiro, who initiated the process of emancipation of the community at the request of Dom Helvécio Gomes de Oliveira, Archbishop of Mariana.

In 1946, Father Alípio was replaced by Father Deolindo Coelho, who continued the procedures for the creation of the parish. In that same year, the construction of a new church was started, to replace the old one, which was about to collapse. On August 15, 1948, after the arrival of the Redemptorist Missionaries, Saint Sebastian Parish was created, marking the establishment of the first religious institution based in the current Vale do Aço Metropolitan Region. The date was chosen by Dom Helvécio himself because it was the day of Assumption of Mary. He also helped in the preparations for the festive ceremony, coming from João Monlevade by the Vitória-Minas Railway four days in advance. On the cold and sunny morning of that August 15, a Sunday, Dom Helvécio celebrated a mass in the courtyard of the current Parish Church of Saint Sebastian, which was still under construction, attended by local political and religious authorities. The administration was granted to the Redemptorist Missionaries and Father José Gonçalves da Costa was named parish priest, assisted by Father André Van Der Arendt. This was followed by a luncheon for the religious and guests at the Casa de Campo (English: Country House) and, at the end of the day, a procession in honor of Our Lady.

=== Consolidation ===
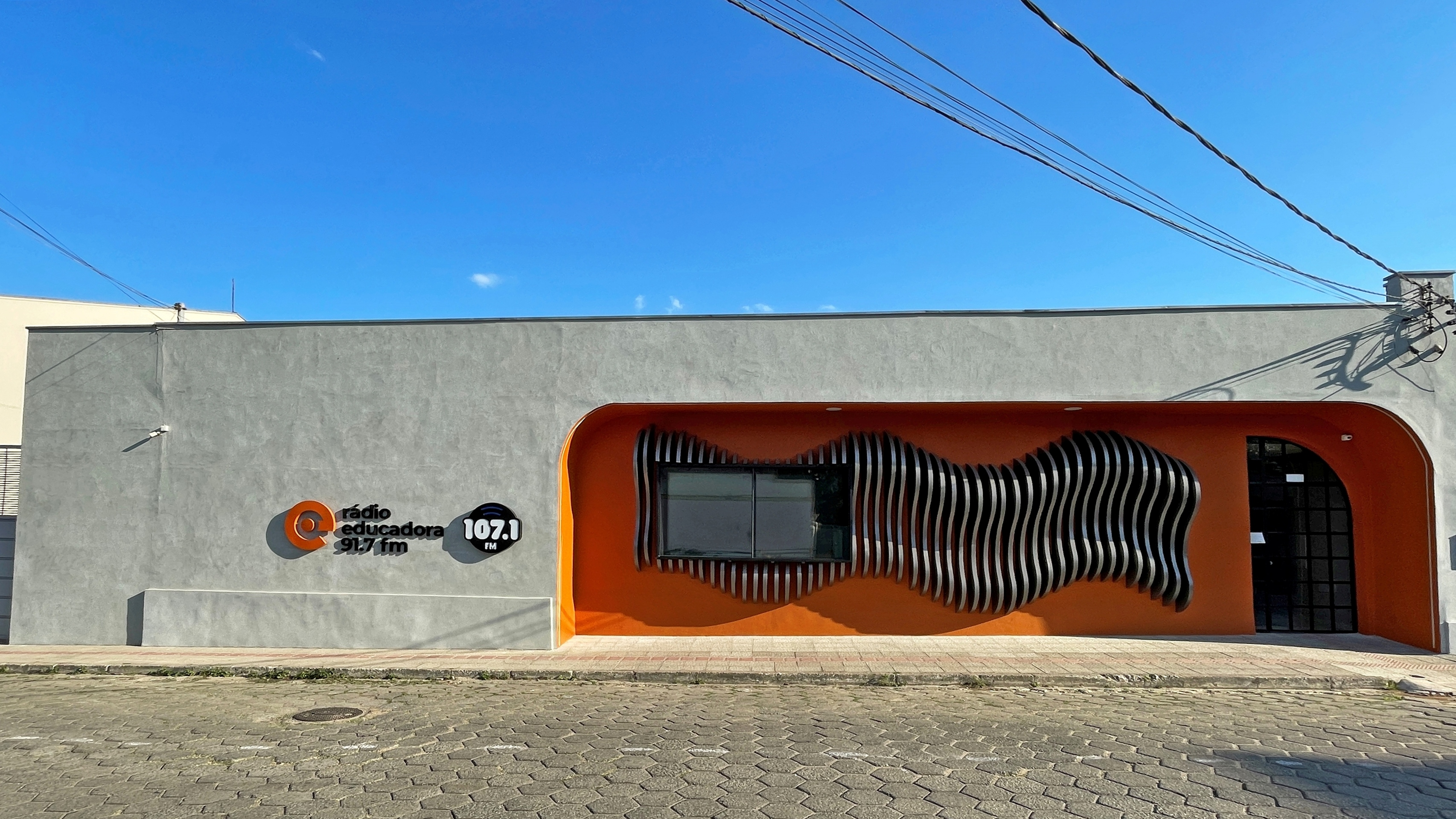
Head office of the Educadora radio, the first radio station in Vale do Aço, created by the Redemptorists in 1968.

Coronel Fabriciano was emancipated from Antônio Dias on December 27, 1948, with Father Deolindo Coelho leading the pro-emancipation commission. It was Deolindo who traveled by train to Belo Horizonte in order to prove to the state deputies that the municipality had the minimum number of inhabitants required for it to be emancipated, incorporating the church's baptismal records into the count, at the suggestion of then deputy Tancredo Neves. The town's old church collapsed after a heavy rainstorm on January 10, 1949. The image of Saint Sebastian from the temple was rescued intact by Rotildino Avelino himself, who had donated it in 1929, remaining preserved by the family since then; later a second image was donated by Rotildino for the new church. In August 1949, the Parish Church of Saint Sebastian was inaugurated.

The Parish Hall, stage for activities and events of the parish and the city, was built on the site of the collapsed church and inaugurated on September 26, 1959. The Parish House, the residence of the Redemptorist Missionaries in the city, was built in front of the Parish Church and next to the Parish Hall, and was inaugurated by the then vicar, Father Quintiliano Borges in 1966. The building also served as the headquarters of Educadora radio, the first radio station in the region, created in 1968 by the Redemptorists, until 1996, when the current premises of the station were built.

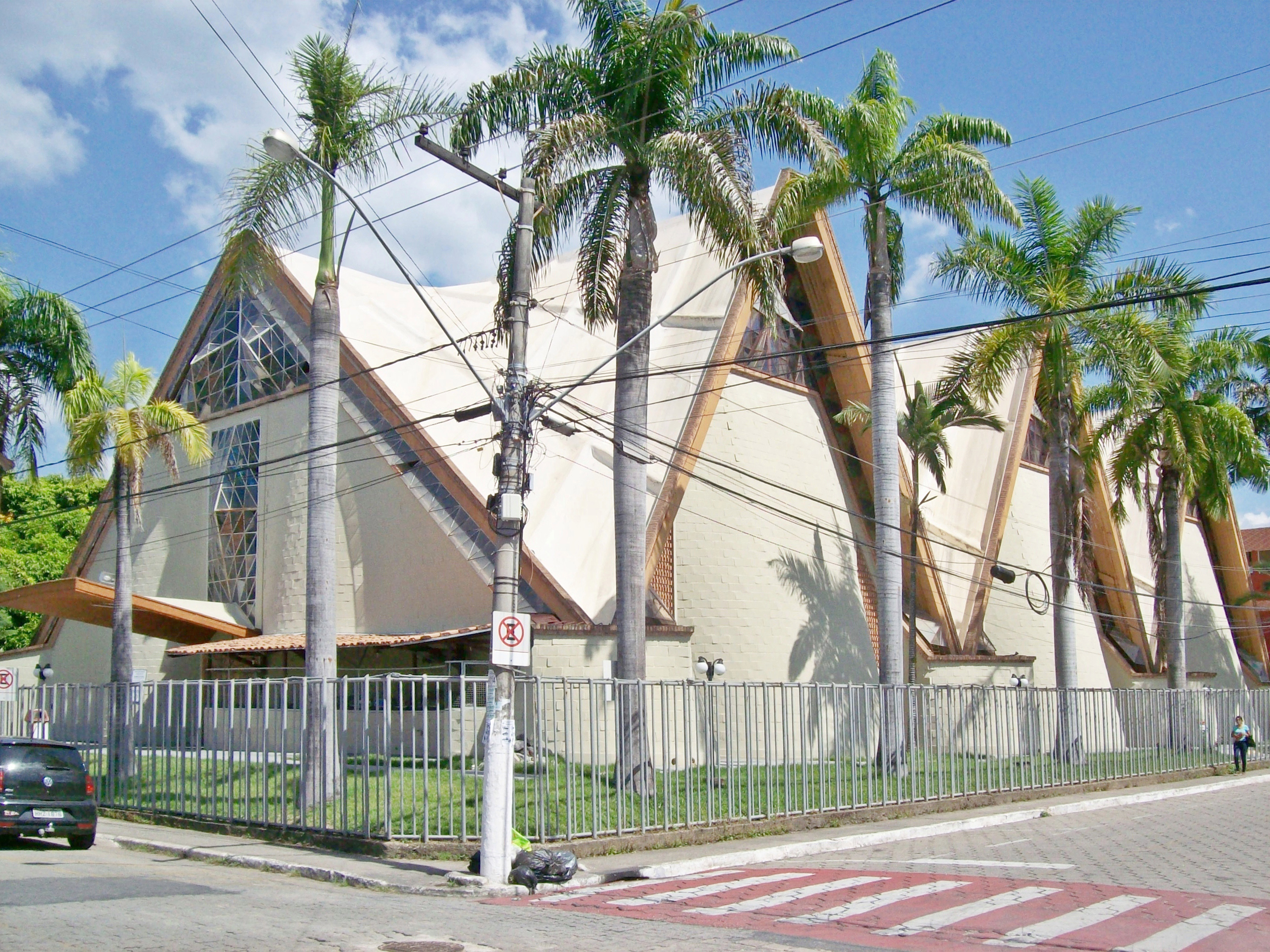
The Saint Sebastian Cathedral, one of the diocesan seats in the parish territory, consecrated in 1993.

The parishes of Our Lady of Hope, representing the then district of Ipatinga in 1960, and St. Joseph and Saint Sebastian, in the then district of Timóteo in 1959 and 1963, respectively, were dismembered from Saint Sebastian Parish. The Saint Anthony Parish, dismembered on January 20, 1963, became the district of Senador Melo Viana and the municipal rural area. These dismemberments occurred after the growth of the respective communities, giving more autonomy to the neighboring towns and outlying neighborhoods.

Dom Lélis Lara, appointed parish priest on February 14, 1971, was responsible for reforms in the Parish Church. In the following decades he worked in several community fronts in Coronel Fabriciano, as the director of Educadora radio, Scout Group, and social projects. His episcopal consecration, received on February 2, 1977, was celebrated in a ceremony in the courtyard of Colégio Angélica. He was responsible for preventing the closure of the current Unileste in the early 1990s, and of Colégio Angélica in 2016, already as bishop-emeritus. His death on December 8, 2016, at the age of 90, caused a strong commotion inside and outside the city.

On June 1, 1979, Coronel Fabriciano was declared as one of the seats of the then Diocese of Itabira, which became the Diocese of Itabira-Fabriciano; with this, the function of co-cathedral was assigned to the Parish Church. However, the construction of a larger temple was necessary due to overcrowding. Therefore, on July 4, 1993, the Saint Sebastian Cathedral was inaugurated in the Santa Helena neighborhood, and has been a diocesan co-cathedral ever since. The image of Saint Sebastian in the cathedral was a donation of José Avelino Barbosa, son of Rotildino Avelino, who donated the images of the first church of the city and of the Parish Church. On May 9, 2021, the emancipation of the Our Lady of Fatima Parish took place, with its headquarters in the Caladinho neighborhood.

== Communities and Subordination ==
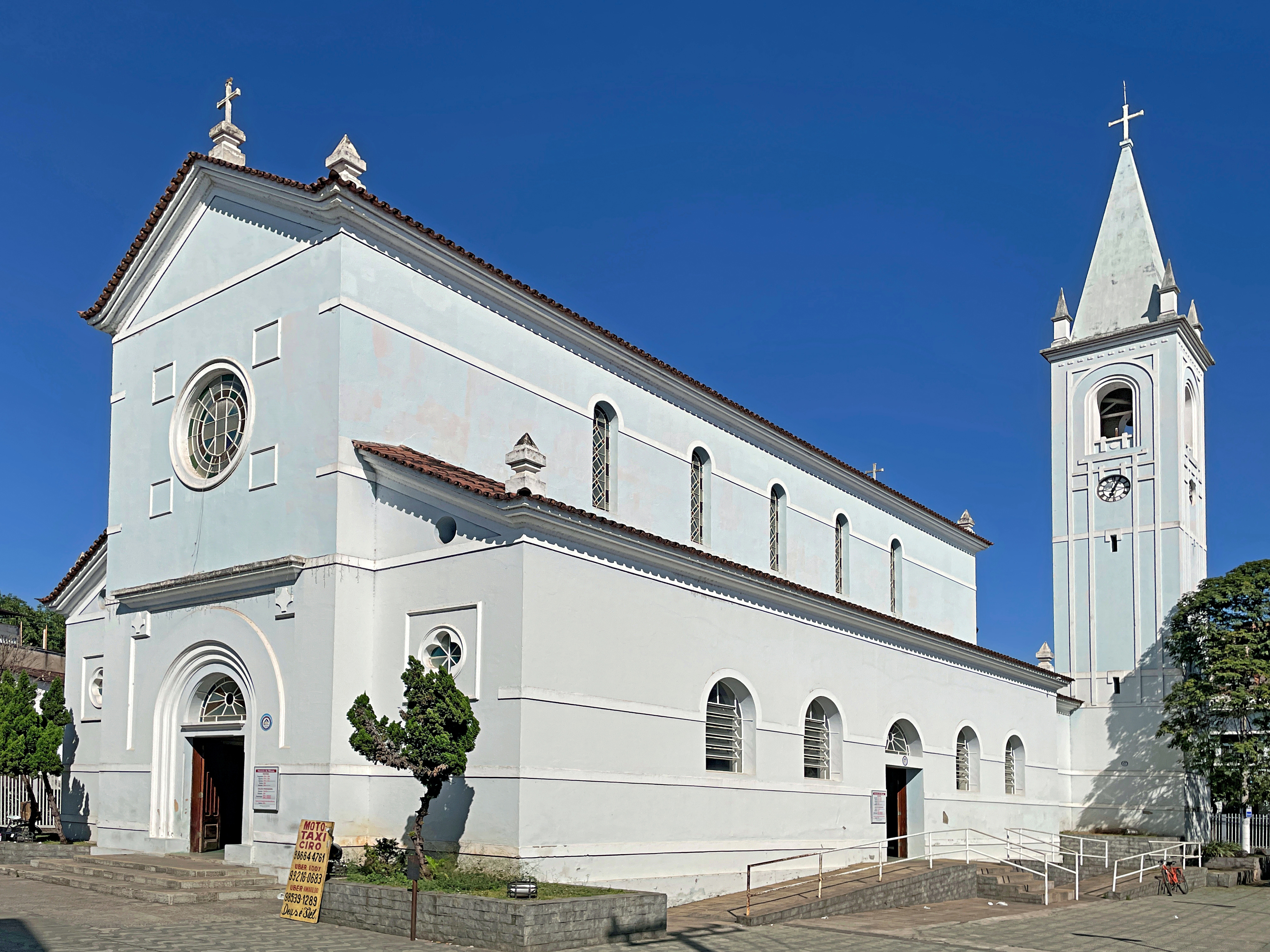
Main entrance to the Parish Church of Saint Sebastian, in downtown Fabriciano.

The territory of the Saint Sebastian Parish houses the Saint Sebastian Cathedral, which represents the title of co-cathedral of the Diocese of Itabira-Fabriciano held by Coronel Fabriciano, next to the Our Lady of the Rosary Cathedral, which is part of the Our Lady of the Rosary Parish in Itabira. In May 2021, after the emancipation of Our Lady of Fatima Parish, the division involved a total of ten communities, listed below.

Geographically, they correspond to the central and Mangueiras neighborhoods.

- Bom Jesus - Bom Jesus neighborhood
- Our Lady of the Immaculate Conception - Mangueiras neighborhood
- Our Lady of Penha - Manoel Domingos neighborhood
- Our Lady of Mount Carmel - Nossa Senhora do Carmo neighborhood
- Saint Teresa Verzeri - Nova Tijuca neighborhood
- Saint Therese of the Child Jesus and the Holy Face - Santa Terezinha neighborhood
- St. Alphonsus - Santa Terezinha II neighborhood
- Saint Francis of Assisi - Ponte Nova neighborhood
- Saint Sebastian (co-cathedral) - Centro neighborhood (Downtown Coronel Fabriciano)
- Saint Sebastian (Parish Church) - Centro neighborhood (Downtown Coronel Fabriciano)
Church of Our Lady of Mount Carmel, Nossa Senhora do Carmo neighborhood

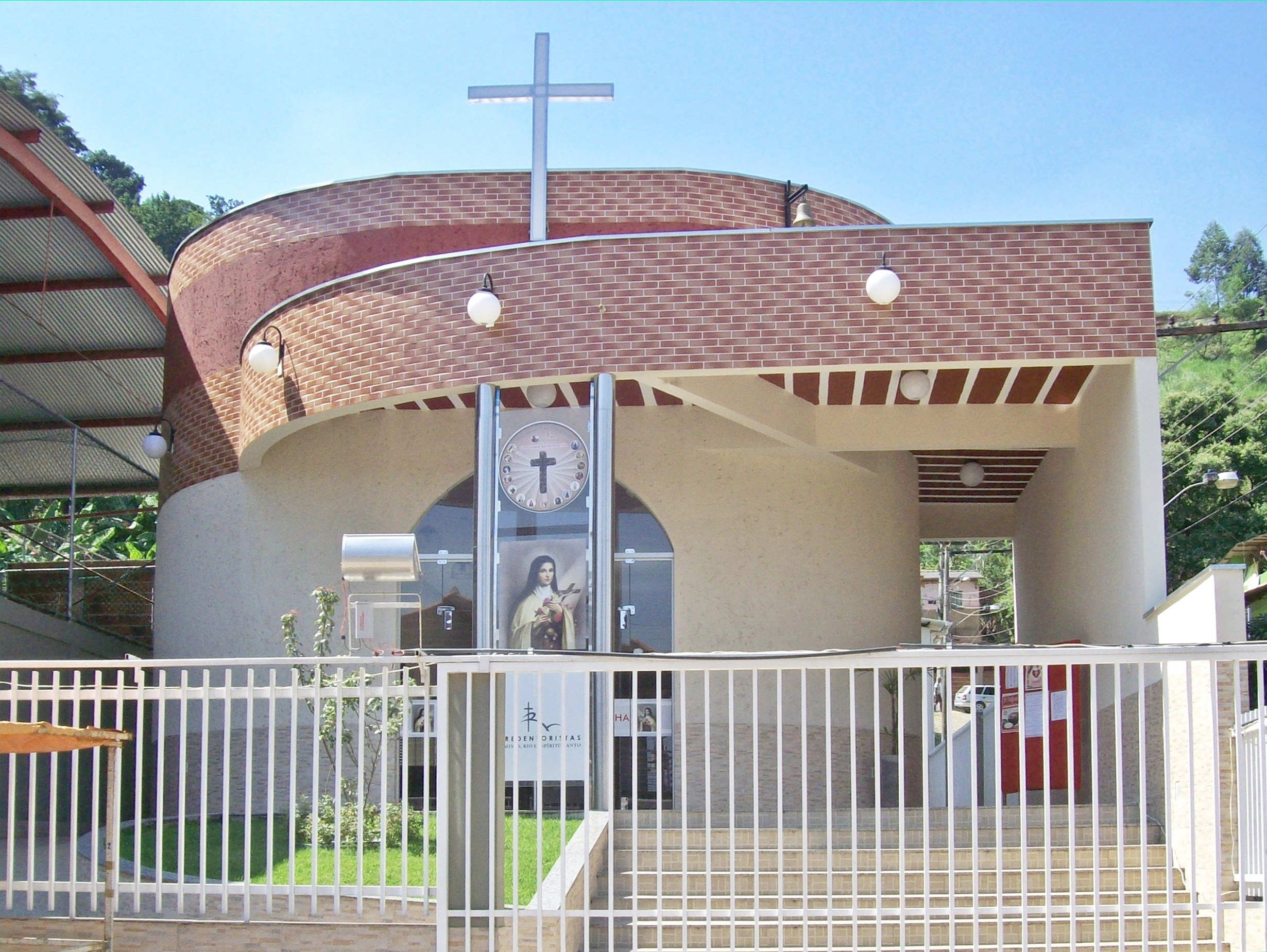
Church of Saint Theresa, Santa Terezinha neighborhood

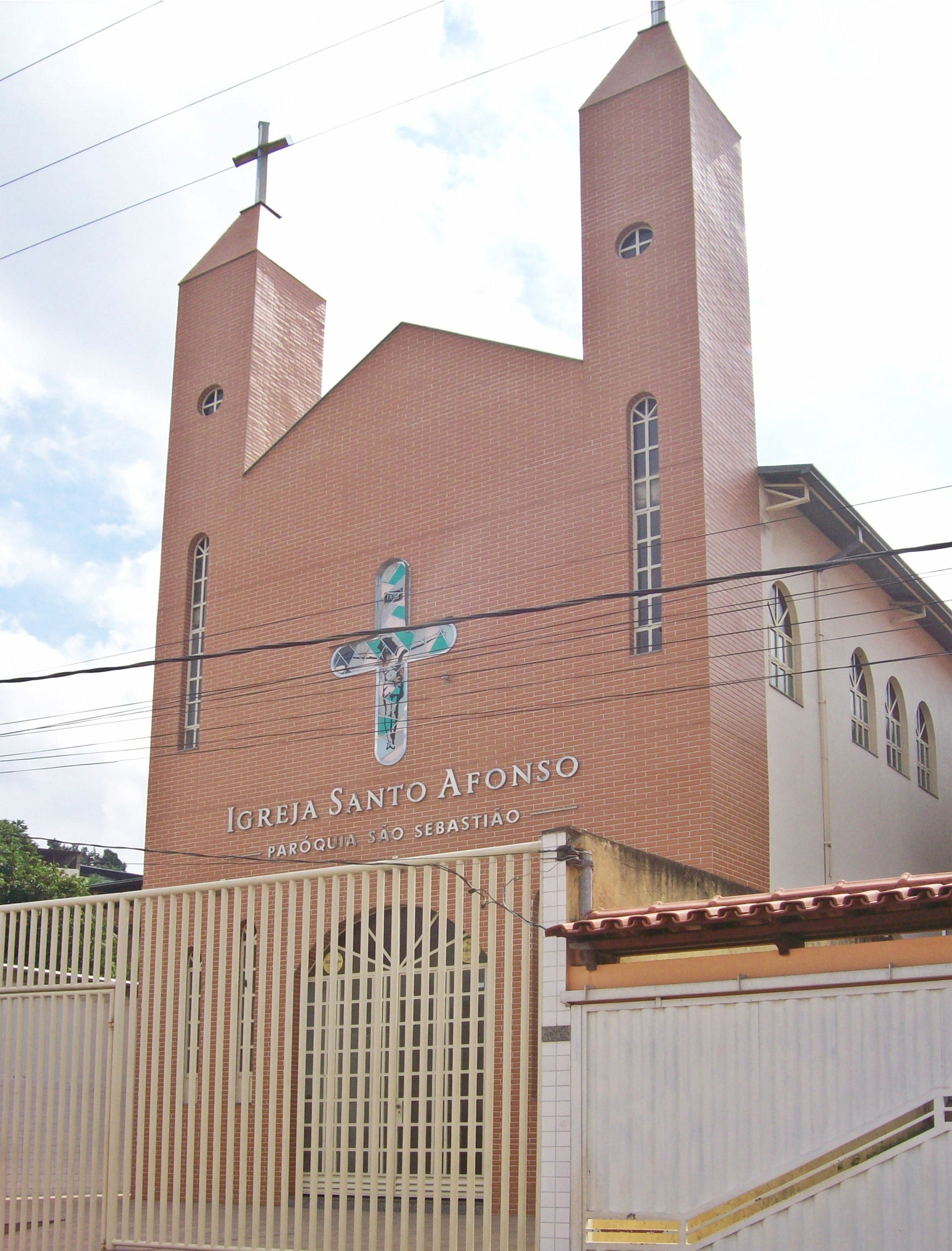
Church of St. Alphonsus, Santa Terezinha II neighborhood

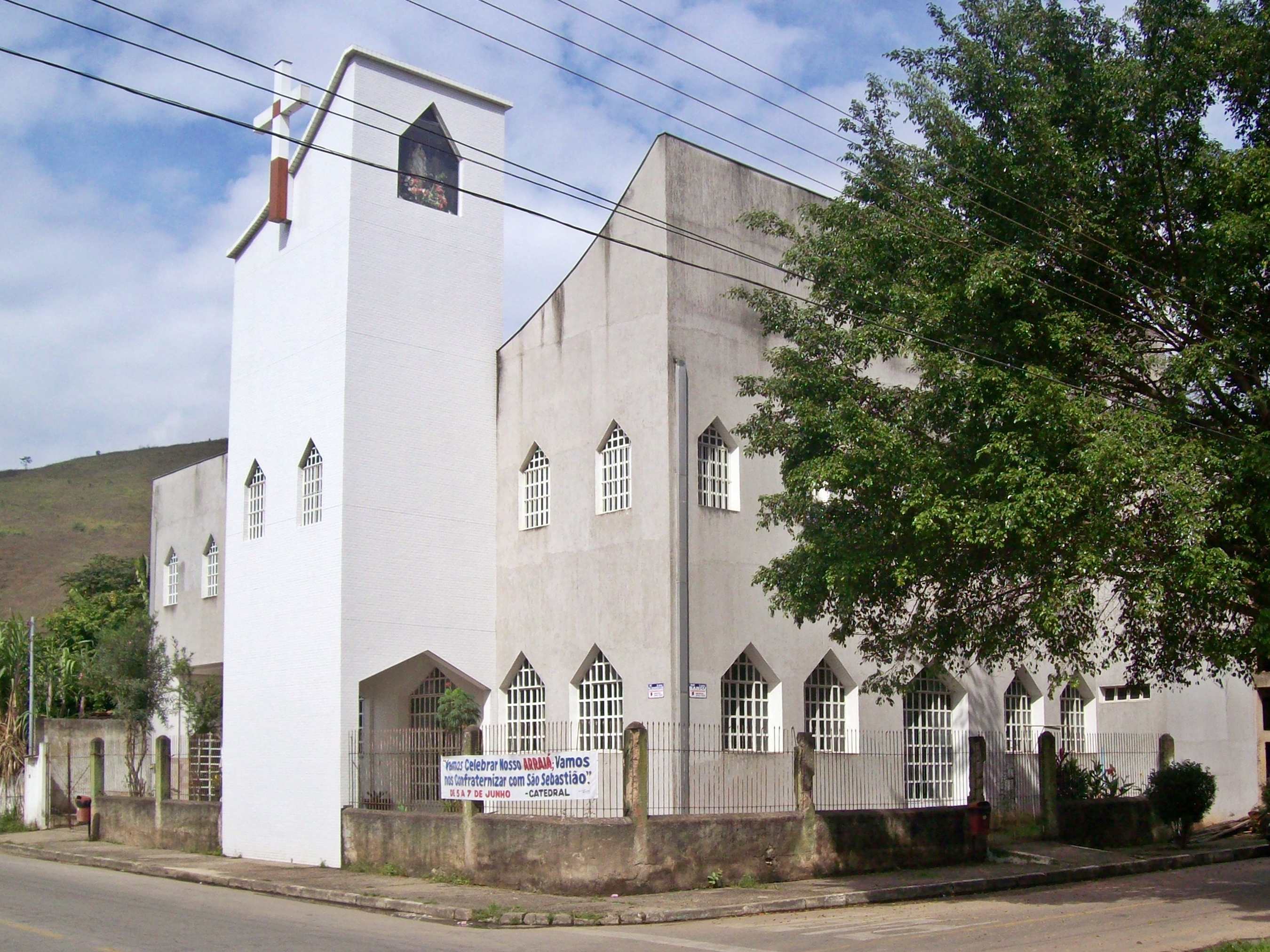
Church of Our Lady of the Immaculate Conception, Mangueiras neighborhood

== Administration and social activities ==
House of the Congregation of the Most Holy Redeemer in Coronel Fabriciano.

The Saint Sebastian Parish is administered by the Congregation of the Most Holy Redeemer, a male religious order founded by Saint Alphonsus in 1732 and established in Coronel Fabriciano on August 7, 1948. The Parish Administrative and Works Councils, the Pastoral of the Communities, and the Parish Pastoral maintain internal articulation in their fields. The Redemptorist Missionaries' Residence in Coronel Fabriciano, inaugurated in 1966, represents the headquarters of the parish and serves as a residence for the priests and seminarians of the Congregation who take on helping positions in the parish after finishing the philosophy course for a year in a kind of adaptation to ecclesiastical office and contact with the public before being sent to the novitiate. It also houses a library and an archive with all the registry books for baptisms, marriages, deaths, and local minutes.

Every day, a priest provides spiritual care to the faithful in the Parish House, after Mass in the Parish Church in the early hours of the morning. Another priest is available for external services, such as anointing the sick, while the others concentrate on services and visits in the communities. Most of the community services are associated with the activities of the social ministries, aided by the diocese, such as the presence of the Society of Saint Vincent de Paul, Pastoral Care of the Child, Pastoral Care of Minors, Pastoral Care of Health, Catechesis, Reflection Groups, Pastoral Care of Youth, and Pastoral of Baptism, each one aiming to act in their respective areas in integration with the communities. Educadora radio, the first radio station in the Vale do Aço, is maintained by the Redemptorists through the Saint Alphonsus Foundation.

== Culture ==
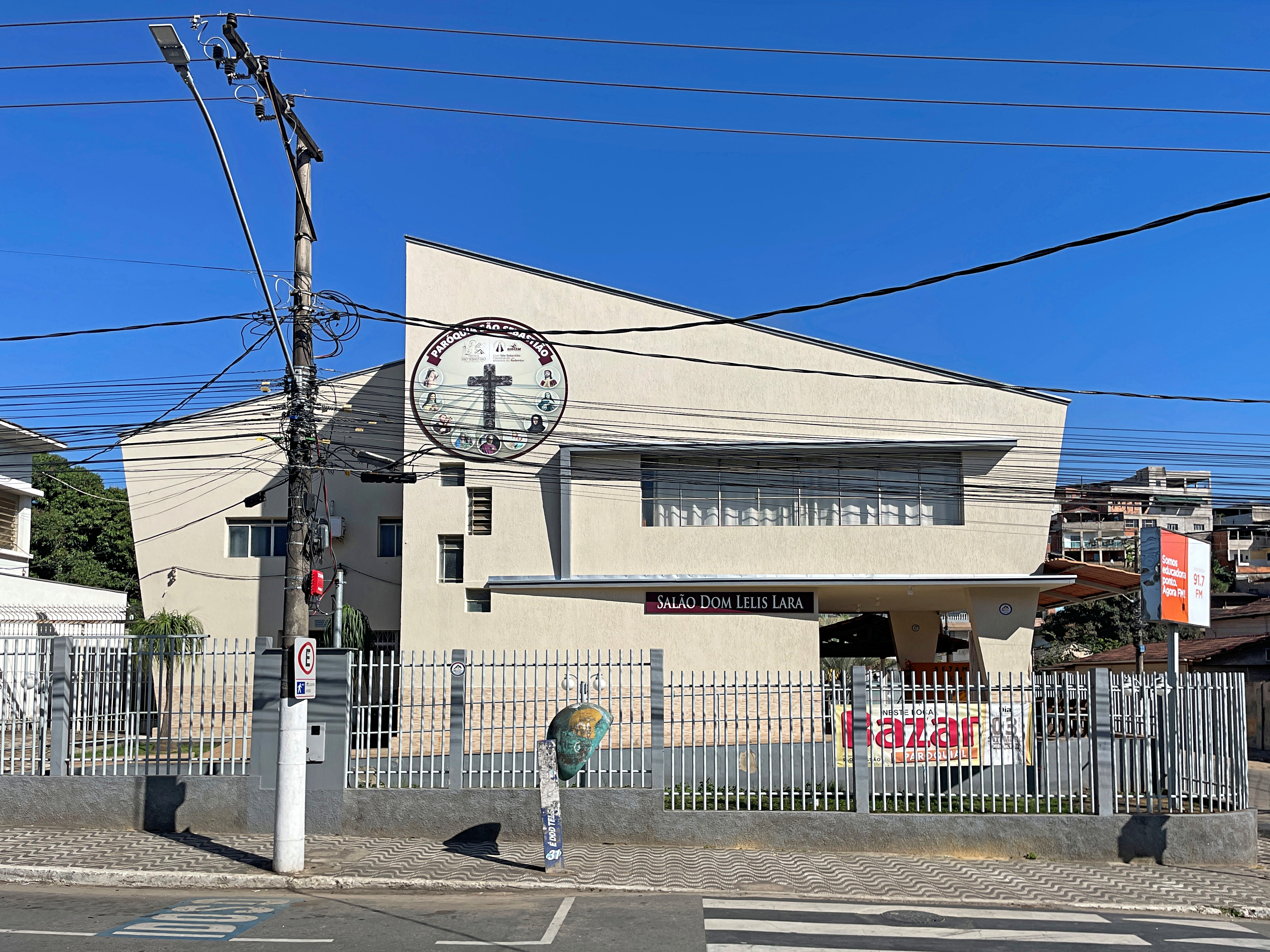
Dom Lélis Lara Parish Hall, stage for activities and events.

The parish is responsible for the maintenance of religious traditions that are configured as the main events and cultural manifestations of the city. Among them are the Feast of Saint Sebastian, patron saint of the city, together with the city's anniversary in January; Holy Week, when processions and staging are organized, keeping rituals, garments and costumes from the 1940s; Corpus Christi, with colored sawdust carpets made on the streets of the neighborhoods Santa Helena and Professores, whose origins also date back to the 1940s; and the celebrations of the parish anniversary together with Family Week in August, with special masses and cultural presentations. The June parties are also present in the communities, such as the Arraiá do Bastião, which takes place near the cathedral, with quadrilha presentations and the sale and consumption of typical foods in stalls. During the Christmas period, special activities are also held.

Both the Saint Sebastian Cathedral and the Parish Church are the main landmarks of the town. The Dom Lélis Lara Parish Hall (formerly the São José Parish Hall), inaugurated in 1959 and located next to the Redemptorists' Residence, houses pastoral and social activities of the parish, and was used as an annex to the Professor Pedro Calmon State School, the Court of Justice during renovations in the Forum (1978), and as the provisional seat of the City Council (1989). The project was designed by Wilmar Krantz, from Timóteo, and the works were managed by the merchant João Sotero Bragança under the supervision of the parish priest at the time, Joaquim Silveira. It is worth mentioning that most of the religious buildings in the communities, such as the Cathedral and the Parish Hall, were funded by donations from the faithful themselves and by holding auctions, raffles, musical shows, and trading in stalls. In the 90's, the parish's remaining assets, such as the Parish Church, the Parish Hall and the Feast of Corpus Christi, were declared part of Coronel Fabriciano's cultural heritage.

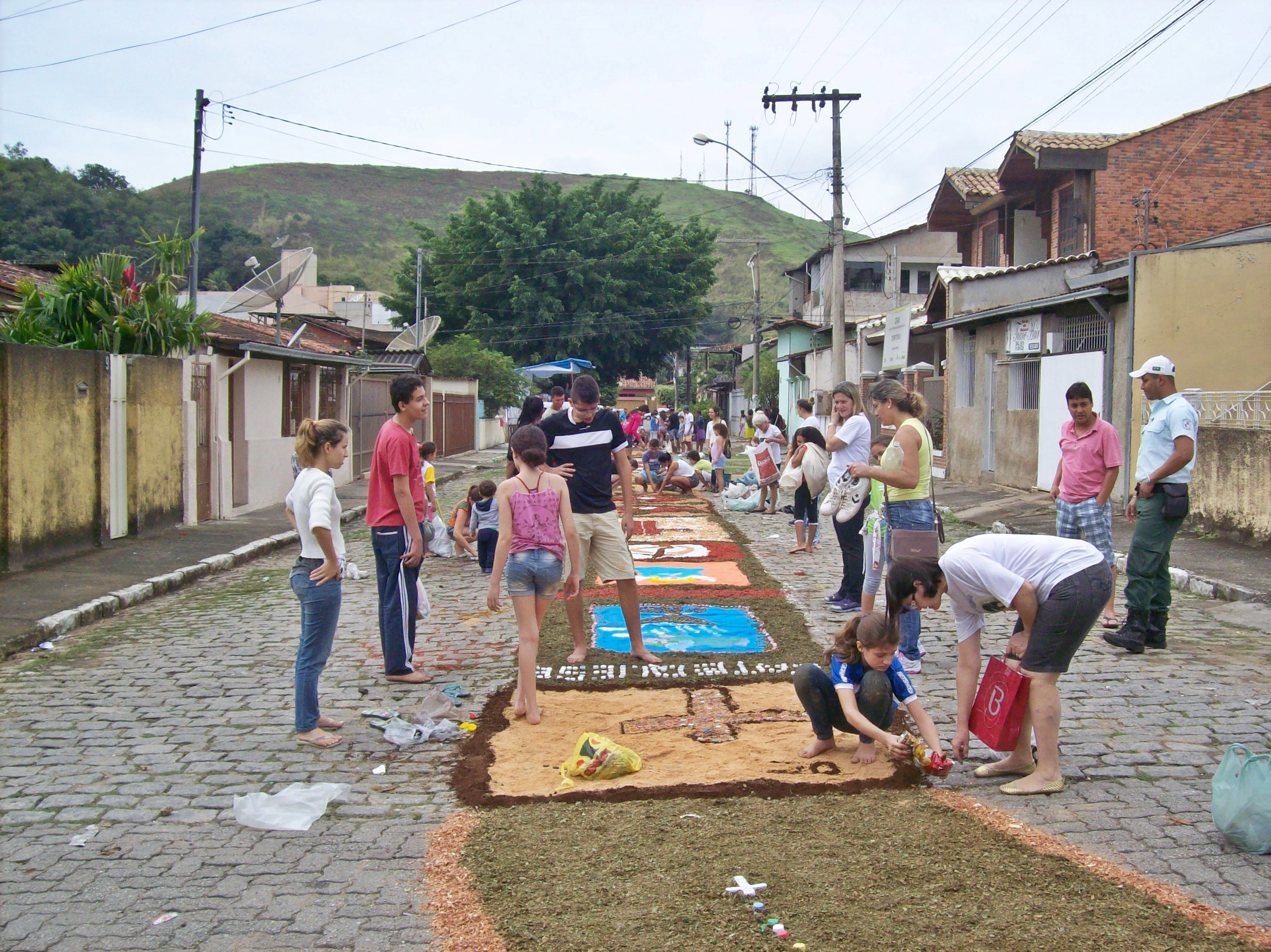
Montage of the Corpus Christi carpet of the Saint Sebastian Parish in the Professores neighborhood.

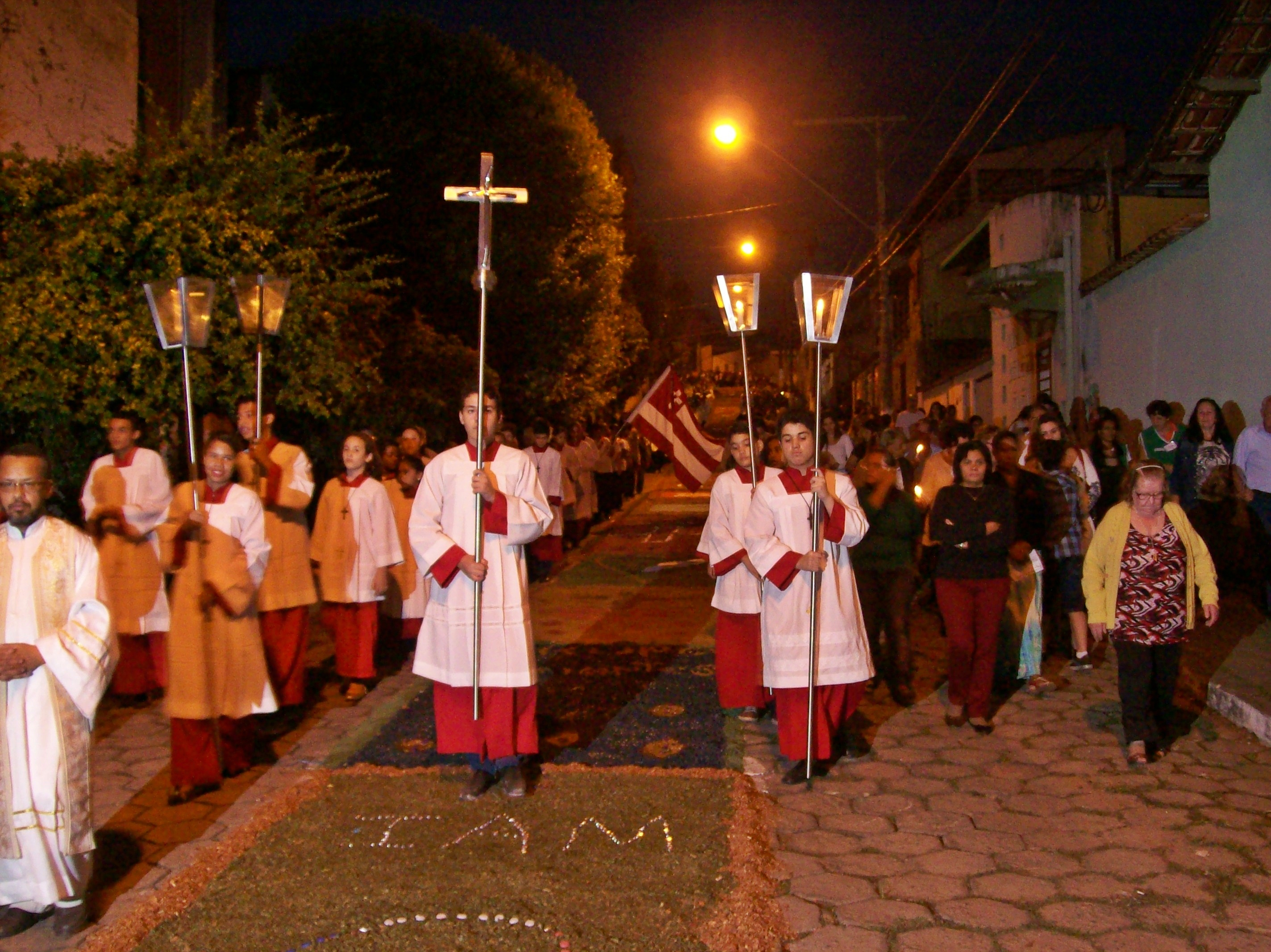
Corpus Christi procession of the Saint Sebastian Parish in the Professores neighborhood.

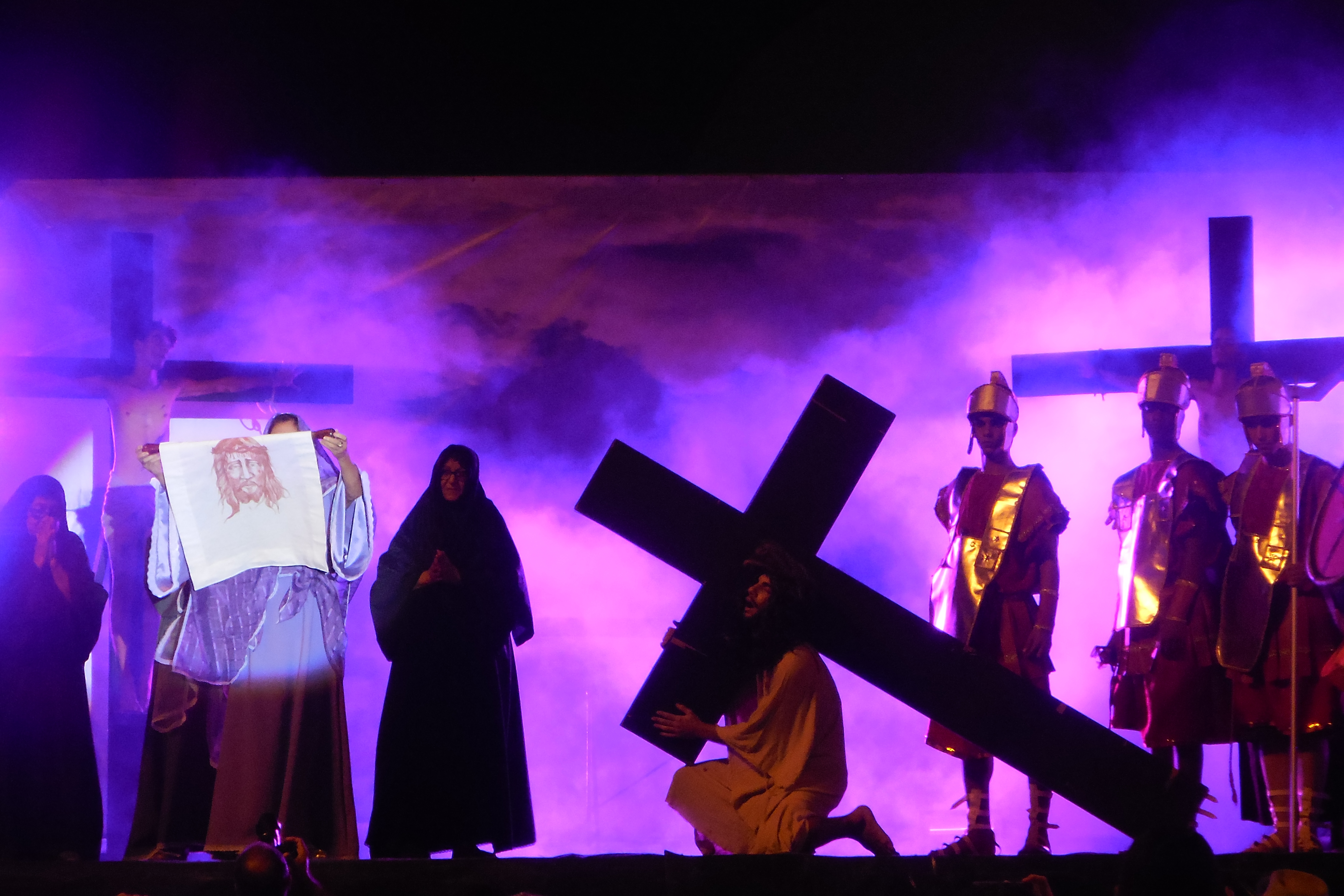
Saint Sebastian Parish's Passion of the Christ Theater at the Praça da Estação (English: Station Square).

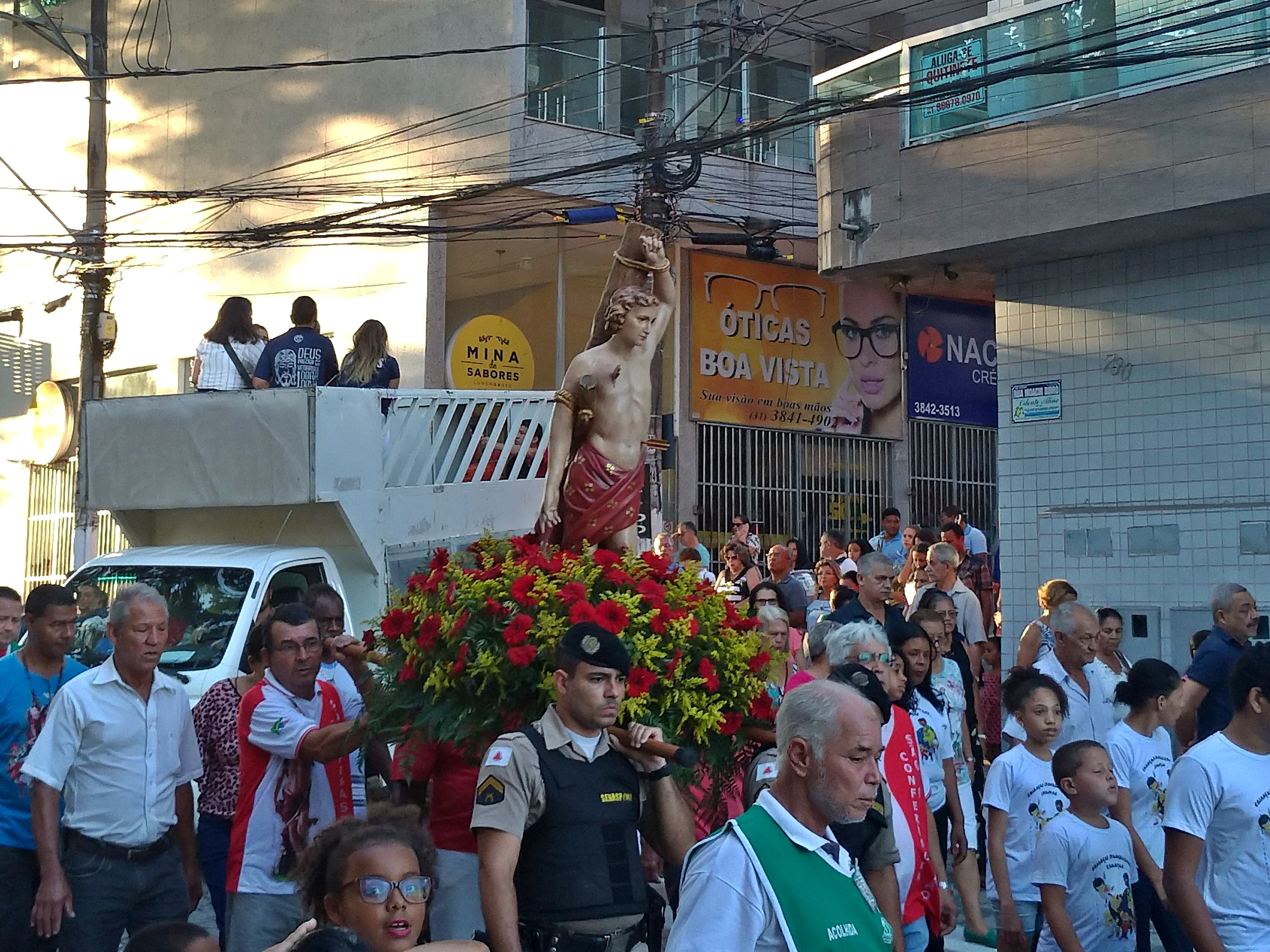
Image of Saint Sebastian from the Parish Church during patron saint's day procession.

== See also ==
- Diocese of Itabira-Fabriciano
- Saint Sebastian Cathedral
- Saint Sebastian Parish Church
