= Santo Antônio do Rio Abaixo =

Human settlement in Brazil

- Municipality
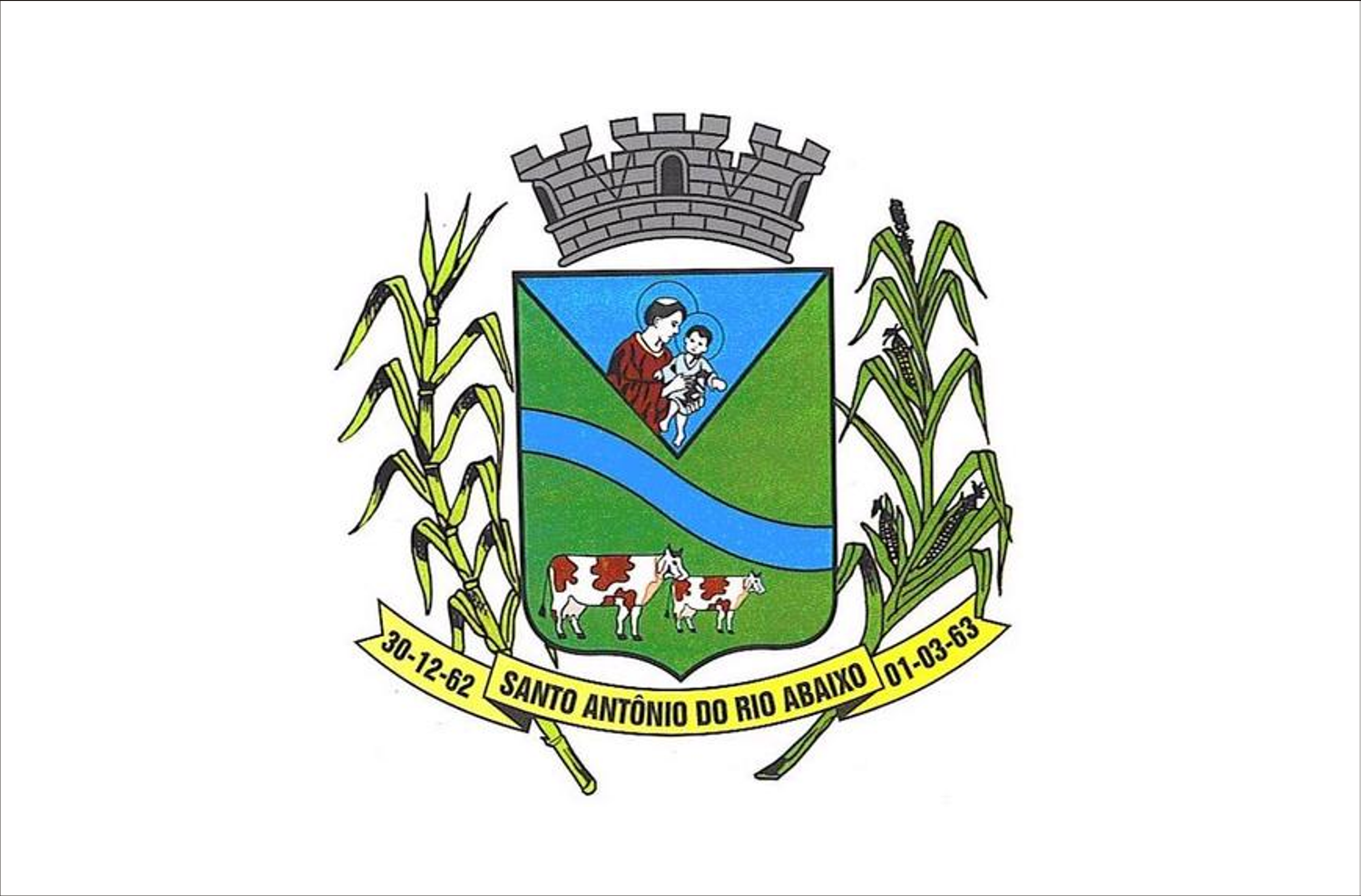
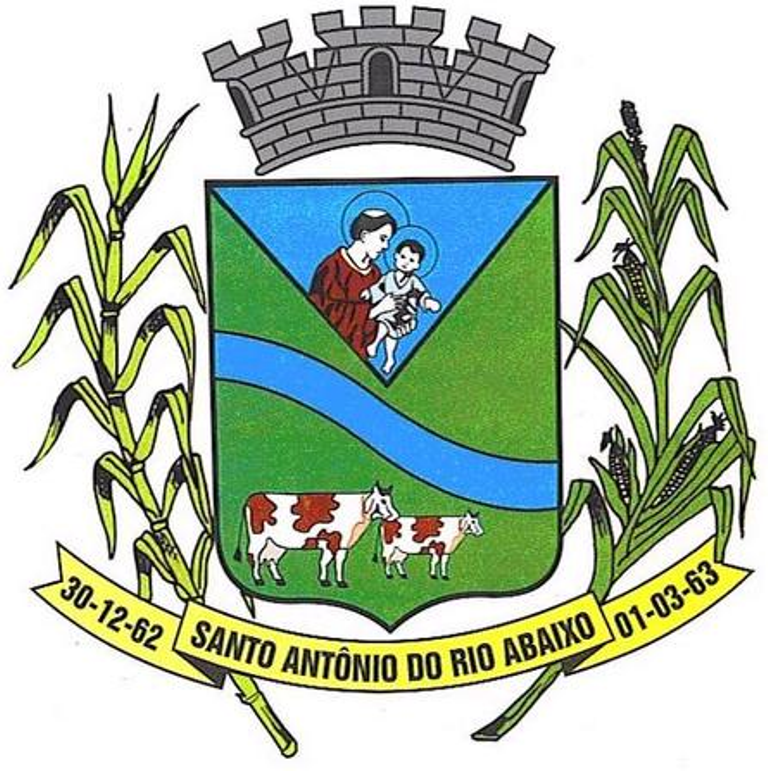
- Flag Coat of arms
- Interactive map of Santo Antônio do Rio Abaixo
- Country: Brazil
- State: Minas Gerais
- Region: Southeast

Population (2022 Census)
  - Total: 1,808
  - Estimate (2025): 1,856
- Time zone: UTC−3 (BRT)

Location of Santo Antônio do Rio Abaixo within Minas Gerais

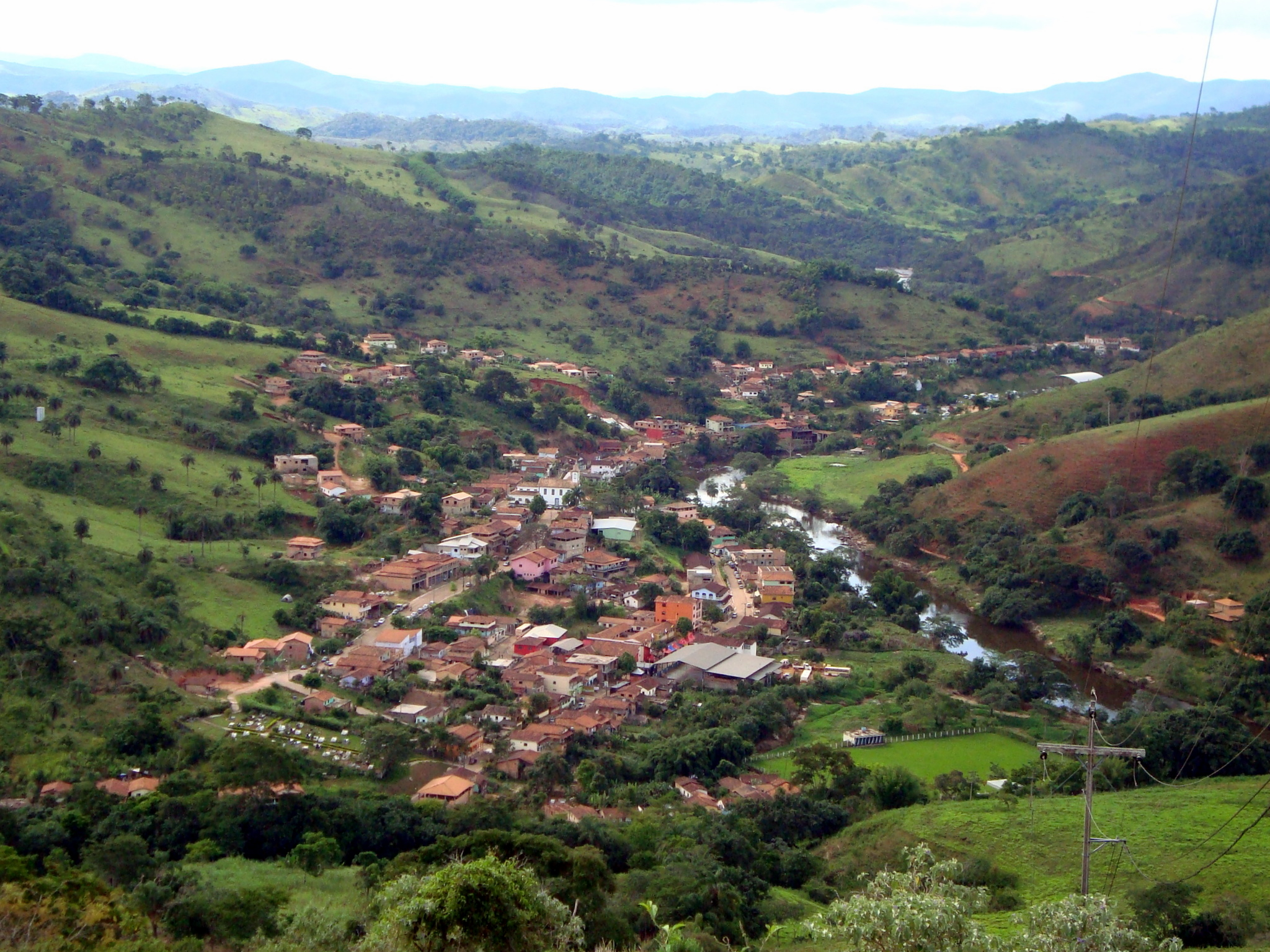
Partial view of Santo Antônio do Rio Abaixo

Santo Antônio do Rio Abaixo is a Brazilian municipality located in the state of Minas Gerais. The city belongs to the mesoregion of Belo Horizonte and to the microregion of Conceição do Mato Dentro. The estimated population in 2025 was 1,856 inhabitants.

== History ==
Santo Antônio do Rio Abaixo came about with its clusters of houses occupying a space between the rough edges of an auriferous river and the slopes of small hills. The expedition that founded Santo Antônio do Rio Abaixo consisted of families of Portuguese explorers Duarte and Alvarenga. The pioneers started mining gold in the lands of the Morro Grande Farm, building, on the right bank of a river, a chapel to St. Anthony and also their huts, thus forming a small village. Because it was built following the currents of water, it was named Santo Antônio do Rio Abaixo. Later, it increased to a town and became a district of Conceição do Mato Dentro, on January 4, 1875. Emancipated on March 1, 1963.

=== Foundation ===
In 1695, the pioneer Borba Gato discovers gold in Sabara. Then, Borba Gato explores the Santo Antônio river in the city of Ferros, where fixed residence (town Borba Gato). With it, other explorers came and were found in abundance, alluvial gold in the Santo Antônio river, secure residences in its right edge, giving rise to the camp of Santo Antônio do Rio Abaixo. In the year 1787, with a population fixed the River St. Anthony, estimated upwards of 400 people, José Ferreira Santiago, asked Queen Maria I of Portugal permission to raise a chapel which would serve him and his neighbours. His request was accepted on March 10, 1788.

=== Emancipation ===
The creation of the Santo Antônio do Rio Abaixo occurred on December 30, 1962. The installation also occurred on March 1, 1963. On June 30, there were the first elections for mayor, deputy mayor and the aldermen of the City Council, being sworn in on September 3, 1963.

== Geography ==
Located in the Doce river ("Rio Doce) basin, Santo Antônio do Rio Abaixo is 190 km from Belo Horizonte, by the MG-010, BR-381 and BR-120. Situated between the hills and mountains, it is a typical small town in Minas Gerais, although since the 1980s it has lost much of its older architecture. The latest architectural losses were the mill at the entrance of the city and parish house, colonial-style house, which, beside the church, was certainly the oldest house in town. Currently, the oldest buildings are restricted to the mansions of the farms around the city.

The highest point near the urban area is the Mount Cristal, with 897m of altitude. The Santo Antônio river is the main river of the city and its waters with rapids are the major attraction of the city. The wastewater produced by the city still is not treated and is discharged raw in Santo Antônio River.

Within the limits of the municipality, there is the Peixe River, which cascades and waterfalls attract many tourists every year.

== Administration ==
- Mayor: Marluce Oliveira Duarte
- Vice-mayor: Jairo Duarte Azevedo
- Speaker of the house: Antônio Andrade de Oliveira

=== Quarters ===
- Quarter Centro (Beira d'água)
- Quarter Boa Vista
- Quarter Cidade Nova

=== Public parks ===
Avenues

- Avenue Manuel Oliveira Santos
- Avenue Valdir Alvarenga Quintão

Squares

- Square Alcino Quintão
- Square Joaquim Coelho de Sousa

Streets

- Street Nelson Edson Porto
- Street Horácio Bittencourt
- Street Major Quintão
- Street Silvestre da Costa Lage
- Street Mestra Josefina Augusta dos Santos
- Street Joaquim Duarte Neto
- Street Joaquim Pereira Chaves
- Street João Paulo de Andrade
- Street Damaso de Azevedo
- Street José Camilo Rodrigues
- Street Antônio de Oliveira Quintão
- Street Dácio de Oliveira Quintão
- Street Bento Oliveira de Araújo
- Street José de Sousa Gomes

== Tourism ==
Santo Antônio do Rio Abaixo has many tourist attractions:

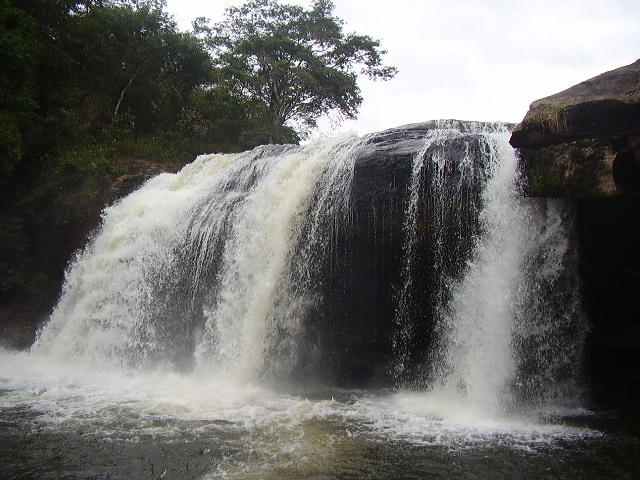
Chuvisco falls

=== Waterfalls ===
- Cristal Falls
- Chuvisco Falls
- Bahia Falls
- Angico Falls
- Martins Leite Falls
- Limão Falls
- Ribeirão Falls
- Domingo Falls

=== Fluvial beaches ===
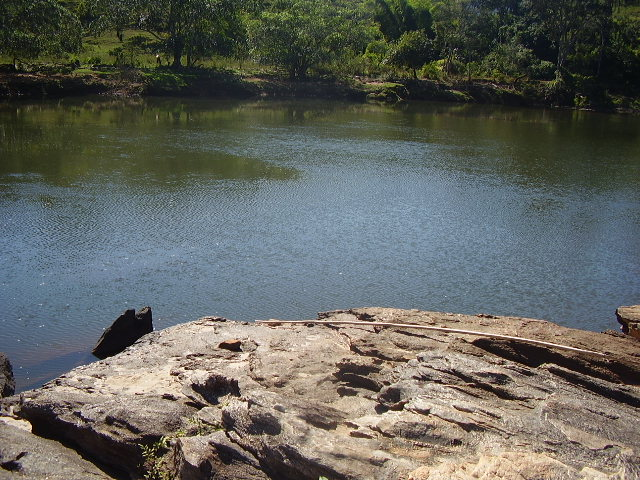
Limão pool

- Benedito Martins Leite Balneal
- Tabuleiro beach
- Vieiras beach

=== Natural pools ===
- Limão Pool
- Domingo Pool

=== Farms ===
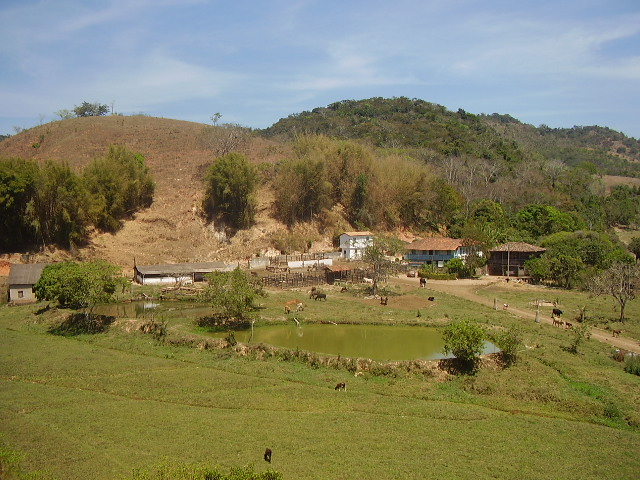
Barra dos Menezes Farm

- Barra dos Menezes Farm
- Bambus Farm
- Maracujá Farm
- Morro Grande Farm
- Engenho Farm
- Pintas Farm
- Chapada Farm
- Fonseca Farm
- Engenho Velho Farm
- São Geraldo Farm
- Claras Farm

Sites

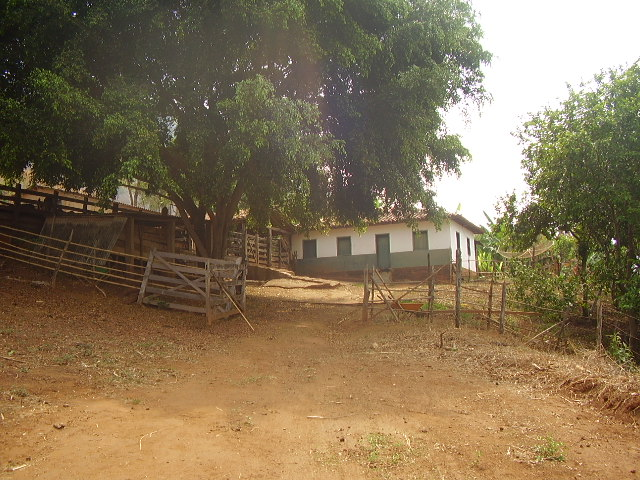
Córrego das Chaves site

- Córrego das Lages site
- Bahia site
- Córrego das Chaves site
- Paraguay site
- Morro Grande site
- Barra dos Menezes site
- Quilombo site

== See also ==
- List of municipalities in Minas Gerais

== External linkings ==
- Official page
- Page of the City Hall
