= São Sebastião do Rio Preto =

Municipality in Minas Gerais, Brazil

Coordinates: 19°17′31″S 43°10′26″W

- Municipality
- Interactive map of São Sebastião do Rio Preto
- Country: Brazil
- State: Minas Gerais
- Region: Southeast

Population (2022 Census)
  - Total: 1,259
  - Estimate (2025): 1,229
- Time zone: UTC−3 (BRT)

Location of São Sebastião do Rio Preto within Minas Gerais

São Sebastião do Rio Preto is a Brazilian municipality located in the state of Minas Gerais. The city belongs to the mesoregion Metropolitana de Belo Horizonte and to the microregion of Conceição do Mato Dentro. As of 2025, the estimated population was 1,229.

== See also ==
- List of municipalities in Minas Gerais
