= Juscelino Kubitschek (disambiguation) =

Juscelino Kubitschek was the President of Brazil between 1956 and 1961. Many places were named after him, including:

== Populated places ==
- Presidente Juscelino, a municipality in Minas Gerais, Brazil
- Presidente Kubitschek, a municipality in Minas Gerais, Brazil
- Presidente Juscelino, Maranhão, a municipality in Maranhão, Brazil
- Serra Caiada, known until 2012 as Presidente Juscelino, a municipality in Rio Grande do Norte, Brazil
- Júlia Kubitschek (Coronel Fabriciano), a neighbourhood of Coronel Fabriciano, Minas Gerais, Brazil, named after Júlia Kubitschek, the President's mother
- Juscelino Kubitschek, Santa Maria, a neighbourhood in Santa Maria, Rio Grande do Sul, Brazil

== Transport ==
- Presidente Juscelino Kubitschek International Airport, Brasília, Federal District, Brazil
- Juscelino Kubitschek Airport, Diamantina, Minas Gerais, Brazil
- Juscelino Kubitschek bridge (Ponte Juscelino Kubitschek), Brasília, Federal District, Brazil
  - Estrada Parque Juscelino Kubitschek (DF-027), a street in Brasília, Federal District, Brazil
- Juscelino Kubitschek de Oliveira bridge (built 1960), between Estreito, Maranhão and Aguiarnópolis, Tocantins
  - Juscelino Kubitschek de Oliveira Bridge collapse, the 2024 collapse of this bridge
- BR-040, named President Juscelino Kubitschek Highway in 2009, a federal highway of Brazil connecting Brasília to Rio de Janeiro
- President Juscelino Kubitschek Avenue, arterial road in the city of São Paulo, Brazil
- Juscelino Kubitschek Avenue (Palmas), major thoroughfare in Palmas, Tocatins, Brazil

== Buildings ==
- Kubitschek Plaza, 5-star hotel, Brasília, Federal District, Brazil
- Conjunto Governador Kubitschek, the tallest building in Belo Horizonte, Minas Gerais, Brazil
- Juscelino Kubitschek Power Plant, at the Irapé Dam in Mina Gerais, Brazil

=== Museums ===
- JK Memorial, mausoleum and museum in Brasília, Federal District, Brazil
- Kubitschek Residence Museum (est. 2013) in Belo Horizonte, Minas Gerais, Brazil

=== Stadiums ===
- Estádio JK Paranoá a.k.a. Estádio Juscelino Kubitschek Paranoá, Federal District, Brazil
- Estádio JK a.k.a. Estádio Municipal Juscelino Kubitschek, Itumbiara, Goiás, Brazil
- Estádio Municipal Juscelino Kubitschek (Andradas), Andradas, Minas Gerais, Brazil
- Estádio Juscelino Kubitschek de Oliveira (1923-1986), former stadium in Belo Horizonte, Minas Gerais, Brazil
- Juscelino Kubitschek Arena, indoor stadium in Belo Horizonte, Minas Gerais, Brazil
- Estádio Juscelino Kubitschek (Manhuaçu) (est. 1976) in Manhuaçu, Minas Gerais, Brazil

=== Educational institutions ===
- Júlia Kubitschek School (est. 1957), the first primary school established in Brasília, Federal District, Brazil, named after teacher Júlia Kubitschek, the President's mother
- Instituto de Educação Sarah Kubitschek (est. 1957) in Rio de Janeiro, Brazil, named after First Lady Sarah Kubitschek
- ETE Juscelino Kubitschek a.k.a. Escola Técnica Estadual Juscelino Kubitschek (est. 1979), a state technical college in Rio de Janeiro, Brazil

=== Hospitals ===
- Hospital Juscelino Kubitschek de Oliveira (1957-1974), a former hospital in Brasília, Federal District, Brazil
- Hospital Sarah Kubitschek a.k.a. Rede Sarah (est. 1960), a network of hospitals in Brazil, named after First Lady Sarah Kubitschek

== Parks ==
- Sarah Kubitschek City Park, urban park in Brasília, Federal District, Brazil, named after First Lady Sarah Kubitschek
- Juscelino Kubitschek Park, urban park in Belo Horizonte, Minas Gerais, Brazil

== See also ==
- Kubitschek (disambiguation)
