= Kubitschek =

Kubitschek is a Germanized form of the Czech surname Kubíček. Notable people with the surname include:

- Juscelino Kubitschek (1902–1976), President of Brazil from 1956–1961
  - Júlia Kubitschek (1873–1971), Brazilian teacher, mother of President Juscelino Kubitschek
  - Sarah Kubitschek (1909–1996), Brazilian politician, wife of President Juscelino Kubitschek
  - Maria Estela Kubitschek (born 1942), Brazilian politician, daughter of President Juscelino Kubitschek
  - Márcia Kubitschek (1943–2000), Brazilian politician, daughter of President Juscelino Kubitschek
- Wilhelm Kubitschek (1858–1936), Austrian art historian and archaeologist
- Rudolf Kubitschek (1895–1945), writer and folklorist from Bohemia
- Grete Kubitschek (1903–?), Austrian Olympic figure skater
- Ruth Maria Kubitschek (1931–2024), Czech-born German actress
- Maria Kubitschek (born 1962), Austrian politician
- Götz Kubitschek (born 1970), German far-right publisher and activist, husband of Ellen Kositza Kubitschek
- Ellen Kositza, married name Schenke then Kubitschek (born 1978), German journalist and columnist, wife of Götz Kubitschek

== See also ==
- Juscelino Kubitschek (disambiguation), for the many places named after President of Brazil Juscelino Kubitschek
- Kubicek (disambiguation)
- Kuybyshev (disambiguation)
- Kubizek, a surname
- Kubicki, a surname
