= Eurovision Young Musicians 1982 =

International youth classical music contest

Date and venue
- Final: 11 May 1982
- Venue: Free Trade Hall; Manchester, United Kingdom

Organisation
- Organiser: European Broadcasting Union (EBU)
- Executive supervisor: Frank Naef

Production
- Host broadcaster: British Broadcasting Corporation (BBC)
- Director: Peter Butler
- Executive producer: Roy Tipping
- Musical director: Bryden Thomson
- Presenter: Humphrey Burton

Participants
- Number of entries: 6 (Note: Given the impossibility of transmitting nine stage performances due to time problems, the Nordic broadcasters (those from Denmark, Norway, Finland, and Sweden) sent a joint participant this year from Norway. In the competition, the musician represented the Norwegian colors.)
- Debuting countries: Austria; France; Germany; Norway; Switzerland; United Kingdom
- Participation map: Participating countries

Vote
- Voting system: Jury chose their top 3 favourites by vote.
- Winning musician: Germany; Markus Pawlik

Eurovision Young Musicians 1982 was the first edition of Eurovision Young Musicians, held on 11 May 1982 at the Free Trade Hall in Manchester, United Kingdom, and presented by Humphrey Burton. It was organised by the European Broadcasting Union (EBU) and host broadcaster the British Broadcasting Corporation (BBC). The BBC Northern Symphony Orchestra conducted by Bryden Thomson accompanied all competing performers.

Six musicians representing nine countries took part in début contest, which was televised across the Eurovision Network. Musicians, who could not be older than 19 years of age, played an instrumental and a musical piece of their choice. The entry from Norway jointly represented Denmark, Norway, Finland, and Sweden.

The winner was pianist Markus Pawlik representing Germany, with clarinetist Paul Meyer representing France placing second, and pianist Bertrand Roulet representing Switzerland placing third. The winner received a cash prize of £1,000. It was also notable that Germany won the Eurovision Song Contest 1982 just a few weeks earlier also in England, and also by performing last in the running order.

== History ==
Eurovision Young Musicians, inspired by the success of the BBC Young Musician of the Year competition, is a biennial competition organised by the European Broadcasting Union (EBU) for European musicians that are 18 years old or younger. Some participating countries held national heats in order to select their representatives for the contest. The first edition of Eurovision Young Musicians took place in Manchester, United Kingdom on 11 May 1982 and six countries took part.

The BBC Young Musician of the Year is a televised national music competition. Broadcast originally on BBC Two biennially, and then on BBC Four years later. Despite the name, and hosted by the British Broadcasting Corporation (BBC), the competition, a former member of European Union of Music Competitions for Youth, is designed for British percussion, keyboard, string, brass and woodwind players, all of whom must be eighteen years of age or under on 1 January in the relevant year.

The competition was established in 1978 by Humphrey Burton and Walter Todds, both of whom are former members of the BBC Television Music Department. Michael Hext, a trombonist, was the inaugural winner. In 1994, the usage of percussion instruments was first permitted, alongside the existing keyboard, string, brass and woodwind categories. The competition has five stages, which consist of regional auditions, category auditions, category finals, semi-finals and the final.

== Location ==
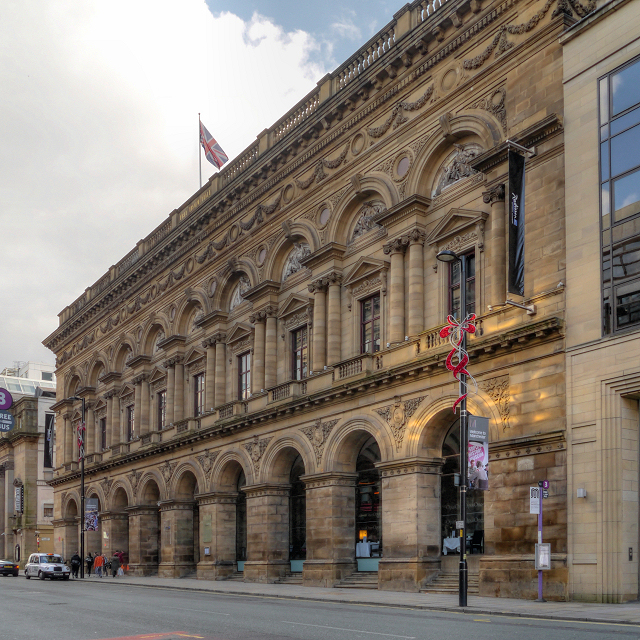
The façade of the Free Trade Hall

The Free Trade Hall in Peter Street, Manchester, England, was the host venue for the first edition of Eurovision Young Musicians. The Italian palazzo-style hall was built on a trapeziform site in ashlar sandstone. It has a two-storey, nine-bay facade and concealed roof. On Peter Street, its ground floor arcade has rectangular piers with round-headed arches and spandrels bearing the coats of arms of Lancashire towns that took part in the Anti-Corn Law movement. The upper floor has a colonnaded arcade, its tympana frieze is richly decorated with carved figures representing free trade, the arts, commerce, manufacture and the continents. Above the tympanum is a prominent cornice with balustraded parapet. The upper floor has paired Ionic columns to each bay and a tall window with a pedimented architrave behind a balustraded balcony. The return sides have three bays in a matching but simpler style of blank arches. The rear wall was rebuilt in 1950–51 with pilasters surmounted by relief figures representing the entertainment which took place in the old hall. The Large Hall was in a classical style with a coffered ceiling, the walls had wood panelling in oak, walnut and sycamore. Pevsner described it as "the noblest monument in the Cinquecento style in England", whilst Hartwell considered it "a classic which belongs in the canon of historic English architecture."

== Format ==
Humphrey Burton was the host of the inaugural contest, and welcomed representatives from six participating countries in English, French, and German. Each participating country were able to send male or female artists who were no older than 19 years of age, to represent them by playing an instrumental and a musical piece of their choice. They were all accompanied by the BBC Northern Symphony Orchestra, which was conducted by Bryden Thomson. The winner received a cash prize of £1,000.

== Participants and results ==
Awards were given to the top three countries. The table below highlights these using gold, silver, and bronze. The placing results of the remaining participants is unknown and never made public by the European Broadcasting Union.

Participants and results
| R/O | Country | Broadcaster | Performer(s) | Instrument | Piece(s) | Composer(s) | Pl. |
|---|---|---|---|---|---|---|---|
| 1 | United Kingdom | BBC | Anna Markland | Piano | Piano Concerto No.2 | Sergei Rachmaninoff | |
| 2 | France | TF1 | Paul Meyer | Clarinet | Clarinet Concerto No.2 | Carl Maria von Weber | 2 |
| 3 | Norway | DR; NRK; YLE; SVT | Atle Sponberg | Violin | Violin Concerto No.1 | Niccolò Paganini | |
| 4 | Switzerland | SRG SSR | Bertrand Roulet | Piano | Piano Concerto No.2 | Dmitri Shostakovich | 3 |
| 5 | Austria | ORF | Leonhard Kubizek | Clarinet | Clarinet Concerto | Wolfgang Amadeus Mozart | |
| 6 | Germany | ZDF | Markus Pawlik | Piano | Piano Concerto No.1 | Felix Mendelssohn | 1 |

== Jury members ==
The jury members consisted of the following:

- Argentina – Miguel Ángel Estrella
- Austria – Gerhard Wimberger
- France – Jean-Claude Casadesus
- Germany – Hans Heinz Stuckenschmidt
- Israel – Mischa Maisky
- Italy – Argeo Quadri (head juror)
- Netherlands – Frans Vester
- Norway – Gunnar Rugstad
- Switzerland – Eric Tappy
- United Kingdom – Alun Hoddinott
- United States – Carole Dawn Reinhart

== Broadcasting ==
EBU members from the following countries broadcast the contest. Known details on the broadcasts in each country, including the specific broadcasting stations and commentators are shown in the tables below.

Broadcasters in participating countries
| Country | Broadcaster | Channel(s) | Commentator(s) | Ref(s) |
|---|---|---|---|---|
| Austria | ORF | FS2 | Andrea Seebohm | |
| Denmark | DR | DR TV, DR P1, (Note: Deferred broadcast at 23:00 CEST (22:00 UTC).) DR P2 | Marianne Albrechtslund | |
| France | TF1 | | Serge Kaufmann | |
| Germany | ZDF | | | |
| Norway | NRK | NRK Fjernsynet | Eyvind Solås | |
| Switzerland | SRG SSR | TSR, RSR 2 | Georges Kleinmann | |
| United Kingdom | BBC | BBC2, BBC Radio 4 | Humphrey Burton and Margaret Percy | |

== See also ==
- Eurovision Song Contest 1982
