= Kuybyshevsky District =

Kuybyshevsky District may refer to:

- Kuybyshevsky District, Russia, name of several districts and city districts in Russia
- Kuibyshevskyi District, Donetsk, a city district of Donetsk, Ukraine
- Kuibysheve Raion or Kuibyshevskyi Raion, former name of Bilmak Raion in Zaporizhia Oblast, Ukraine
- Kuybyshevskiy District, former name of Jomi District in Khatlon, Tajikistan

== See also ==
- Kuybyshevsky (disambiguation)
- Kuybyshev (disambiguation)
