= Kubicki =

Kubicki (Polish pronunciation: [kuˈbit͡ski]; feminine: Kubicka; plural: Kubiccy) is a Polish locational surname, which originally meant a person from Kubice in Poland. Alternative spellings include Czech and Slovak Kubický, and a Germanized variant, Kubitzki.

Language	Masculine	Feminine
Polish	Kubicki	Kubicka
Czech, Slovak	Kubický	Kubická
Russian (Romanization)	Кубицкий (Kubitsky, Kubitskiy, Kubickij)	Кубицкая (Kubitskaya, Kubitskaia, Kubickaja)
Ukrainian (Romanization)	Кубицький (Kubytskyi, Kubytskyy, Kubyckyj); Кубіцький (Kubitskyi, Kubitskyy, Kubickyj)	Кубицька (Kubytska, Kubycka); Кубіцька; Kubitska, Kubicka

== People ==
- Adrian Kubicki (born 1987), Consul General of the Republic of Poland in New York City.
- Anna Kubicka (born 1999), Polish international chess master
- Dariusz Kubicki (born 1963), Polish footballer and manager
- Eugeniusz Kubicki (1925–1987), Polish footballer
- Ewa Kubicka, Polish mathematician
- Hanna Foltyn-Kubicka (born 1950), Polish Member of the European Parliament
- Jadwiga Kubicka, Polish activist and writer
- Jakub Kubicki (1758–1833), Polish architect and designer
- Janusz Kubicki (born 1969), Polish Mayor of Zielona Góra
- Jarosław Kubicki (born 1995), Polish footballer
- Jeremi Kubicki (1911–1938), Polish Olympic painter
- Kathrine Kubicki (born 1994), Danish handball player
- Klaus Kubitzki (1933–2022), German botanist and professor
- Micaela Schmidt-Kubicki (born 1970), German Olympic rower
- Patryk Kubicki (born 1993), Polish footballer and coach
- Philip Kubicki (born 1943), American businessman
- Stanisław Kubicki (1889–1942), Polish painter and printmaker
- Terry Kubicka (born 1956), American figure skater
- Werner Kubitzki (1915–1994), German Olympic field hockey player
- Wolfgang Kubicki (born 1952), German politician

== Other ==
- Kubicki Ikub I, Polish glider

== See also ==
- Kubicek (disambiguation)
- Kubitschek (disambiguation)
