= JK (TV series) =

- Genre: Miniseries
- Created by: Maria Adelaide Amaral; Alcides Nogueira
- Directed by: Dennis Carvalho
- Starring: José Wilker; Marília Pêra
- Opening theme: Peixe Vivo, by Milton Nascimento
- Country of origin: Brazil
- Original language: Portuguese
- No. of episodes: 47

Production
- Running time: 40 minutes

Original release
- Network: Globo
- Release: January 3 – March 24, 2006

Related
- Hoje É Dia de Maria: Segunda Jornada; Amazônia, de Galvez a Chico Mendes

JK is a 2006 Brazilian television series created by Maria Adelaide Amaral and Alcides Nogueira, based on the biography of former president of Brazil Juscelino Kubitschek.

== Plot ==
JK tells the history Juscelino Kubitschek's life, from poor childhood in Diamantina, Minas Gerais, through the ascension to the position of President of Brazil, until his death in an auto accident in 1976.

== Cast ==
Actor	Character
José Wilker	Juscelino Kubitschek
Marília Pêra	Sarah Kubitschek
Wagner Moura	Juscelino Kubitschek (jovem)
Debora Falabella	Sarah Kubitschek (jovem)
César Cardadeiro	Juscelino Kubitschek (adolescente)
Caco Ciocler	Leonardo Faria
Deborah Evelyn	Salomé
Júlia Lemmertz	Júlia Kubitschek
Luís Mello	Cel. Licurgo Almeida
Cássia Kiss	Dona Maria Gonçalves de Almeida
Dan Stulbach	Zinque (Washington Gonçalves de Almeida)
Letícia Sabatella	Marisa Soares
Alessandra Negrini	Yedda Ovalle Schimdt
Cássio Gabus Mendes	Gaúcho
Mariana Ximenes	Lilian Gonçalves
Camila Morgado	Ana Rosenberg
Antônio Calloni	Augusto Frederico Schmidt
Louise Cardoso	Luisinha Negrão
Eva Wilma	Luisinha Negrão (2ª fase)
Nathalia Timberg	Baronesa de Tibagi
Débora Bloch	Dora Amar
José de Abreu	Carlos Frederico Werneck de Lacerda
Otávio Augusto	Governador Benedito Valadares
Paulo Betti	José Maria Alkmin
Jorge Botelho	Luthero Viana
Betty Gofman	Abigail Fernandes
Denise Del Vecchio	Naná (Maria da Conceição Kubitschek)
Hugo Carvana	Jorge Sampaio
Marília Gabriela	Celita Bueno Cavallini
Isabela Garcia	Déa Pinheiro
Tato Gabus Mendes	Júlio Soares
Samara Felippo	Maria Estela Kubitschek
Otávio Müller	Cel. Orozimbo Fialho
Xuxa Lopes	Camilinha Sampaio
Paulo Goulart	Israel Pinheiro
Guilhermina Guinle	Magui Sampaio
Dudu Azevedo	Cássio Machado
Paulo Nigro	Luís Felipe Bueno Cavallini
Júlia Almeida	Helô Machado
Regina Braga	Alzira Gonçalves
Emílio de Mello	Carlos Murilo Felício dos Santos
Sérgio Viotti	Adolpho Bloch
Ricardo Blat	Thales da Rocha Viana
Ilya São Paulo	Joaquim
Maria Manoella	Celeste
Ranieri Gonzalez	José Maria Alkmin
Yaçanã Martins	Assunta Bonfim
André Frateschi	Odilon Behrens
Marcelo Laham	Thales da Rocha Viana
Pedro Garcia Netto	Pedro Nava
Daniel Dantas	Dr. Raul
Christiana Guinle	Dona Coracy
Mateus Solano	Júlio Soares
Thais Garayp	Dona Cota
André Barros	Clóvis Pinto
Marcelo Várzea	Gabriel Passos
Juliana Mesquita	Naná (Maria da Conceição Kubitschek)
Mila Moreira	Maria Alice
Patrícia Werneck	Silvinha
Marco Antônio Pâmio	Wilsinho
Ana Carbatti	Guiomar
Rafaella Mandelli	Amélia Lemos Passos
Rodrigo Penna	Oscar Niemeyer
Tuna Dwek	Madame Olímpia Garcia
Ana Cecília Costa	Maria Madalena dos Santos
John Vaz	João Goulart
Lucci Ferreira	Antenor
Adriano Stuart	Genaro Cavallini
Cláudia Netto	Carmen Dulce
Murilo Grossi	Affonso Heliodoro dos Santos
Andréia Horta	Márcia Kubitschek (II)
Hélio Cícero	Renato Archer
Maria Laura Nogueira	Virgininha
Arthur Kohl	Marechal Henrique Teixeira Lott
Fábio Lago	Severino
Cláudio Jaborandy	Zé
Rosanne Mulholland	Maria Luísa Lemos Pinto
Luíza Mariani	Idalina Lemos Vasconcelos
Domingos Meira	Sérgio Sá
Gabriela Hes	Judite Gonçalves
Isabella Parkinson	Cândida
Rafael Miguel	Antenor
Ida Gomes	Sister Maria
