= Kubizek =

Kubizek is a surname. Notable people with the surname include:

- August Kubizek (1888–1956), close friend of Adolf Hitler
- Augustin Kubizek (1918–2009), Austrian choir conductor and composer
- Leonhard Kubizek (born 1963), Austrian clarinetist, mental-coach and counsellor

== See also ==
- Kubíček, a surname
- Kubitschek, a surname
