= Kuba (surname) =

Kuba is a Czech (feminine: Kubová) and Japanese surname. In Czech, Kuba is a pet form of the given name Jakub. Notable people with the surname include:

- Filip Kuba (born 1976), Czech ice hockey player
- Gabriela Kubová (born 1993), Czech ice dancer
- Ludvík Kuba (1863–1956), Czech artist and musician
- Martin Kuba (born 1973), Czech politician
- Masatomo Kuba (born 1984), Japanese footballer
- Paula Kubová (born 1986), Slovak volleyball player
- Simona Kubová (born 1991), Czech swimmer

== See also ==
- Kubíček
- Kubitschek
