= Kuybyshevsky District, Russia =

Location of Kaluga Oblast

Location of Novosibirsk Oblast

Location of Rostov Oblast

Kuybyshevsky District is the name of several administrative and municipal districts in Russia. The districts are generally named for Valerian Kuybyshev, a Soviet statesman.

== Districts of the federal subjects ==
- Kuybyshevsky District, Kaluga Oblast, an administrative and municipal district of Kaluga Oblast
- Kuybyshevsky District, Novosibirsk Oblast, an administrative and municipal district of Novosibirsk Oblast
- Kuybyshevsky District, Rostov Oblast, an administrative and municipal district of Rostov Oblast

== City divisions ==
- Kuybyshevsky City District, Irkutsk, a city district of Irkutsk, the administrative center of Irkutsk Oblast
- Kuybyshevsky City District, Novokuznetsk, a city district of Novokuznetsk, a city in Kemerovo Oblast
- Kuybyshevsky City District, Samara, an administrative and municipal city district of Samara, the administrative center of Samara Oblast
Cities in Russia with a city division called "Kuybyshevsky"

== Renamed districts ==
- Kuybyshevsky District, name of Spassky District of the Republic of Tatarstan, in 1935–1991

== Historical districts ==
- Kuybyshevsky District, Saint Petersburg, a former district of the federal city of St. Petersburg merged into newly created Tsentralny District in March 1994

== See also ==
- Kuybyshevsky (disambiguation)
- Kuybyshev (disambiguation)
