= Júlia Kubitschek (Coronel Fabriciano) =

Brazilian neighborhood

- Neighborhood of Coronel Fabriciano
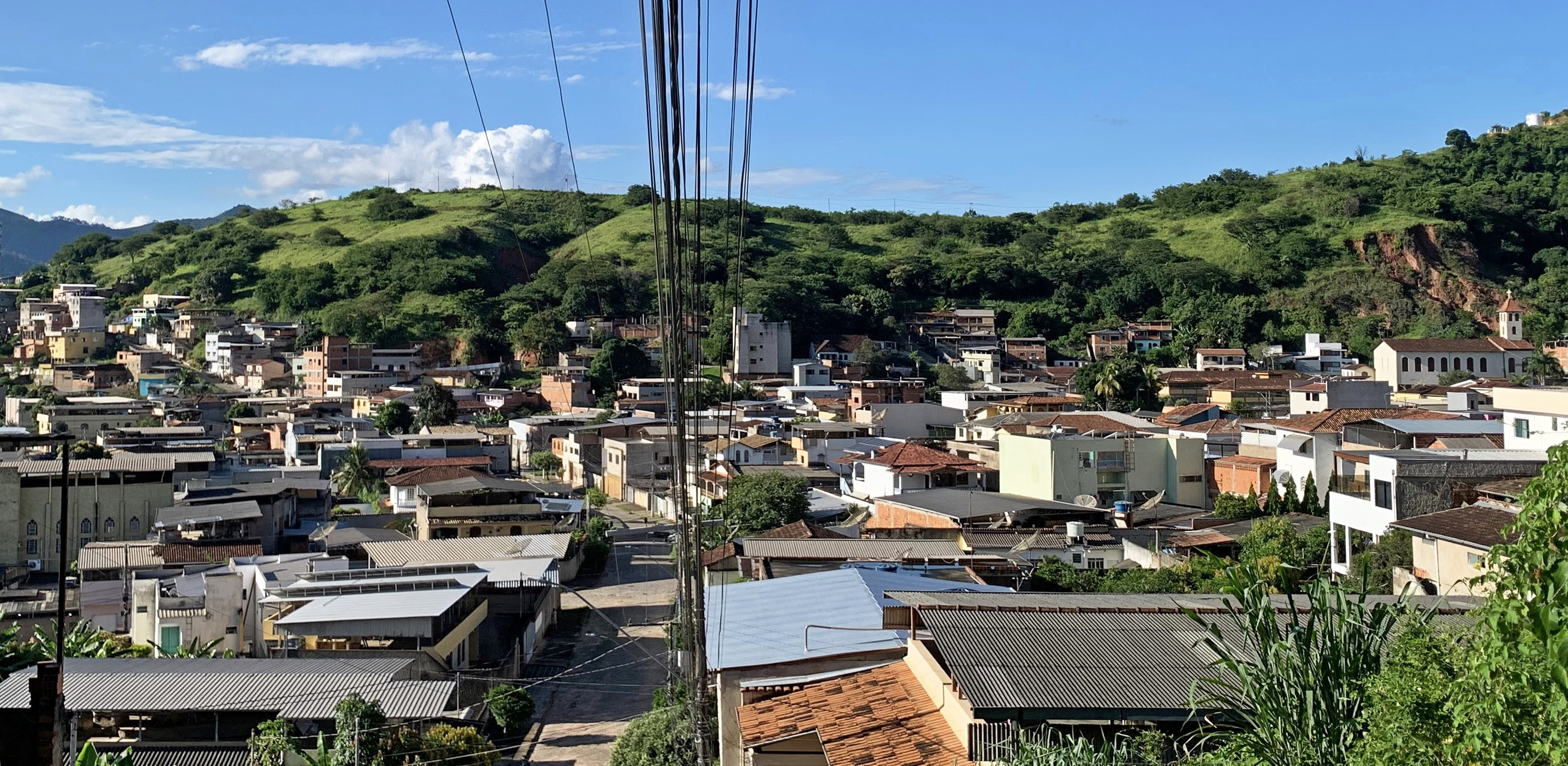
- View of the Júlia Kubitschek neighborhood

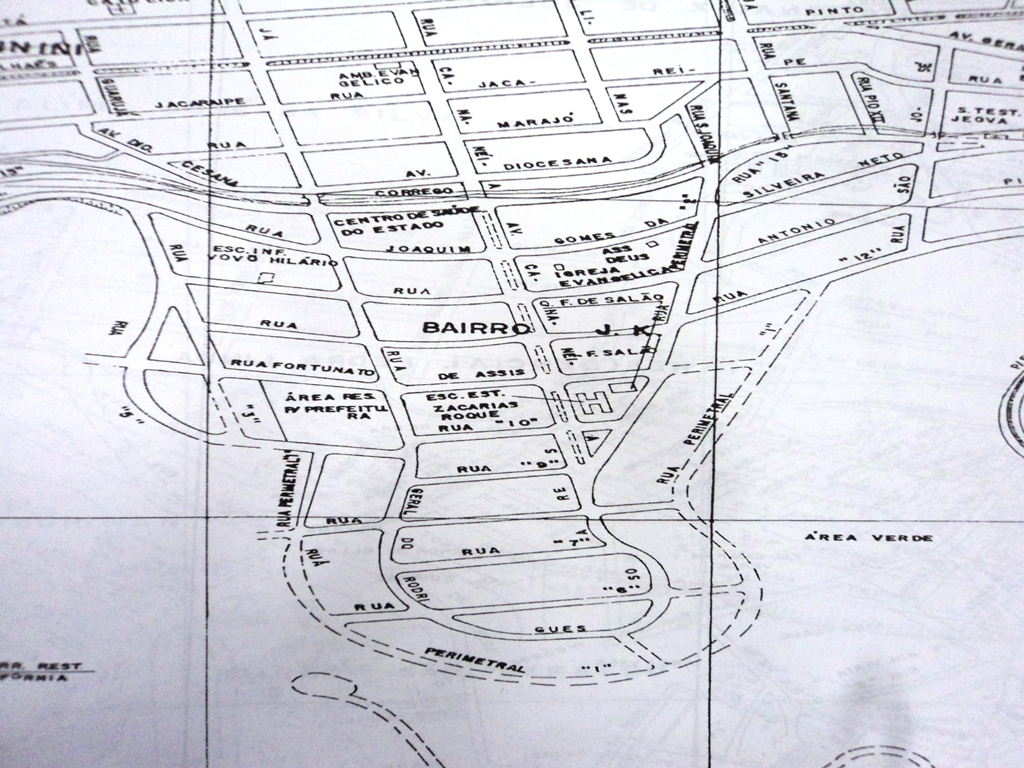
- Map of the Júlia Kubitschek neighborhood
- Coordinates: 19°30′31″S 42°37′12″W
- Country: Brazil
- State: Minas Gerais
- Municipality/City: Coronel Fabriciano
- Zone: Senador Melo Viana District

Area
  - Total: 1.4 km^{2} (0.54 sq mi)

Population
  - Total: 3,452
  - Density: 2.39/km^{2} (6.2/sq mi)

Júlia Kubitschek (formerly Professora Júlia Kubitschek), popularly known as JK, is a neighborhood in the Brazilian municipality of Coronel Fabriciano, in the interior of the state of Minas Gerais. It is located in the Senador Melo Viana district, in Sector 4. According to the Brazilian Institute of Geography and Statistics (IBGE), its population in 2010 was 3,452 inhabitants (3.3% of the municipality's total), distributed over an area of 1.4 km^{2}.

The area, which belonged to the Archdiocese of Mariana until the late 1960s, was allotted and the neighborhood was officially created in 1971, under the mandate of Mayor Mariano Pires Pontes. It was named after Júlia Kubitschek, the mother of former president Juscelino Kubitschek, who had died that same year. Kubitschek attended the founding ceremony of the neighborhood, which initially had only a few houses. In the following decades, the population grew and the neighborhood acquired infrastructure and commerce.

== History ==
Until the late 1960s, the area of the current neighborhood belonged to the Archdiocese of Mariana and was administered by Father Rocha, the local parish priest, as were the lands of the current neighborhoods of São Domingos, Recanto Verde and Bom Jesus. After he became ill, his properties were sold or given to other administrators. The land was bought by Fábio Xavier Pinheiro in 1970, who converted it into Bom Jesus Farm. Part of the area was allotted by Empreendimentos Novo Reno Ltda. in 1971, and the rest, in the rural perimeter, remained Fabio's property.

The name of the neighborhood was suggested by the then federal deputy Aníbal Teixeira de Souza, a friend of Fábio's, to honor Professor Júlia Kubitschek, mother of former president Juscelino Kubitschek, who had died that same year. He attended the founding ceremony of the JK, the abbreviation by which the residential area is now known. The designation was formalized by Fabriciano's Executive and Legislative branches during the term of Mayor Mariano Pires Pontes. When Juscelino Kubitschek visited, the neighborhood had few streets and houses and no water supply or sewage collection. During heavy rains, there were floods in the lower part and major landslides in the upper part. In the 1980s, the area began to develop structurally and demographically.

On October 1, 1982, the Zacarias Roque State School was founded, the first large school that had operated since 1964 in the Bom Jesus neighborhood and was transferred to a larger space in JK. Its name pays homage to José Zacarias da Silva Roque, the first notary of the Melo Viana district, which became the municipality of Coronel Fabriciano in 1948. In 1984, the Community Association of Residents of Bairro JK was created (now inactive) and in 1985, the Church of Our Lady of Lourdes was inaugurated. In the 1990s, there was an expansion of electricity supply services, sewage systems and bus routes.

== Geography and demography ==
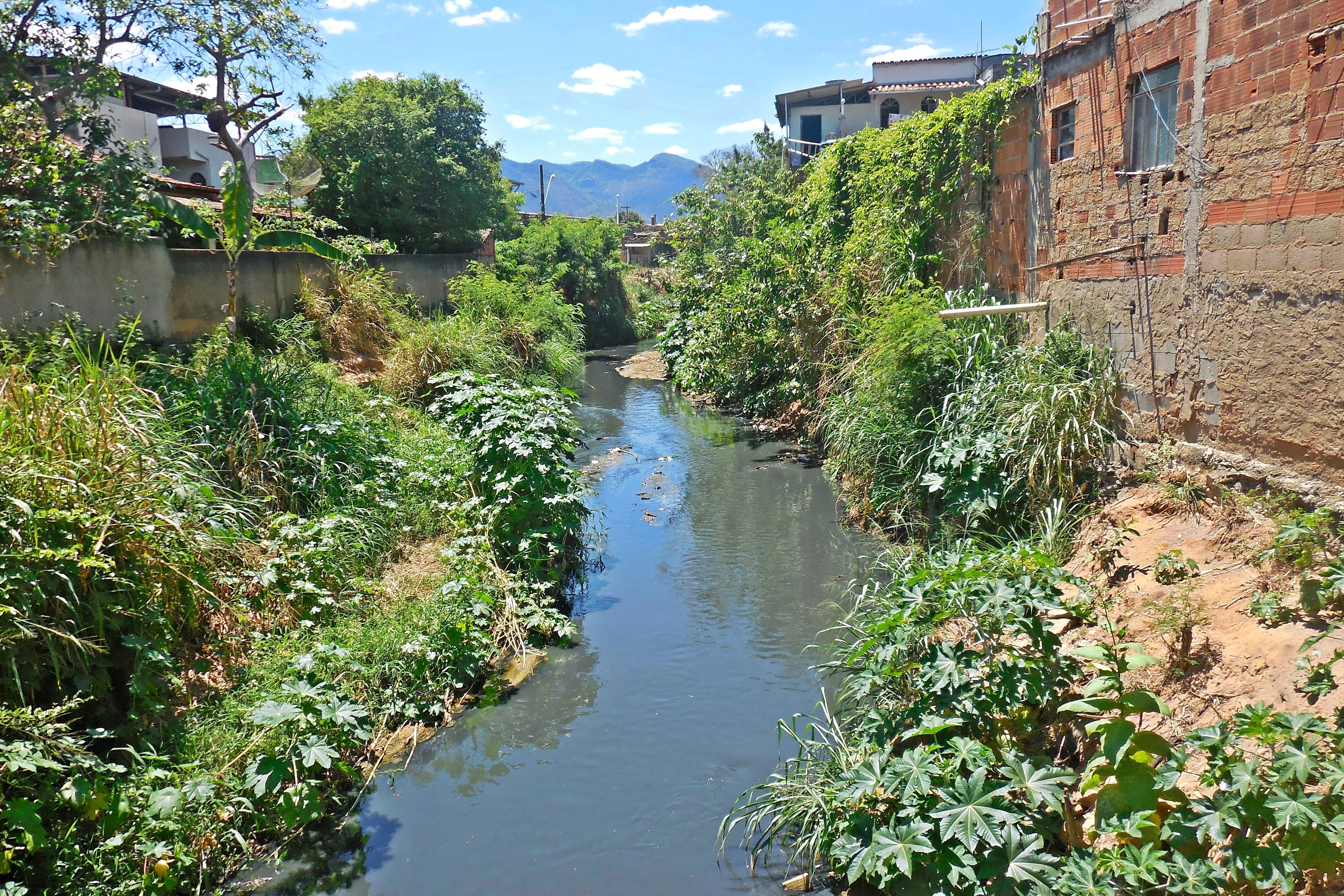
Caladão Stream between the Melo Viana and Júlia Kubitschek neighborhoods.

The Júlia Kubitschek neighborhood has a total area of 1.4 km^{2} and is bordered by the districts of Melo Viana (to the north and east), Giovannini, Vila Bom Jesus (to the east), Bom Jesus and Nova Tijuca (to the south). It is bordered by the Caladão Stream, which cuts through the city and receives dirt and pollution from homes and small industries, workshops or slaughterhouses on its banks. Deforestation of the area began in 1970 when the land was cleared for allotment. When the residential nucleus was created in 1971, there were still a few houses and several undamaged places, but urbanization occurred during the 1970s and 1980s. The lack of vegetation on the hills led to frequent flooding during heavy rains, but structural improvements were made in the 1990s that reduced the damage caused by intense storms.

In 2010, the Brazilian Institute of Geography and Statistics (IBGE) estimated that 3 452 inhabitants lived in the neighborhood, which is comparable to cities in Minas Gerais such as São Félix de Minas, Fernandes Tourinho and Jaguaraçu. Among the 63 neighborhoods in Fabriciano, Júlia Kubitschek ranked eighth among the most populous, comprising 3.3% of the municipal population and 6.7% of the population of the Senador Melo Viana district, with a population density of 2,390.82 inhabitants per square kilometer. Of the total number of inhabitants, 1,662 were men (48.1% of the total) and 1,790 women (51.9%), distributed in 1,121 households. Part of JK is also included among the city's 20 informal settlements, with a total of 1,162 residents combined with the neighboring Melo Viana district. The Church of Our Lady of Lourdes is the seat of the Community of Our Lady of Lourdes, whose Catholic pastoral work is subordinate to the Parish of Saint Anthony, under the jurisdiction of the Diocese of Itabira-Fabriciano.

== Infrastructure and leisure ==
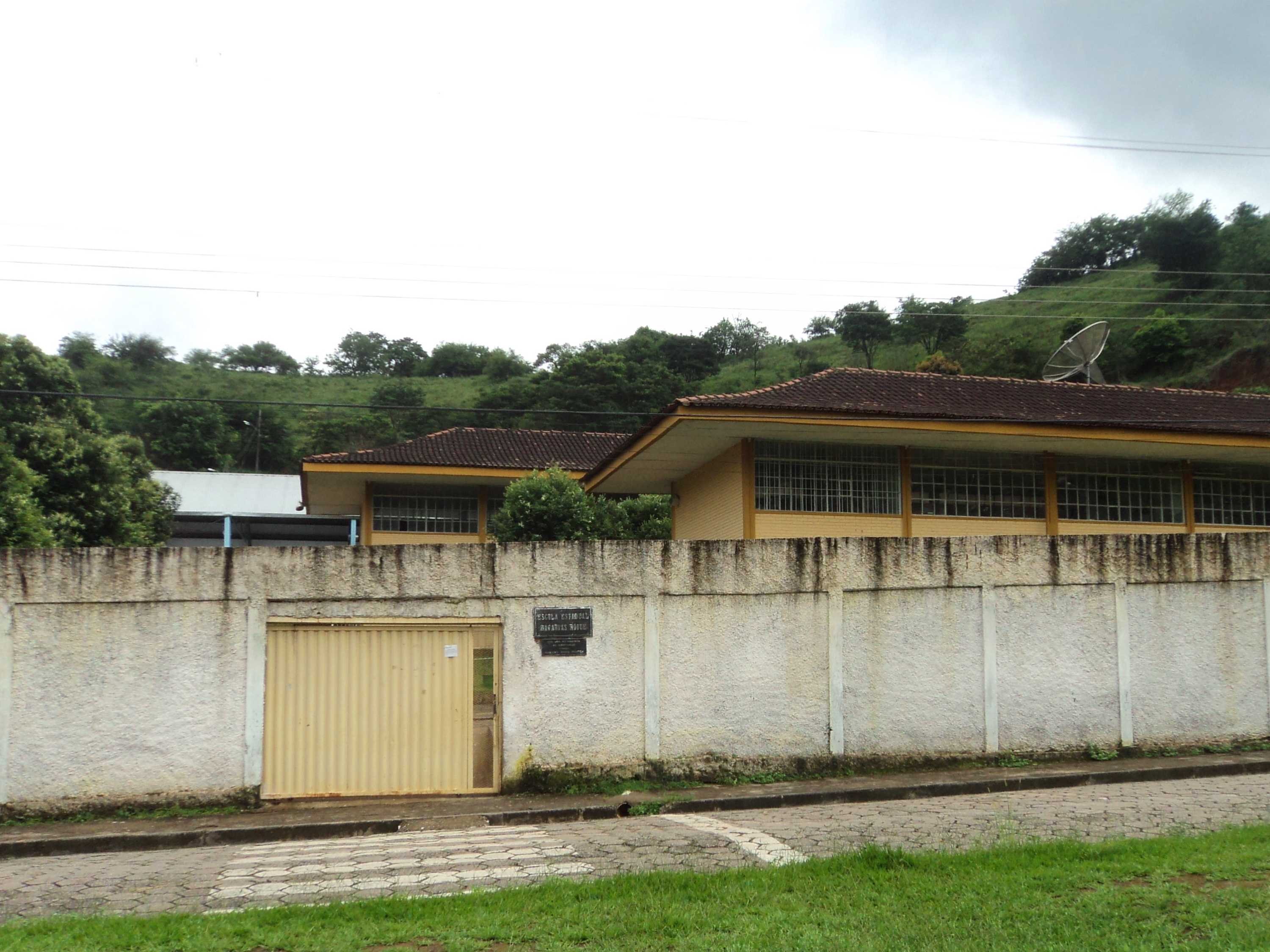
Entrance of the Zacarias Roque State School.

The Zacarias Roque State School is located in the Júlia Kubitschek neighborhood and provides elementary education. It was created in the Bom Jesus neighborhood in 1964 and moved to JK in 1984. On June 9, 2014, the Sonho de Criança Municipal Early Childhood Education Center (CMEI) was inaugurated, serving children from six months to five years of age in preschool. There is also a basic care unit, which is run by the Municipal Health Department (SMS) and offers basic care and consultations to the population and nursing services, as well as serving as a vaccination post during vaccination campaigns.

The water supply service is provided by Companhia de Saneamento de Minas Gerais (Copasa), while the electricity supply is the responsibility of Companhia Energética de Minas Gerais (Cemig), with 100% of the population having access to the electricity network. There are municipal public transport bus lines that serve the neighborhood directly or nearby areas that cross Júlia Kubitschek.

The neighborhood's main attraction is the Church of Our Lady of Lourdes, inaugurated in 1985. Leisure activities for the population, often organized by the local Presbyterian Church and the Community of Our Lady of Lourdes, stand out. On October 12, children's toys and plays are prepared to commemorate Children's Day. The Zacarias Roque State School also organizes events aimed at the population, such as environmental awareness campaigns and educational talks. There are also June festivals, held by schools and churches, where square dancing is performed and typical food is sold and consumed, bringing together the population of JK and nearby neighborhoods.

== Gallery ==
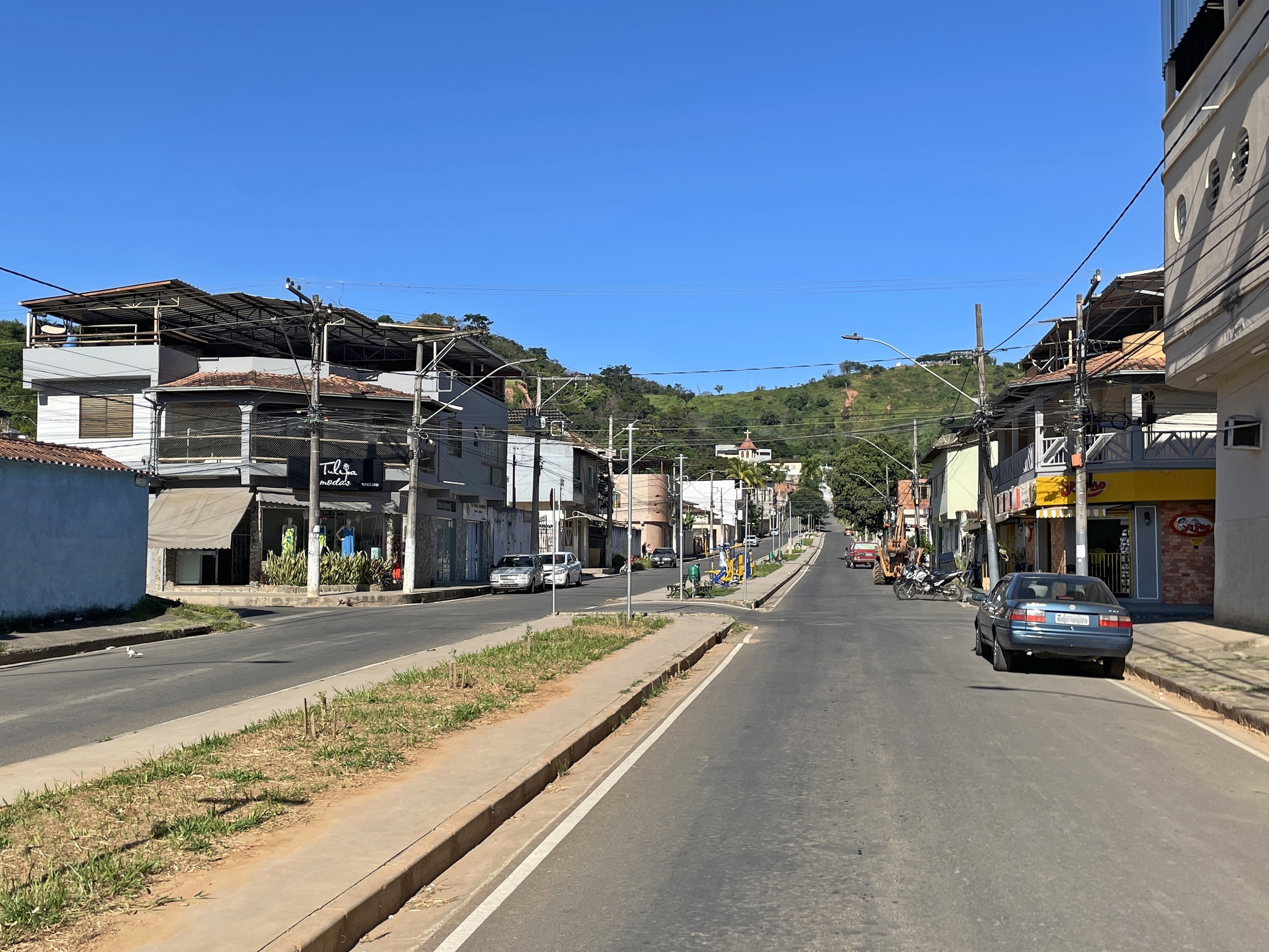
Cananeia Avenue, where commerce is concentrated.

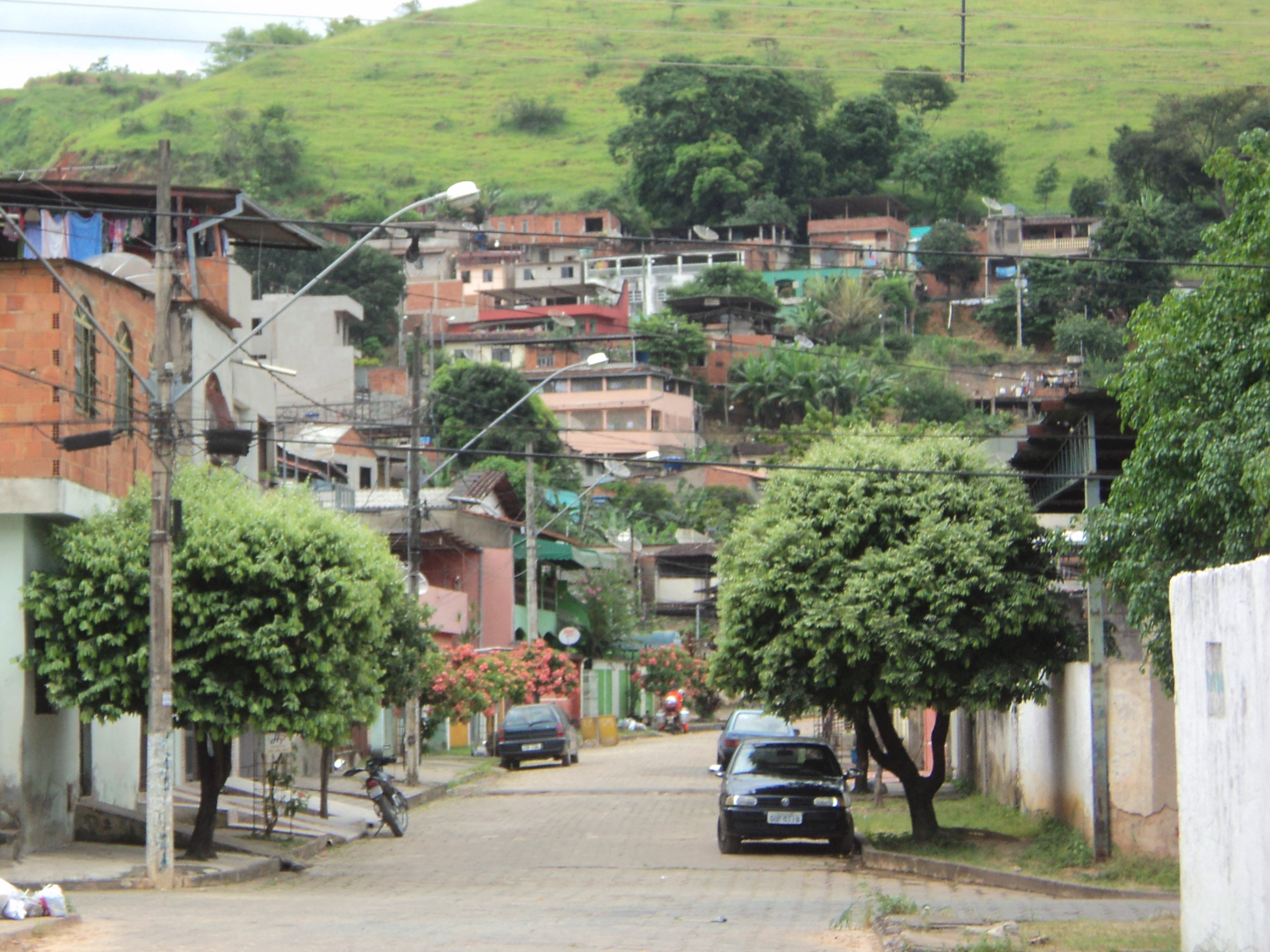
View from Antônio Pinto Street.

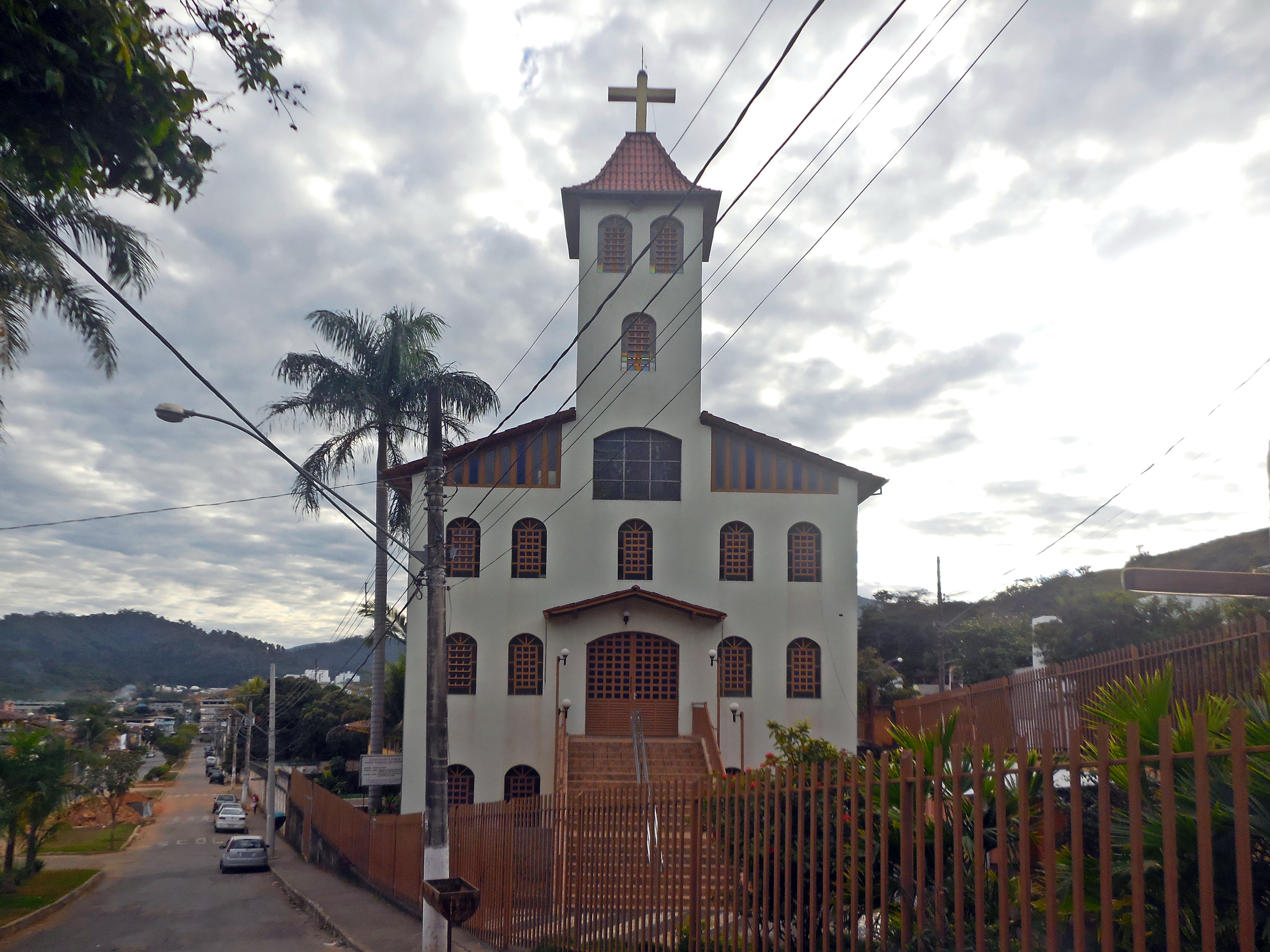
Facade of the Church of Our Lady of Lourdes.

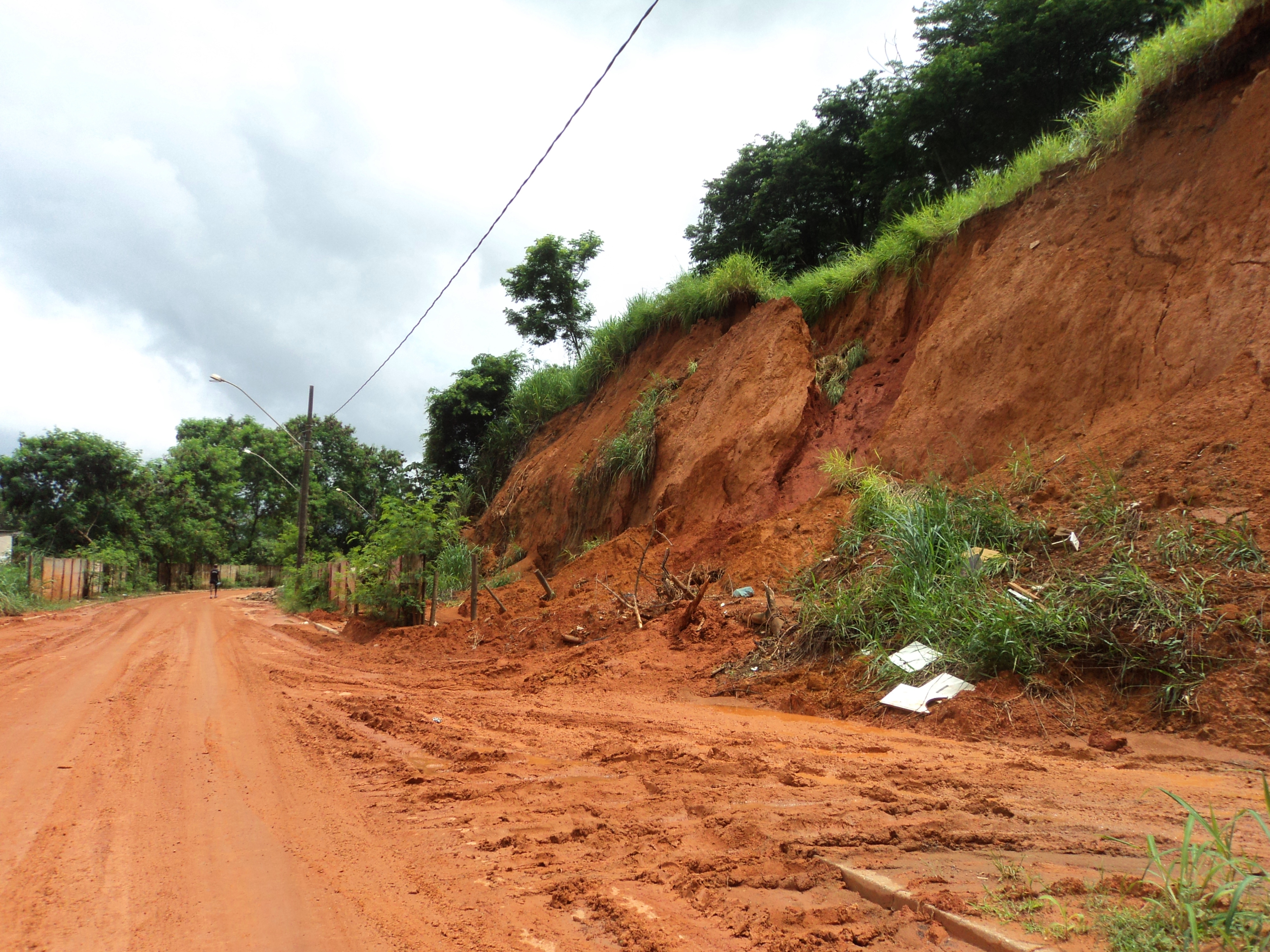
Erosion on a hill in the JK neighborhood after heavy rains.

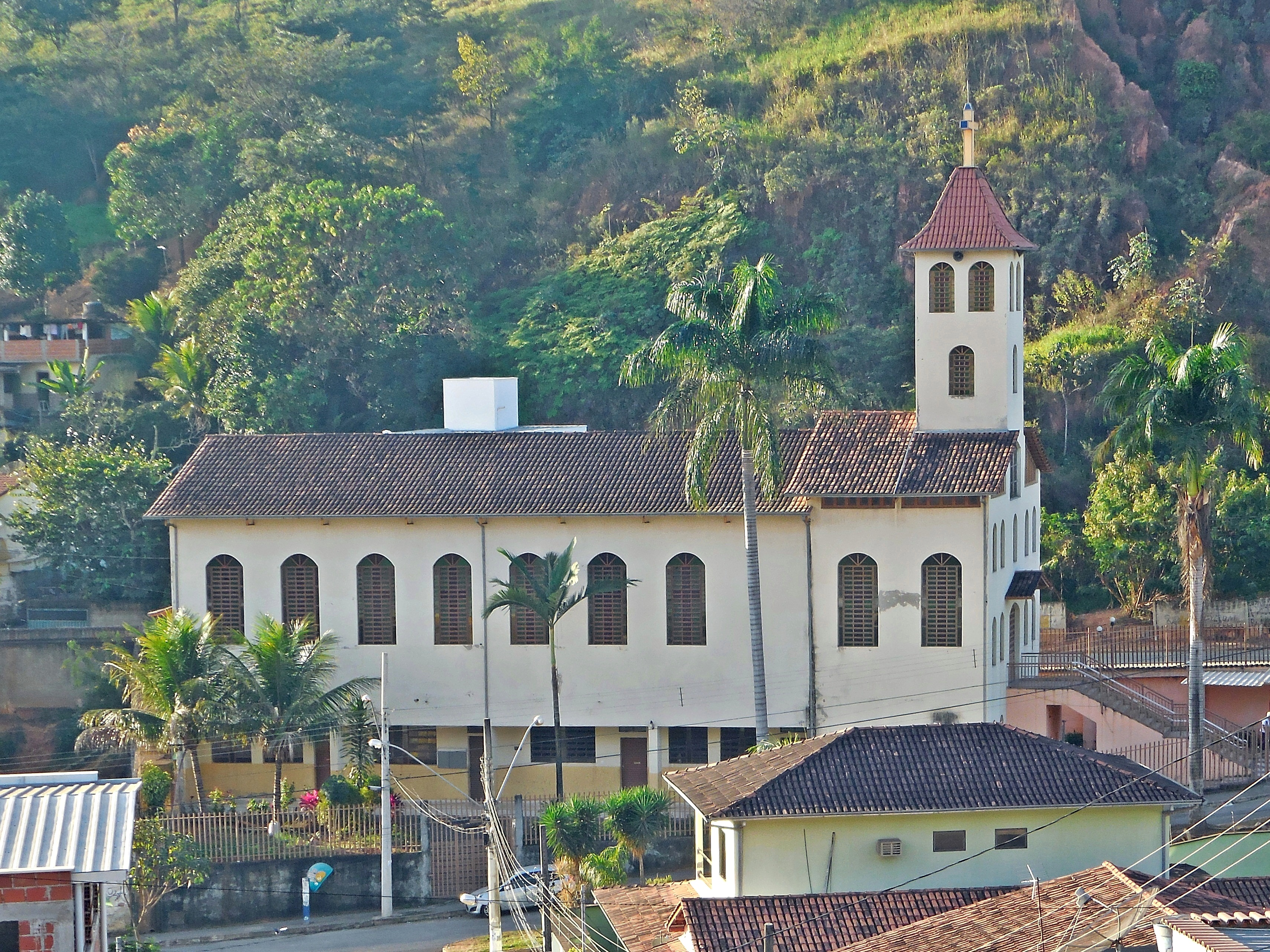
View of the Church of Our Lady of Lourdes.

== See also ==
- List of neighborhoods of Coronel Fabriciano
- History of Coronel Fabriciano
