= Kubíček =

Kubíček (feminine: Kubíčková) is a Czech surname, a diminutive of Kuba. Notable people with the surname include:

- Jan Kubíček (1927–2013), Czech constructivist-concrete painter, sculptor and designer
- Petr Kubíček (born 1957), Czech sprint canoer
- Tomáš Kubíček (born 1962), Czech fencer

== See also ==
- Kubicek Balloons, Czech manufacturer of hot-air balloons and airships
- Kubicki, a surname
- Kubizek, a surname
- Kubitschek (disambiguation)
