= Kuybyshev =

Kuybyshev or Kuibyshev may refer to:

== People ==
- Valerian Kuybyshev (1888–1935), Russian revolutionary
- Nikolay Kuybyshev (Kuybyshev) (1893–1938), Russian Red Army commander; brother of Valerian
- Valerian Kuybyshev (equestrian) (1925 – 2006), Soviet equestrian

== Places ==
Several places in the Soviet Union were named after the Bolshevik revolutionary Valerian Kuybyshev.

=== Armenia ===
- Kuybyshev, Armenia, a town in the Lori Province, now named Urasar
- Kuybyshev, in 1940–1992, name of Haghartsin, a town in Tavush Province

=== Azerbaijan ===
- Kuybışev, former name of Aran, Aghjabadi, a village in the Aghjabadi Rayon
- Kuybyshev, former name of Ölcələr, a village in Imishli Rayon

=== Russia ===
- Kuybyshev, one of the largest cities in the Russian SFSR in the old Soviet Union, restored to its former name of Samara in 1991 and currently the 8th largest city in Russia.
- Kuybyshev Oblast, name of Samara Oblast in 1936–1990
- Kuybyshev Reservoir (or Kuybyshev Sea), a reservoir in Russia; the largest in Europe
- Kuybyshev, Russia, several inhabited localities in Russia
- Kuybyshev Urban Settlement, a municipal formation into which the town of Kuybyshev in Kuybyshevsky District of Novosibirsk Oblast is incorporated
- Kuybyshev Square in Samara

=== Tajikistan ===
- Kuybyshev, alternative name of Kuybyshevsk, a location in Khatlon Province, Tajikistan

== Other uses ==
- Valerian Kuybyshev-class motorship, a class of Russian river passenger ships
  - Valerian Kuybyshev (ship) (1975), a Soviet/Russian river cruise ship of that class, cruising in the Volga–Neva basin
- Kuybyshev Railway, a subsidiary of the Russian Railways headquartered in Samara, Russia
- Kuybyshev Hydroelectric Station, former name of Zhiguli Hydroelectric Station

== See also ==
- Kuybyshevsky (disambiguation)
- Kuybyshevo (disambiguation)
- Kubitschek (disambiguation)
