= Kubitschek Plaza =

Coordinates: 15.7901°S 47.8866°W

Kubitschek Plaza is a 5-star luxury hotel located in Brasília, Brazil. It is named after President Juscelino Kubitschek, founder of Brasília. Its part of the Plaza Brasília Hotels along with Manhattan Plaza, Brasília Palace and St. Paul Plaza. The hotel comprises 389 suites and apartments distributed on 17 stories, 2 restaurants, 3 bars, a swimming pool, sauna and fitness center, a business center and facilities for meetings and conventions.
