= Kathrine Kubicki =

Danish handball player (born 1994)

Personal information
- Full name: Kathrine Kubicki Nissen
- Nationality: Danish
- Born: 6 April 1994 (age 32)
- Height: 171 cm (5 ft 7 in)

Sport
- Sport: Handball
- Position: Left wing
- Current club: SønderjyskE Håndbold
- Number: 77

Youth career
- Years: Team
- 2013-2013: SønderjyskE Håndbold

Senior clubs
- Years: Team
- 2013-2015: SønderjyskE Håndbold
- 2015-2017: DHG Odense
- 2017-2018: Ajax København
- 2018-2020: Horsens HK
- 2020-2021: SønderjyskE Håndbold

Kathrine Kubicki Nissen (born 6 April 1994) is a Danish former handball player, who retired in 2021 while playing for SønderjyskE Håndbold.
