= Urasar =

Urasar Ուրասար
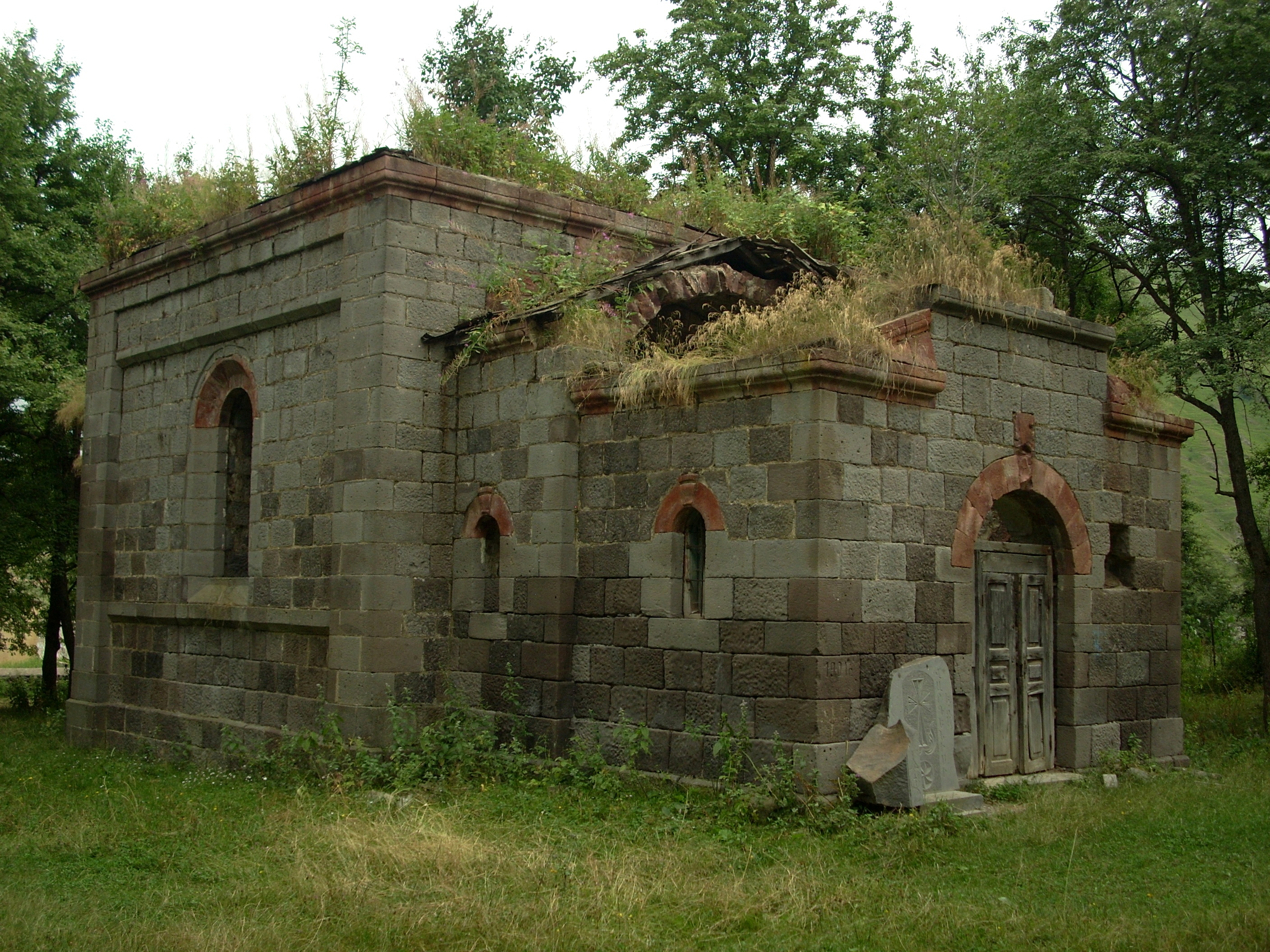
- Urasar Holy Mother of God Church

- Location within Armenia
- Coordinates: 41°00′55″N 44°16′48″E
- Country: Armenia
- Marz (Province): Lori Province
- Elevation: 1,525 m (5,003 ft)

Population (2011)
  - Total: 347
- Time zone: UTC+4 ( )
  - Summer (DST): UTC+5 ( )

Urasar (Armenian: Ուրասար) is a town in Armenia's Lori Province.
