= Kubicek (disambiguation) =

Kubicek may refer to:

- Kubíček, a Czech surname
- Kubicek Balloons, a Czech company
