= Gunnar Rugstad =

Norwegian musicologist

Gunnar Rugstad (5 January 1921 − 14 June 2000) was a Norwegian musicologist.

He was born in Gjerpen Municipality, and his own main instrument was the trombone. As a musician he was hired in the orchestra of Chat Noir in 1940. He left Norway for Sweden during the German occupation of Norway, playing in the orchestra of the Norwegian police troops in Sweden. From 1946 to 1968 he was a trombonist in Kringkastingsorkesteret, playing solo in works arranged for his instrument. After leaving the Kringkastingsorkesteret, he was a sometime soloist in the Musikselkabet Harmonien.

Rugstad studied music at the Oslo Conservatory of Music and musicology at the University of Oslo, graduating with a magistratus degree in 1953. From 1968 to 1974, he was an associate professor of Norwegian folk music at the University of Bergen. In the first phase, he mainly worked with Arne Bjørndal's folk music collection, before being granted a research fellowship to study the composer Christian Sinding. In 1977 he took the dr.philos. degree with a thesis about Christian Sinding. From 1974 to 1988, Rugstad headed the music department of the Norwegian Broadcasting Corporation. The appointment in 1974 was praised by music writers such as Mona Levin. Dagbladet had suggested Rugstad as a director of the Norwegian National Opera.

From 1967 to 1968 he also chaired the modernist music organization Ny Musikk. He was a board member of the Oslo Conservatory of Music and the Bergen Music Conservatory, and a subcommittee in the Arts Council Norway for recording older classical works. As a music critic, Rugstad among others wrote for Aftenposten.

The thesis about Christian Sinding was published as a biography in 1979 by Cappelen. The biography received favourable reviews, albeit with some reviewers commenting that the study was quite specialized.

After retiring from his professional career, he studied Frederick Delius. Gunnar Rugstad died in 2000, aged 79.

Preceded by Finn Mortensen	Chair of Ny Musikk; 1967–1968	Succeeded by Kjell Skyllstad
