= Márcia Kubitschek =

Brazilian journalist and politician

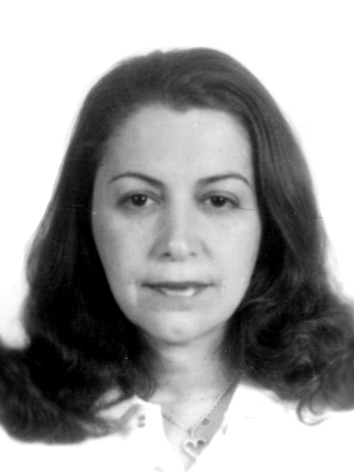

Deputy Governor of the Federal District
- In office 1 January 1991 – 1 January 1995
- Governor: Joaquim Roriz
- Preceded by: Wanderley Vallim da Silva
- Succeeded by: Arlete Avelar Sampaio

Federal deputy
- In office 1 February 1987 – 1 January 1991
- President: José Sarney
- Constituency: Federal District

Personal details
- Born: 22 October 1943
- Died: 5 August 2000 (aged 56)

Márcia Lemos Kubitschek de Oliveira (22 October 1943 – 5 August 2000) was a Brazilian journalist and politician. The daughter of former president Juscelino Kubitschek and Sarah Kubitschek, she served as a federal deputy and as vice-governor of the Federal District.
