= Jadwiga Kubicka =

Polish activist and writer

- Cover of Nie zabijaj (1917)
- Other name: Kor-Ja
- Occupations: Activist; writer
- Known for: Animal protection and vegetarianism activism
- Notable work: Nie zabijaj ("Thou Shalt Not Kill"; 1917)

Jadwiga Kubicka (Polish pronunciation: [jadˈviɡa kuˈbit͡ska]), known by the pseudonym Kor-Ja, was a Polish animal protection and vegetarianism advocate, and writer. She was a member of the Towarzystwo Opieki nad Zwierzętami w Warszawie ("Warsaw Society for the Protection of Animals"), on whose behalf she gave lectures on animal protection and vegetarianism, and contributed to the society's periodical, Przyjaciel Zwierząt ("The Animals' Friend"). In 1917, she published Nie zabijaj ("Thou Shalt Not Kill"), a pamphlet opposing the killing of animals for food.

== Activism and writing ==
Kubicka was active in the Towarzystwo Opieki nad Zwierzętami w Warszawie ("Warsaw Society for the Protection of Animals"), where she worked to disseminate information about the treatment of animals. She gave public lectures on animal protection and vegetarianism and collaborated with the editorial staff of Przyjaciel Zwierząt ("The Animals' Friend"), the society's journal. According to Łukasz Smaga, her vegetarianism was principally motivated by ethical concern for animals.

In 1917, under the name Kor-Ja, Kubicka published the 32-page pamphlet Nie zabijaj ("Thou Shalt Not Kill") at her own expense in Warsaw. In it, she presented vegetarianism primarily as a response to the suffering and killing of animals, while also drawing on religious and health arguments.

Kubicka criticised people who showed affection towards cats and dogs while accepting the killing of other animals for food. She rejected the argument that animals had been created for human consumption and described meat-eating as a practice inherited from an earlier stage of human society. She also invoked the biblical commandment "Thou shalt not kill", arguing that causing harm to sentient creatures was inconsistent with divine justice.

She drew on contemporary arguments about diet, referring to writers and physicians including Hélène Sosnowska, Paul Carton and Juliusz Bandrowski, and argued that a vegetarian diet could benefit health. She anticipated a future in which later generations would regard the killing and eating of animals with horror.

Kubicka also criticised the consumption of dairy products. Writing about dairy production, she described the suffering of cows whose calves were taken from them.

== Publications ==
- Nie zabijaj [Thou Shalt Not Kill]. Warsaw. 1917.

== See also ==
- History of vegetarianism
- Women and vegetarianism and veganism advocacy
- Women and animal advocacy
