= Kuybyshevsky =

Kuybyshevsky (masculine), Kuybyshevskaya (feminine), or Kuybyshevskoye (neuter) may refer to:

- Kuybyshevsky District (disambiguation), name of several districts and city districts in the countries of the former Soviet Union
- Kuybyshevsky (rural locality), a rural locality (a settlement) in Samara Oblast, Russia
- Kuybyshev Oblast (Kuybyshevskaya oblast), name of Samara Oblast, Russia, in 1936–1990
- Kuybyshev Reservoir (Kuybyshevskoye vodokhranilishche), a large artificial lake
- Samara, formerly known as Kuybyshev

== See also ==
- Kuybyshev (disambiguation)
