= JK Memorial =

- Memorial JK
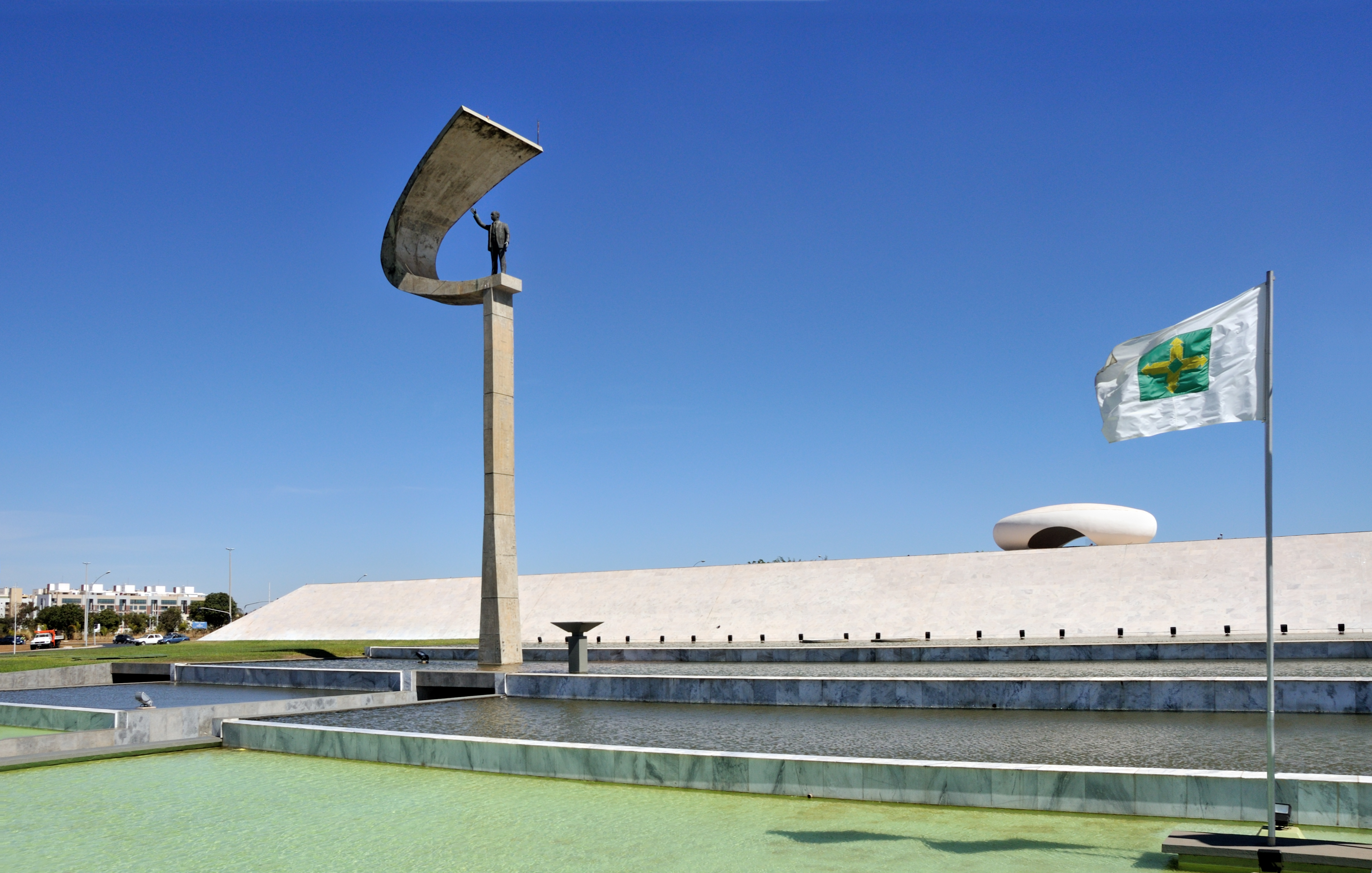
- Established: 1981
- Location: Zona Cívico-Administrativa, Eixo Monumental, Brasília
- Coordinates: 15.7842063°S 47.9155431°W
- Type: Museum, memorial, mausoleum
- Architect: Oscar Niemeyer
- Website: memorialjk.com.br

The JK Memorial is a Brazilian mausoleum, presidential memorial and cultural center dedicated to Juscelino Kubitschek (1902–1976), the 21st President of Brazil and the founder of Brasília, capital city of Brazil since 1960. Designed by Oscar Niemeyer, the memorial is located in the Monumental Axis in Brasília. It is the final resting place of President Kubitschek. The Memorial was designed by architect Oscar Niemeyer, responsible for the main buildings of the Brazilia, at the request of Juscelino's widow and former First Lady Sarah Kubitschek.

== The Inside ==
You can see photos and objects from the lives of Juscelino and Sarah, such as the presidential sash and the clothes they wore at the inauguration, as well as the former president's tomb. Works by artists such as Athos Bulcão and Marianne Peretti complement the memorial's interior, Goiás. Outside the memorial is what is possibly the most famous statue of Juscelino, made by Honório Peçanha, which stands on a pedestal almost thirty meters above the ground. The idea for the shape and the pedestal was conceived by Niemeyer, who is said to have been inspired by the symbol of communism - which he has always denied, but which generated some controversy before its installation. The building, seen from the outside, is a block of white marble with few openings. The site is open from Tuesday to Sunday, between 9 am and 6 pm.

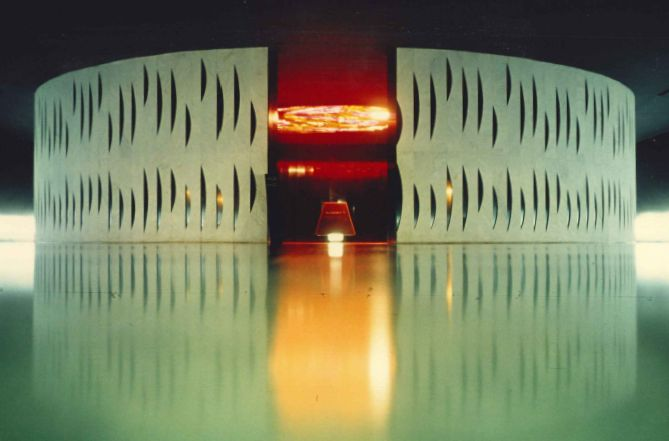
Inside view with tomb
