= Leonhard Kubizek =

Austrian musician, director, and authority

Leonhard Kubizek (born September 1, 1963) is an Austrian musician, director, and authority on Performer's Burn-Out-Syndrome and Mastermind behind mymozartScan. He is also the initiator of the 6/24-Supportainment-campaign.

== Life ==
Leonhard Kubizek was born in Krumau am Kamp in the Austrian Waldviertel on September 1, 1963, the son of cellist and violist da gamba Elli Lewinsky (1933-1987) and composer and choir director Augustin Kubizek (1918-2009). He was the second of four siblings; Gabriele Huß, Michael Kubizek and Maria Bader-Kubizek. He has played the piano since age four, learning with his parents and, since 1969, with Professor Renate Kramer-Preisenhammer. With nine years he practiced the clarinet under Rudolf Jettel at the then - Wiener Musikakademie.

== Career ==
=== Music ===
Kubizek made his first professional appearance at the age of 15, soon establishing a successful career as a solo clarinettist.

In 1982, he was awarded “Musician of the year” by the Austrian Broadcasting Corporation (ORF) and was a prize-winner at the International Young Musician of the year-contest.

In 1983, he made his debut as a soloist at the Salzburg Festival, playing Mozart's Clarinet Concerto, and had his first One-Man-Show at the Viennese Konzerthaus titled “Magicsound”.

Building up on the success and experience, he was able to play concerts around the globe, as well as work for Television, Radio and Record labels, providing the chance to work with world-renowned Orchestras (among others the Vienna Symphony and Royal Philharmonic Orchestra) and personalities like Leonard Bernstein.

=== Writing ===
In 1986, eight years after his first solo concert, Kubizek had a complete psychological and physical breakdown, which he would later refer to as “Performer's Burn-Out” or “Performer's Success Syndrome”.

He eventually went through reorientation, moving to the United States and using the name Pat Leonhard, studying Directing and Screenwriting, as well as clinical hypnosis and Neuro-Associative-Conditioning. He intensively researched various ways of learning, conditioning and reproduction of artistic and scientific potentials. As explorations went on, he developed a modern approach, these days known as mymozartScan, which he also taught at the University of Music and Performing Arts in Vienna.

He then gained a reputation as a mental coach and counsellor, working with performing artists, orchestras, TV companies and film productions, in addition to corporate clients in the US and Europe.

He has also worked as a sketch writer for a Pittsburgh-based TV comedy-program.

=== Other ventures ===
In 2000 Kubizek developed and designed the “beGeisterwerkstatt” in Austria, his home country. It was a tourism and theatre business he managed and ran until 2011. It provided possibilities for unconventional forms of entertainment and had 350,000 visitors. The experience delivered many insights about playful learning, and helped further develop mymozartScan.

Kubizek takes great concern in the destigmatization of Burn-out-Syndrome.

He also taught at the University of Music and Performing Arts in Vienna.

== Personal life ==
Kubizek has four children, and lives in Vienna, Austria.

== Bibliography ==
- 1989 Zauberalmanach; published by Perlenreihe
- 1990 Kopfwerkzeuge – Lernen/ Begreifen/ Behalten; published by Perlenreihe
- 1993 Erfolg wirkt Wunder – lerne richtig lernen; published by Creditanstalt-Bankverein
- 1997 Lernen für kluge Köpfe; published by Ariston Verlag
- 1997 Wie man Prüfungen besteht ohne sich anzustrengen; published by Ariston Verlag
- 1998 Erfolgsformel Psychoakustik; published by Orac Verlag
- 2007 Das Geheimnis des KIVER; published by Springer Verlag Vienna
- 2013 ENDLICH FREI von lästigem Lampenfieber, Nervosität und Prüfungsangst; published by Verlag Rampenlicht
