= Sarah Kubitschek =

First Lady of Brazil (1908–1996)

First Lady of Brazil
- In role January 31, 1956 – January 31, 1961
- President: Juscelino Kubitschek
- Preceded by: Beatriz Ramos
- Succeeded by: Eloá Quadros

First Lady of Minas Gerais
- In role January 31, 1951 – March 31, 1955
- Governor: Juscelino Kubitschek
- Preceded by: Déa Campos
- Succeeded by: Lia Salgado

First Lady of Belo Horizonte
- In role October 23, 1940 – October 30, 1945
- Mayor: Juscelino Kubitschek
- Preceded by: Clélia de Araújo
- Succeeded by: Maria José Tavares

Personal details
- Born: Sarah Luísa Gomes de Sousa Lemos; October 5, 1908 Belo Horizonte, Minas Gerais, Brazil
- Died: February 4, 1996 (aged 87) Brasília, Brazil
- Spouse: Juscelino Kubitschek (m. 1931; died 1976)
- Children: 2

Sarah Luísa Lemos Kubitschek de Oliveira GCC • GCIH, known as Dona Sarah Kubitschek (October 5, 1908 – February 4, 1996) was a Brazilian charity worker and First Lady of Brazil from 1956 to 1961, wife of President Juscelino Kubitschek.

She was the founder of the Organização de Pioneiras Sociais (Organization of Social Pioneers), which carried out charity works in Minas Gerais, including the founding of schools and daycares in the countryside, and distribution of clothing, food, wheelchairs and mechanical devices for the physically disabled. In addition, she set up flying hospitals in most of the states, and brought hospital boats made in Germany to the Amazon.

== Biography ==
=== Family ===
Sarah Luísa Gomes de Sousa Lemos was born into a family from Belo Horizonte, Minas Gerais; she was the daughter of federal deputy Jaime Gomes de Sousa Lemos and his wife, Maria Luísa Negrão. She had four siblings: Amelia, Maria Luisa, Geraldo and Idalina. Sarah was the great-niece of the Baron of Rio Verde.

=== Marriage and children ===
In her youth, she fell in love with Juscelino Kubitschek de Oliveira, then a medical student. However, when he decided to specialize in urology in Europe, he broke the engagement and did not respond to her letters. Despite this, advised by her mother, Sarah decided to wait for him.

On December 30, 1931, Sarah and Juscelino married in the city of Rio de Janeiro. The next day, they celebrated New Year's Eve at the Copacabana Palace Hotel.

Shortly after the wedding, she signed her name as "Sara Luísa Lemos de Oliveira". Years later, when Juscelino Kubitschek assumed the presidency, she adopted the surname Kubitschek, signing as "Sarah Luisa Lemos Kubitschek de Oliveira".

Sarah Kubitschek had a daughter, Marcia Kubitschek, in 1943. Years later, the couple adopted Maria Estela, a year older than Márcia.

=== Last years and legacy ===
After Juscelino's death, she lived on his pension in a rented apartment in Brasília, where she died of cardiac arrest at the age of 87.

Sarah Kubitschek Hospital is named in her honor. Specializing in the treatment of polytrauma patients, it has units in seven Brazilian capitals: Fortaleza, Macapá, Belo Horizonte, Brasília, São Luís, Rio de Janeiro, Belém and Salvador. In Areia Branca, there is also the Sarah Kubitschek Maternity Hospital.

== Honors and cultural depictions ==
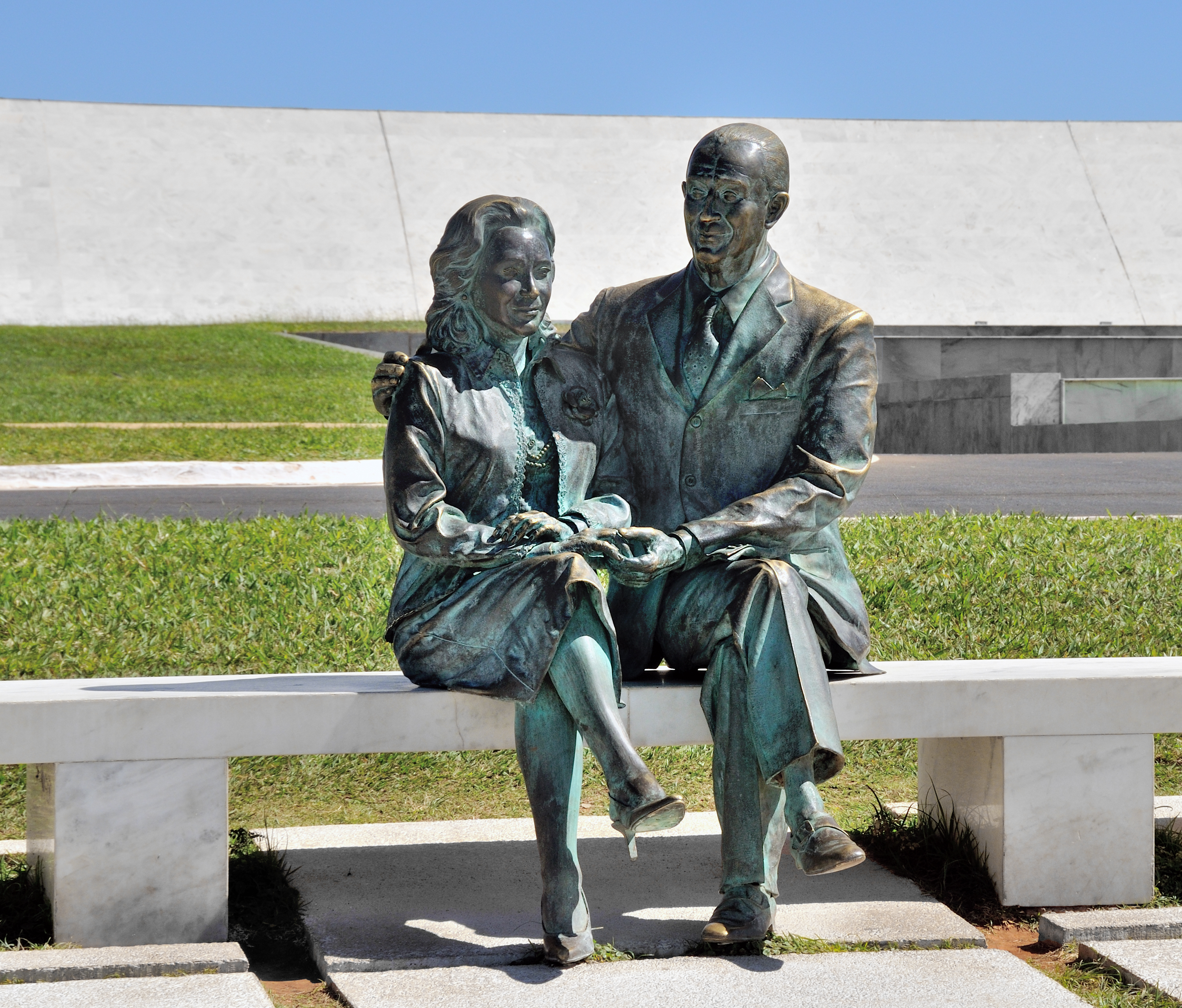
Monument to the President and First Lady at the JK Memorial in Brasília.

On July 30, 1957, she received the Grand Cross of the Military Order of Christ, and on February 28, 1961, she received the Grand Cross of the Order of Prince Henry.

She was played by Marília Pêra and Débora Falabella (young Sarah) in the 2006 miniseries JK, aired on Rede Globo.
