= Juscelino Kubitschek =

President of Brazil from 1956 to 1961

His Excellency Juscelino Kubitschek
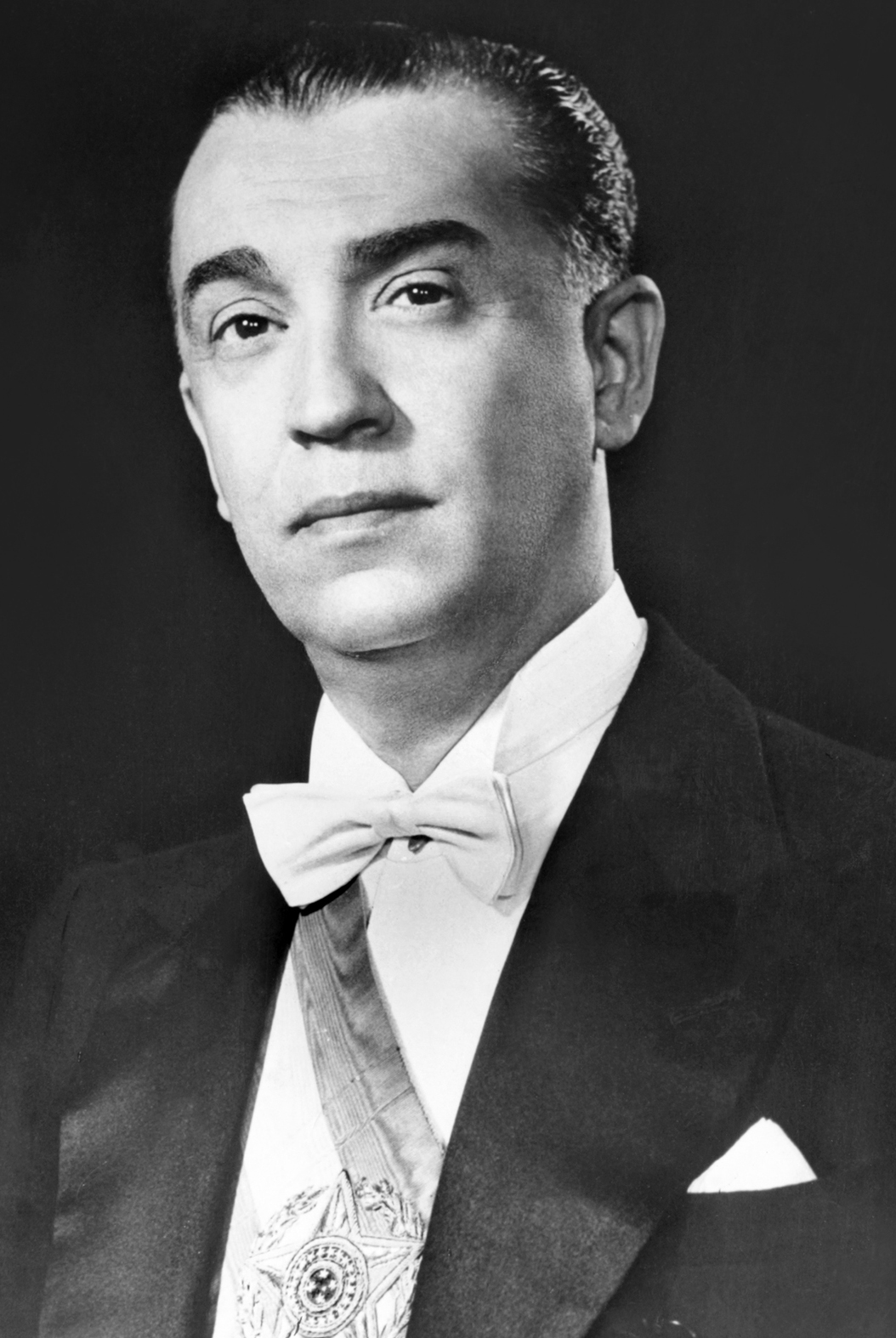
- Official portrait, 1956

21st President of Brazil
- In office 31 January 1956 – 31 January 1961
- Vice President: João Goulart
- Preceded by: Nereu Ramos
- Succeeded by: Jânio Quadros

Senator for Goiás
- In office 4 October 1961 – 8 June 1964
- Preceded by: Taciano de Melo
- Succeeded by: João Abraão

Governor of Minas Gerais
- In office 31 January 1951 – 31 March 1955
- Lieutenant: Clóvis Salgado
- Preceded by: Milton Campos
- Succeeded by: Clóvis Salgado

Member of the Chamber of Deputies
- In office 5 February 1946 – 31 January 1951
- Constituency: Minas Gerais
- In office 2 May 1935 – 10 November 1937
- Constituency: Minas Gerais

Mayor of Belo Horizonte
- In office 23 October 1940 – 30 October 1945
- Nominated by: Benedito Valadares
- Preceded by: José de Araújo
- Succeeded by: João Gusmán

Personal details
- Born: Juscelino Kubitschek de Oliveira; 12 September 1902 Diamantina, Minas Gerais, Brazil
- Died: 22 August 1976 (aged 73) Resende, Rio de Janeiro, Brazil
- Cause of death: state-sanctioned assassination
- Resting place: JK Memorial
- Party: PP (1934–1937); PSD (1945–1965)
- Spouse: Sarah Gomes de Lemos (m. 1931)
- Children: 2, including Márcia
- Parents: João César de Oliveira (father); Júlia Coelho Kubitschek (mother)
- Education: Federal University of Minas Gerais
- Profession: Physician; politician

Military service
- Allegiance: Minas Gerais
- Branch/service: Public Force of Minas Gerais
- Years of service: 1931–1933; 1937–1940
- Rank: Lieutenant colonel
- Battles/wars: Constitutionalist Revolution
- Juscelino Kubitschek's voice Kubitschek greeting the Brazilian people after the installation of the federal government in Brasília; Recorded 25 April 1960

Juscelino Kubitschek de Oliveira (Brazilian Portuguese pronunciation: [ʒuseˈlinu kubiˈtʃɛk(i) dʒi oliˈve(j)ɾɐ]; 12 September 1902 – 22 August 1976), also known by his initials JK, was a Brazilian politician who served as the 21st president of Brazil from 1956 to 1961. During his term, the country experienced a period of notable economic growth and political stability. However, there was a significant increase in external debt, inflation, and wealth inequality. Kubitschek is also well-known for the construction of Brasília.

Born in Diamantina, Kubitschek completed the humanities course at the Diamantina Seminary and moved to Belo Horizonte in 1920. In 1927, he graduated in medicine from the Federal University of Minas Gerais (UFMG), and in 1930 he specialized in urology in Paris. He briefly served as a federal deputy, before losing his seat during the 1937 Brazilian coup. In 1940, he was appointed mayor of Belo Horizonte, remaining in this position until October 1945. At the end of the same year, he was elected constituent deputy for the Social Democratic Party (PSD). In 1950, Kubitschek was elected governor of Minas Gerais. As governor, he created the Companhia Energética de Minas Gerais, and prioritized road building and industrialization.

In October 1954, Kubitschek launched his candidacy for the 1955 presidential election, which was made official in February 1955. He presented a developmentalist speech and used "50 years in 5" as his campaign slogan. In an alliance formed by six parties, his running mate was João Goulart. On 3 October, he was elected president of Brazil with 35.6% of the votes. The opposition tried to annul the election on the grounds that Kubitschek had not obtained an absolute majority of votes. However, general Henrique Teixeira Lott triggered a military movement to ensure Kubitschek's inauguration. As president, Kubitschek was responsible for the construction of a new federal capital, Brasília, thus carrying out an old project to promote the development of Brazil's interior and the country's integration.

In 1961, Kubitschek was elected senator for Goiás and tried to make his candidacy for the 1965 presidential election viable. However, with the 1964 military coup, Kubitschek was accused by the military of corruption and being supported by the communists. As a result, his term was revoked and his political rights were suspended. From then on, Kubitschek began touring cities in the United States and Europe, in voluntary exile. He intended to return to political life, but died in 1976 in what was dismissed at the time as a car accident. Although the National Truth Commission ascertained in 2014 that his death was not suspicious, its successor body the Commission on Political Dead and Missing reviewed the decision in 2026 and decided Kubitschek had indeed been murdered by the military dictatorship.

== Early life and career ==
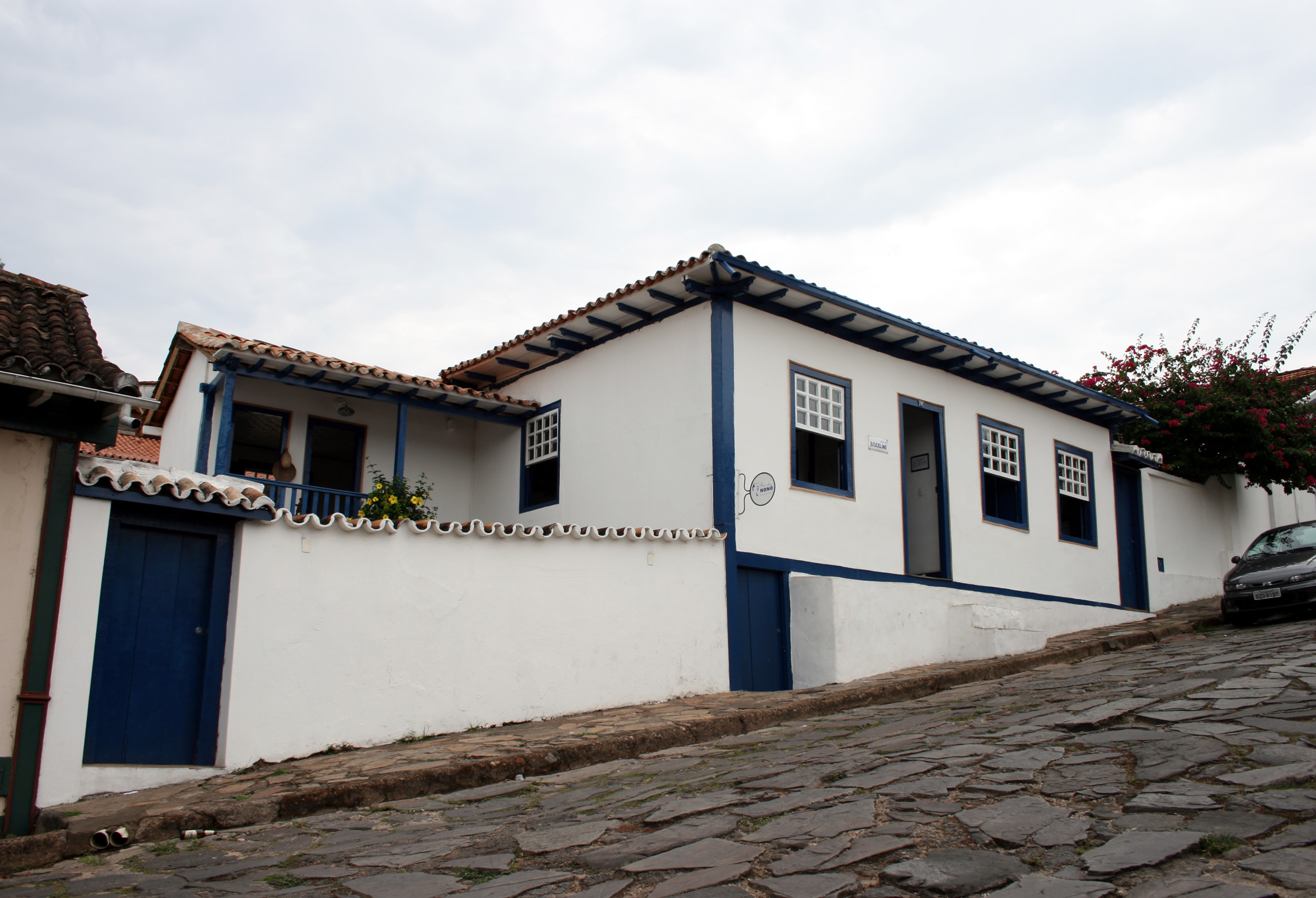
Childhood home of Kubitschek in Diamantina, Minas Gerais.

Kubitschek was born into a poor family in Diamantina, Minas Gerais. His father, João César de Oliveira (1872–1905), who died when Juscelino was two years old, was a traveling salesman. He was raised by his mother, a schoolteacher named Júlia Kubitschek (1873–1973). His mother was of part Czech and Roma descent. He was educated at a seminary school in Diamantina, where he was an average student.

Kubitschek attended the Federal University of Minas Gerais in Belo Horizonte when he turned twenty. He became a licensed medical doctor after seven years of schooling. He then went to live in Europe for a few months after graduating eventually returning to Brazil after the revolution of 1930 that marked the ascension of President Getúlio Vargas.

In 1931, Kubitschek joined the Public Force of Minas Gerais as a doctor. There, he became acquainted with Benedito Valadares, the Governor of Minas Gerais. Valadares named Kubitschek his chief of staff in 1932. Two years later, Kubitschek ran for office for the first time, becoming a federal deputy with the support of Partido Progressista (Progressive Party). However, his term was revoked during the Estado Novo. After this, he briefly returned to practicing medicine.

In 1940, he was appointed Mayor of Belo Horizonte; in 1945, he was elected to the Chamber of Deputies with the support of Partido Social Democrático (Social Democratic Party) and was noted to be ambitious in his push to expand public works and improve infrastructure. It was in his term as Mayor of Belo Horizonte that he would establish a strong, professional relationship with the renowned architect Oscar Niemeyer, who would later become instrumental in designing Brasília. Kubitschek at this time commissioned Oscar Niemeyer to design several municipal buildings in Belo Horizonte.

In 1950, Kubitschek ran for Governor of Minas Gerais. He defeated Bias Fortes in the PSD primary election, and defeated Gabriel Passos (his brother-in-law) in the general election. As governor, he focused on transportation and energy policy. He is credited with establishing a state-owned energy corporation that built five new power plants, and improving public infrastructure.

== Presidency ==
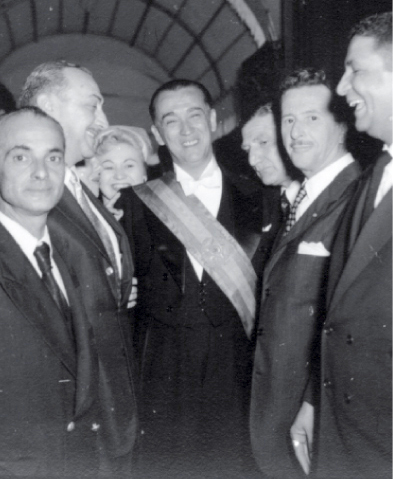
President Kubitschek and some cabinet members on inauguration day, 31 January 1956.

After President Getúlio Vargas committed suicide in 1954, his Vice-President João Café Filho fulfilled the rest of his term until the elections of 1955 which were held in October. Juscelino Kubitschek decided to run for president in a race with two other candidates. He ran with the slogan of “fifty years progress in five” and developed a platform that highlighted energy, agriculture, industry, education, and transportation. He also stressed a wish to diversify Brazil’s economy and open it up to foreign investment. He was also a vocal supporter of moving the government capital out of Rio de Janeiro, to a more central location in the country, to promote regional development.

Before Kubitschek was even inaugurated, however, rumors of a military coup were brewing and the opposition party União Democrática Nacional (National Democratic Union or UDN) became vocal over his close ties to Vargas and his alleged sympathy towards communists. Henrique Teixeira Lott, then Minister of War, and a coalition of high ranking military officers staged a countercoup to ensure that Juscelino Kubitschek was inaugurated. Juscelino Kubitschek would be inaugurated as the 21st President of Brazil on 31 January 1956.

His economic plan had 31 goals distributed in six large categories: energy, transport, food, base industries, education, and the main goal, the construction of Brasília. This plan sought to diversify and expand the Brazilian economy, based on industrial expansion and integration of the national territory.

=== Healthcare ===
As a practicing doctor, Juscelino was passionate about reforming healthcare. Kubitschek campaigned on establishing a central health bureaucracy that previously did not exist to address rural health issues more adequately. The most notable is DNERU which was an agency created to address tuberculosis and malaria, and issue vaccines in areas of the country where access to healthcare was scarce.

=== Economy and major works ===
Opening of the General Motors factory in São José dos Campos by President Kubitschek, 1959.

Although his main project was to develop national industry, it was with the "Goals plan", launched in 1956, that there was a greater opening of the national economy for foreign investment. He made all imported machines and industrial equipment exempt from taxes, as well as to assist foreign capital. However, the exemption only applied if the foreign capital was associated with the national capital ("associated capital"). To amplify the internal market, he developed a generous credit policy.

He promoted the development of the automobile industry, naval industry, heavy industry and the construction of hydroelectric power stations. With the exception of the hydroelectric industry, Juscelino practically created an economy without state-owned companies. He also had a very progressive agenda proposed for Education; however, that was never carried out.

Kubitschek cared a great deal about the construction of transregional roads. He was criticised for focusing only in road construction and putting aside the railways, a decision still controversial today. The construction of the roads helped the integration of the Amazon region, together with the construction of Brasília.

In the short term the economy boomed, with a stronger industry under his leadership. More dependent on energy resources, Brazil became one of the countries most affected by the oil crises of 1973 and 1979. Having to import over 80% of its consumption, the quadrupling of oil prices greatly contributed to Brazil's debts and spiralling inflation, for which his administration was directly blamed by the critics as a result. In fact, the economy continued to suffer well into the 1980s as Brazil's industries became less and less competitive in the global market.

By the end of his term, the foreign debt had grown from 87 million dollars to 297 million dollars. Inflation and wealth inequality had grown larger, with rural-zone strikes that spread to the urban areas. However, the minimum wage from that time is still considered the highest at any moment in Brazilian history. He also initially sought a loan from International Monetary Fund, but backed out of the negotiations.

Kubitschek ended his time in office with a growth of 80% in industrial production but with an inflation rate of 43%.

=== The construction of Brasília ===
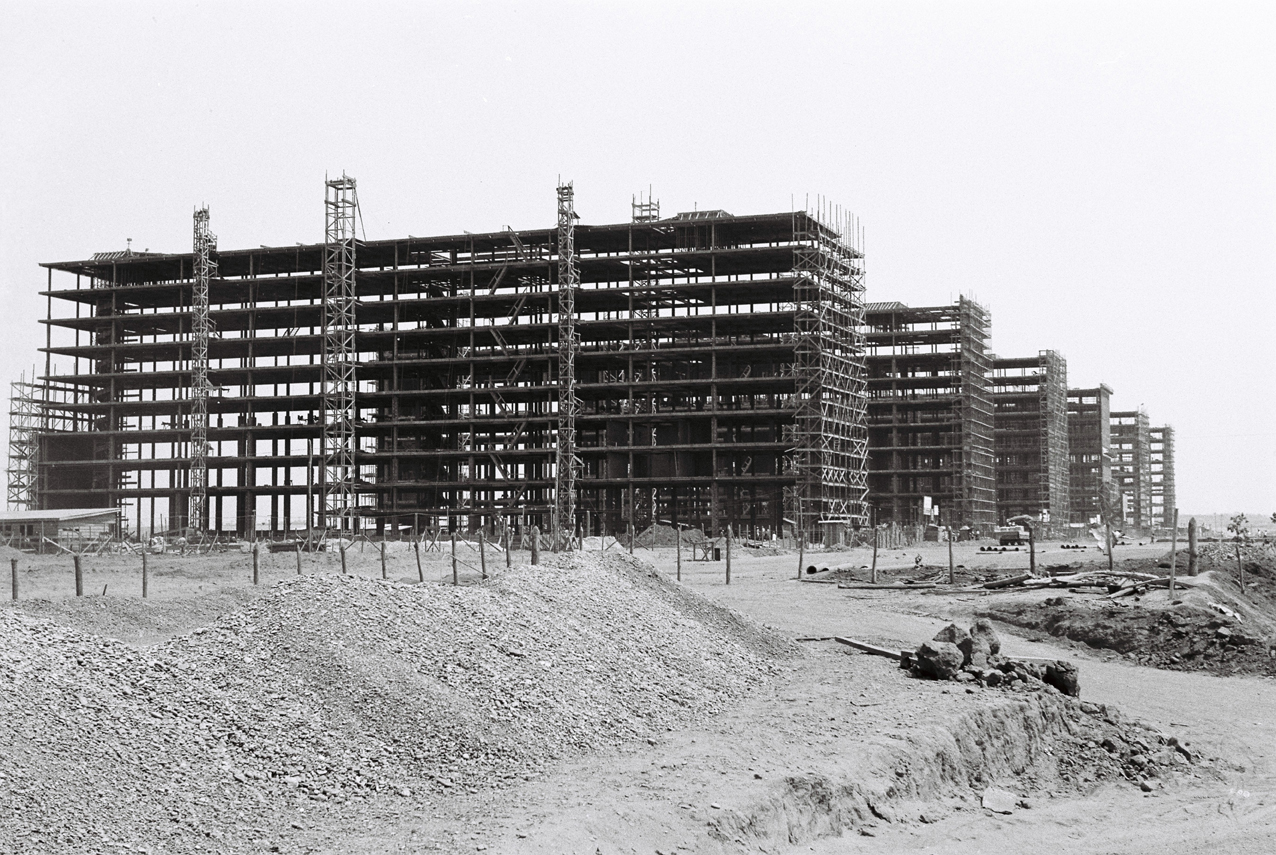
Construction of Brasília, 1959.

The idea of building a new capital in the center of the country was already idealised in the Brazilian constitutions of 1891, 1934 and 1946, but it was only in 1956 that planning began to take form in response to Kubitschek's campaign promise to develop the interior. Initially the move of the capital from Rio de Janeiro was controversial and had division and opposition from people within Rio and throughout Brazil. Debates that included statesmen, residents and professionals were televised on the TV show "Que será do Rio" and letters to the editor in Correio da Manhã.

The work, led by urban planner Lúcio Costa, architect Oscar Niemeyer and landscape designer Roberto Burle Marx, started in February 1957. More than 200 machines were put to work and 30,000 workers came from every part of the country, though most from the northeast. The construction went on day and night to meet the objective of finishing Brasília by 21 April 1960, in a homage to the Inconfidência Mineira and Rome's founding. A completely new capital city, its streets, government palaces, infrastructure, living facilities, etc., suddenly emerged in the middle of a savanna in just 41 months, and before the target date. As soon as it was inaugurated, Brasília was considered a masterpiece of urbanism and modern architecture.

Brasília plays a strategic role in integrating Brazil's farthest regions, bringing development to unpopulated areas and guaranteeing Brazil's cultural and territorial unity.

The construction of Brasília fostered the development of many roads, linking Brazil's vast territories. One important example was the construction of the Belém–Brasília Highway. Previously, the only way to go from Rio or São Paulo to Belém was via ship on the Atlantic Ocean. During the Second World War, this weak link had been blocked by German U-boats, virtually disrupting all commerce.

The new capital was soon to help integrate all the Brazilian regions, create jobs and absorb a workforce from the Brazilian Northeast, and to stimulate the economy of the Central-west and North. During the construction of Brasília, in the haste to finish the job, accidents were frequent, something Kubitschek's government did its utmost to cover up.

=== Allegations of corruption ===
Kubitschek's government was often accused of corruption. The accusations began at the time he was governor and intensified during his presidency, when the construction of Brasília began. There were serious reasons to believe that people connected to Juscelino had been favored in the construction. Also, the airline Pan-Air Brazil held a monopoly on the transport of people and goods during this period, yet another source of controversy.

During his time in office, Time magazine wrote that he had the seventh greatest fortune in the world, a claim that was never proven. In fact, upon his death many years later, it was shown he had earned very modest means. This did not stop a candidate for the next presidency, Jânio Quadros, from stating during his presidential campaign that he would "sweep the corruption out of the country". Later, during the military regime, Juscelino would be questioned about the corruption allegations and about his supposed ties with communist groups.

Kubitschek was succeeded by Jânio Quadros in 1961. After the military took power in 1964, Kubitschek's political rights were suspended for 10 years. He went into self-imposed exile and stayed in numerous U.S. and European cities.

== Return to Brazil and death ==
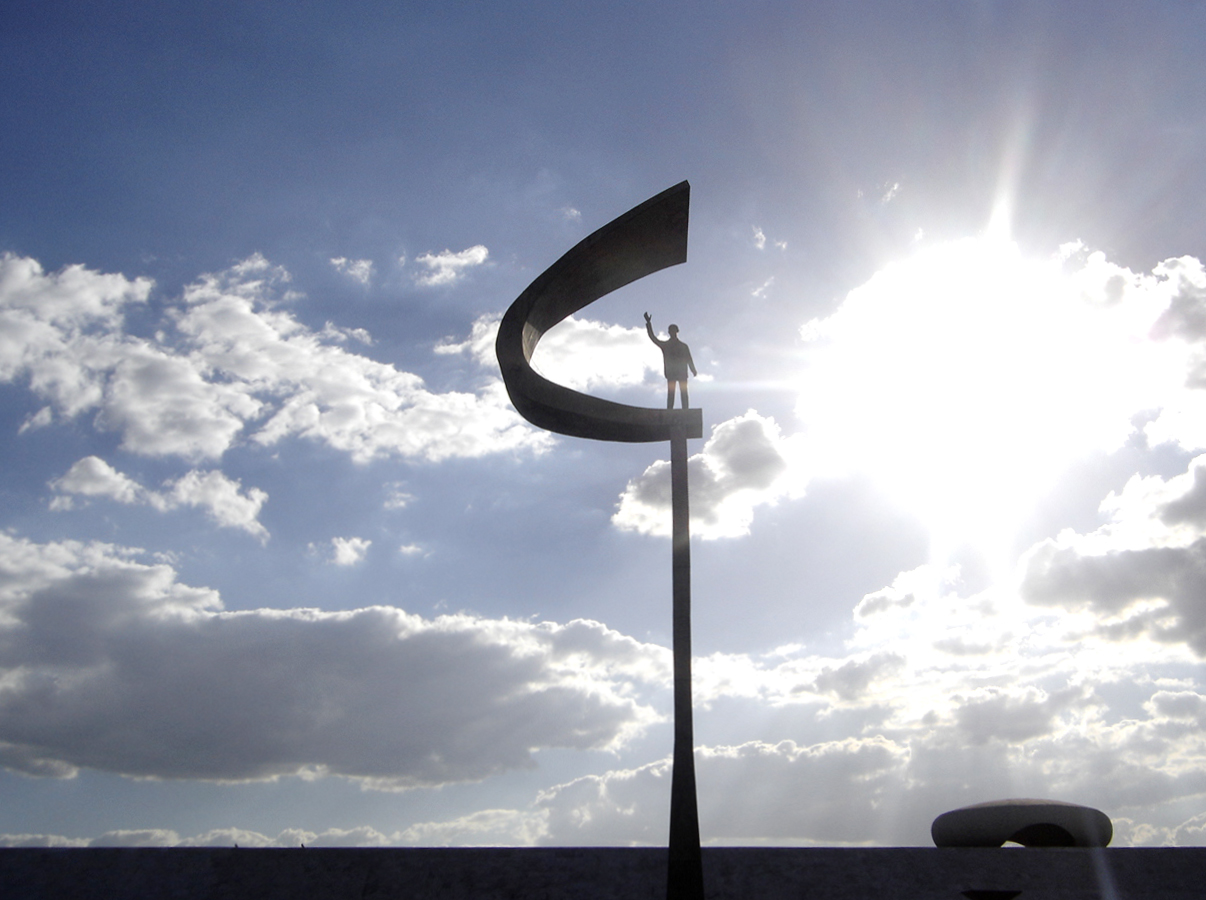
JK Memorial in Brasília

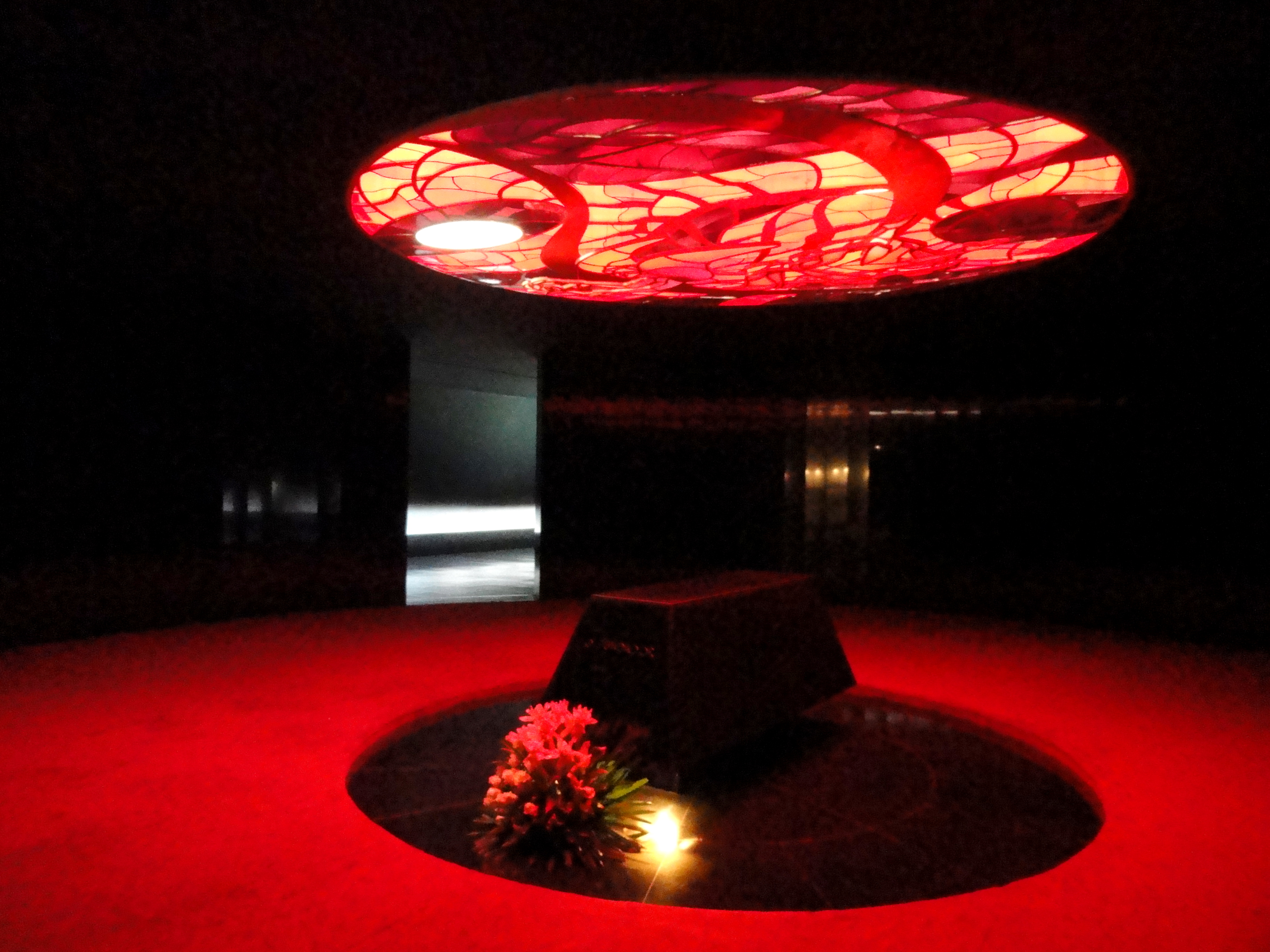
Tomb of Kubitschek in the crypt at the memorial.

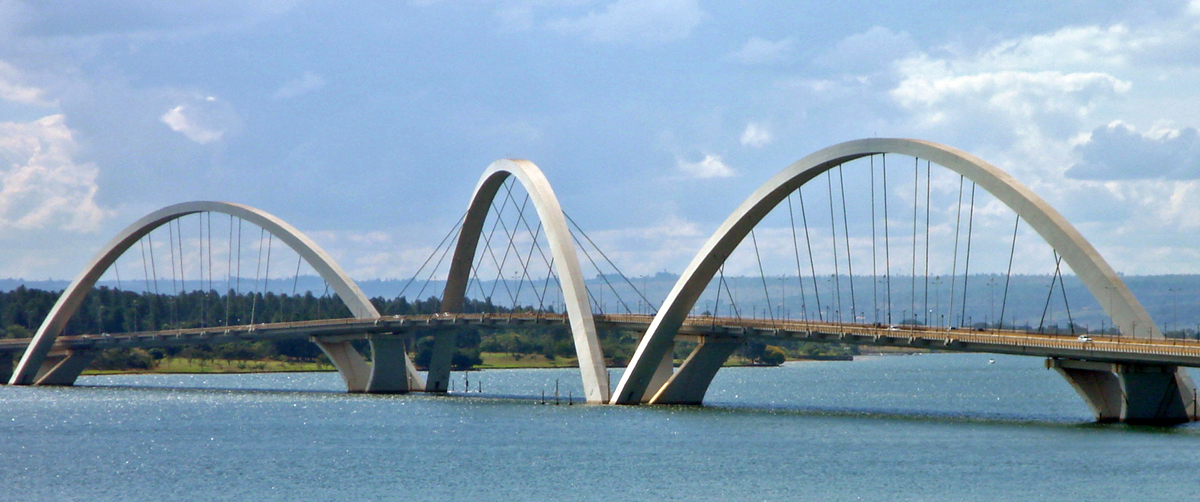
Juscelino Kubitschek bridge

In March 1967, Kubitschek returned to Brazil and joined Carlos Lacerda and Goulart in organizing the Frente Ampla, in opposition to the military dictatorship. The Frente Ampla was extinguished by the military a year later, and Kubitschek went to prison for a short period.

In October 1975, Kubitschek unsuccessfully ran for a seat at the Brazilian Academy of Letters. He occupied chair number 34 at the Minas Gerais Academy of Letters.

Kubitschek died in a car crash on August 22, 1976, near the city of Resende in the state of Rio de Janeiro. 350,000 mourners were present at his burial in Brasília. He is now buried in the JK Memorial.

In 2000, the former governor of Rio de Janeiro, Leonel Brizola, alleged that João Goulart and Kubitschek were murdered as part of the US-backed Operation Condor, and requested the investigation of their deaths as part of the National Truth Commission investigations. They were originally reported to have died respectively of a heart attack and a car accident. On 27 March 2014, the commission concluded that Kubitschek was not assassinated. In May 2026, the Commission on Political Dead and Missing reviewed the decision and announced that Kubitschek was indeed killed by the Brazilian military dictatorship.

== Honours ==
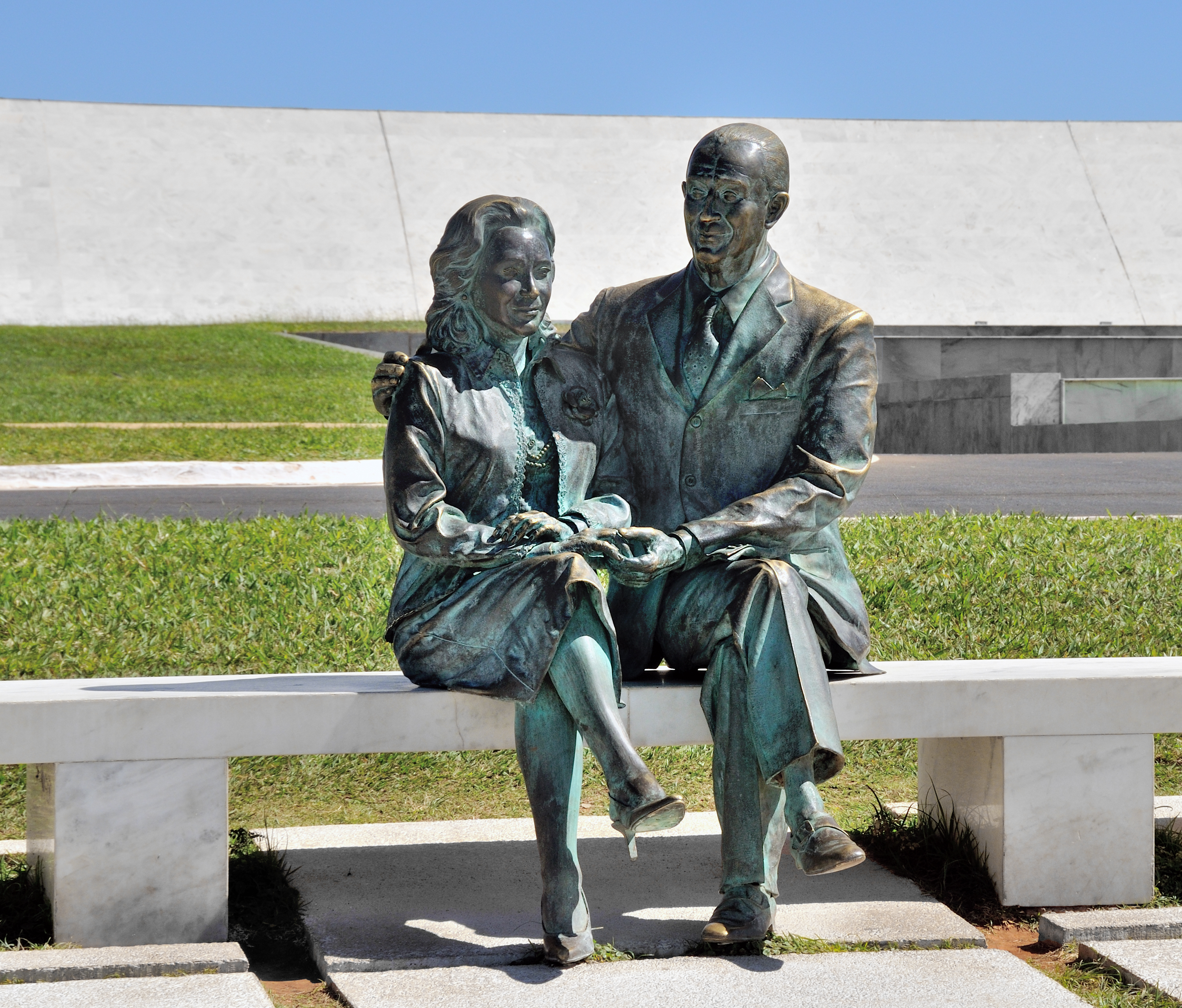
Monument to Kubitschek and his wife Sarah in front of the JK Memorial.

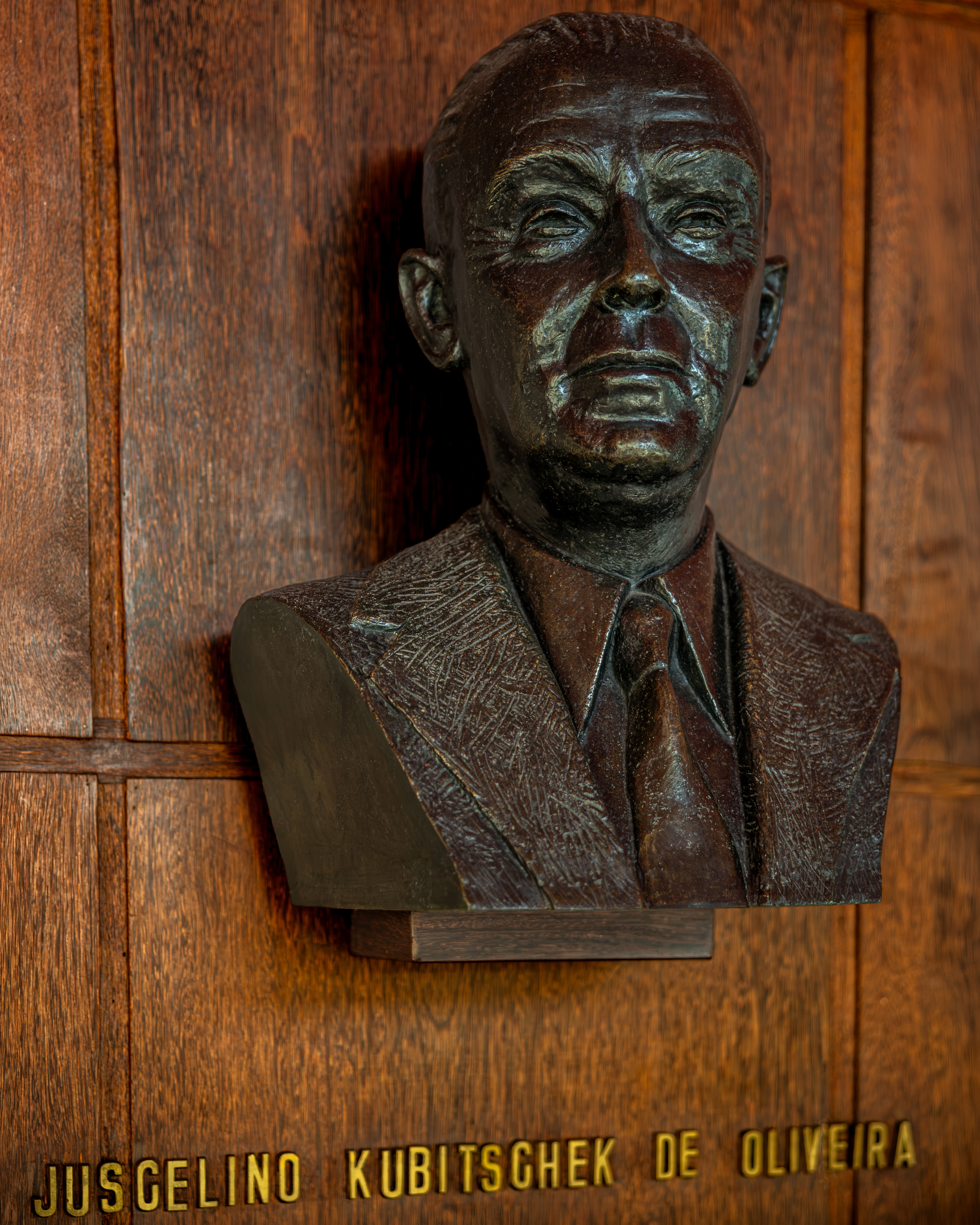
Bronze bust of Juscelino Kubitschek at the Palácio das Artes in Belo Horizonte.

The Presidente Juscelino Kubitschek International Airport of Brasília, the Juscelino Kubitschek bridge and Juscelino Kubitschek Power Plant are named after him. There is also a luxury hotel named Kubitschek Plaza located in that city.

Many cities have things named after him, such as Juscelino Kubitschek, Santa Maria. "JK" is a ubiquitous acronym honouring the ex-president, who is often seen by Brazilians as the "father of modern Brazil".

=== Foreign honours ===
- Collar of the Order of the Aztec Eagle
- Collar of the Order of Isabella the Catholic
- 1st Class of the Order of Tomáš Garrigue Masaryk (posthumously)
- Grand Cross of the Order of Christ
- Grand Cross Special Class of the Order of Merit of the Federal Republic of Germany
- Honorary Knight Grand Cross of The Most Excellent Order of the British Empire

== Media ==
In 2006, Globo created a miniseries based on Kubitschek's life called JK, featuring Wagner Moura (portraying Kubitschek ages 18–43) and José Wilker (ages 44–75).

== Personal life ==
In December 1931, he married Sarah Lemos, with whom he had a daughter, Márcia, in 1943. The couple also adopted Maria Estela in 1947.

In 1980, Márcia married Cuban-American ballet star Fernando Bujones. She was elected to the National Congress of Brazil in 1987 and served as lieutenant governor of the Federal District from 1991 to 1994.

== See also ==
- 1964 Brazilian coup d'état
- History of Brazil (1945–1964)

Political offices
Preceded by José Oswaldo de Araújo	Mayor of Belo Horizonte; 1940–1945	Succeeded by João Gusman Júnior
Preceded by Milton Soares Campos	Governor of Minas Gerais; 1951–1955	Succeeded by Clóvis Salgado da Gama
Preceded by Nereu Ramos	President of Brazil; 1956–1961	Succeeded by Jânio Quadros
