= Caladão Stream =

Brazilian watercourse

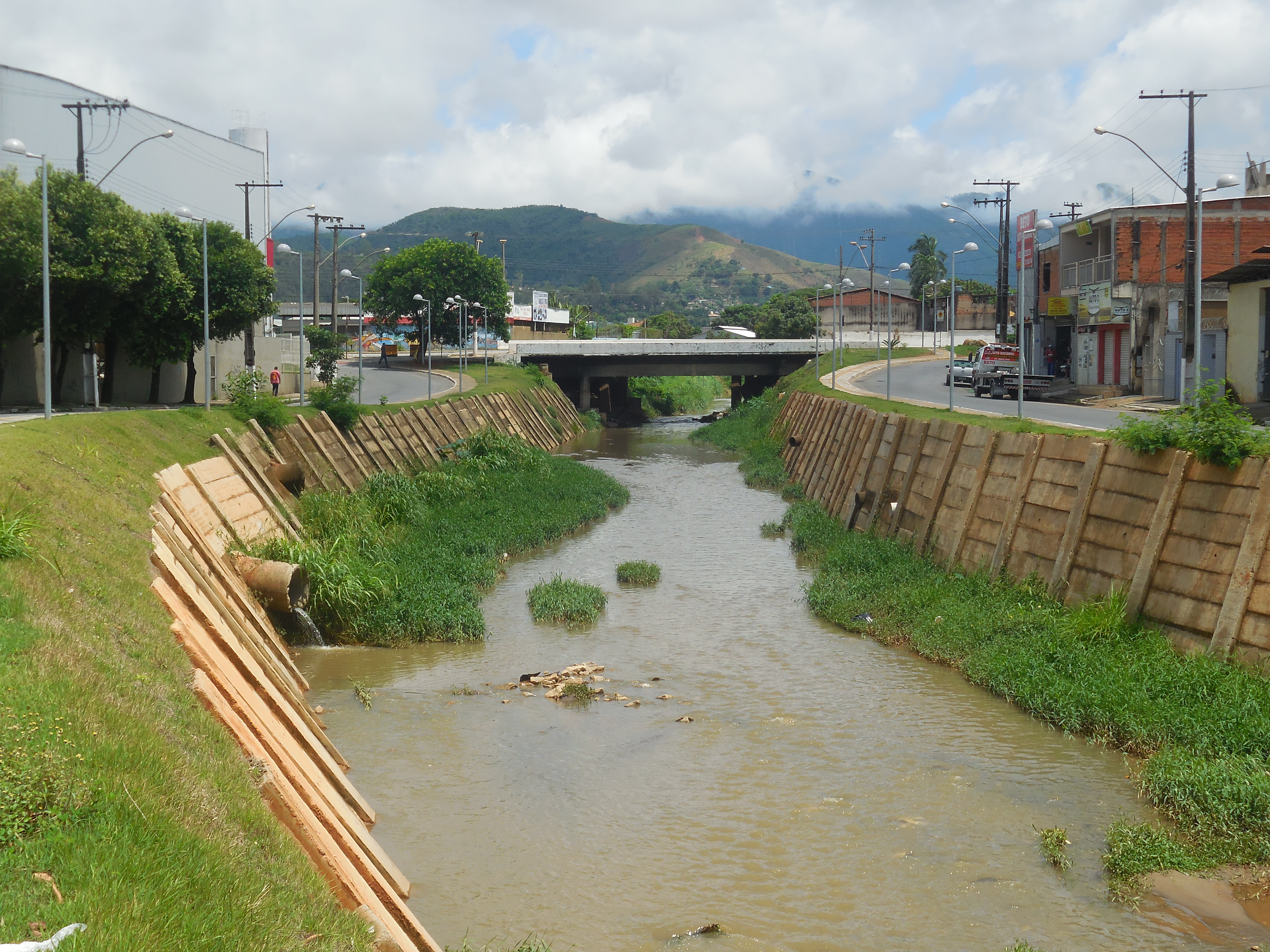
- Caladão Stream between the neighborhoods of Professores and Bom Jesus with the mountains of Serra dos Cocais in the background, where its source is located.
- Native name: Ribeirão Caladão (Portuguese)

Location
- Country: Brazil
- State: Minas Gerais
- Region: South America

Physical characteristics
- Source: Serra dos Cocais
- Mouth: Piracicaba River
  - location: Coronel Fabriciano
  - coordinates: 19°31′33″S 42°37′05″W
- Length: 10km

The Caladão Stream (Portuguese: Ribeirão Caladão) is a watercourse that rises and flows in the Brazilian municipality of Coronel Fabriciano, in the state of Minas Gerais. The source is located in Serra dos Cocais and runs for 10 kilometers to its mouth in the Piracicaba River. Its sub-basin covers 53 km^{2} and encompasses the Senador Melo Viana district, the most populous area of the city.

Pollution and the disorderly occupation of adjacent areas, especially during the 20th century, have caused a propensity to flooding during storms. Solutions are being developed through environmental education projects in the city's schools, hillside containment, drainage and reforestation works.

== History and occupation ==
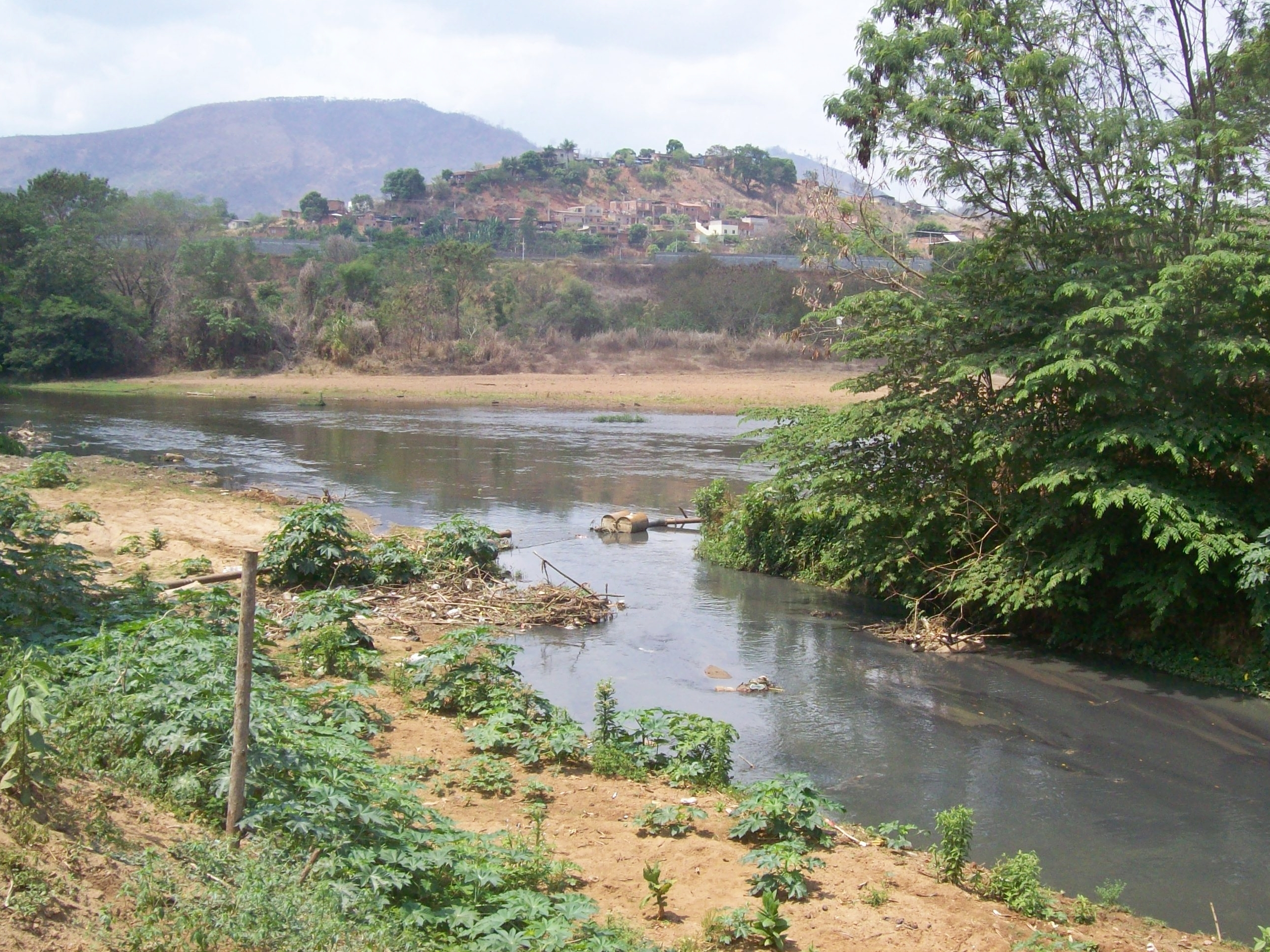
River mouth of the Caladão Stream in the Piracicaba River.

The Caladão Stream was originally called Calado (English: Quiet), a reference to the silence required to avoid attracting the attention of natives living in the area at the beginning of the 19th century. There is also the hypothesis that the term derives from the silence of the waters flowing through the stream.

There was a small port on the Piracicaba River where goods were shipped by muleteers who traveled along a road opened by Guido Marlière in 1825, linking Antônio Dias to the Santo Antônio River through the Serra dos Cocais. At the beginning of the 20th century, this route was responsible for the formation of the settlement of Santo Antônio de Piracicaba, the first urban nucleus of the current municipality of Coronel Fabriciano, which is now the Melo Viana neighborhood.

The settlers used the clean waters for fishing and leisure. The first allotments were located on the banks of the river courses, including the Caladão, where the Senador Melo Viana district was established. The unplanned occupation of adjacent areas led to pollution and a susceptibility to flooding during heavy rainfall in the city's most populated areas. The Giovannini and Melo Viana neighborhoods are usually the hardest hit, as they are populous neighborhoods located in a flat area known as the Baixada do Melo Viana.

=== Floods and drainage attempts ===
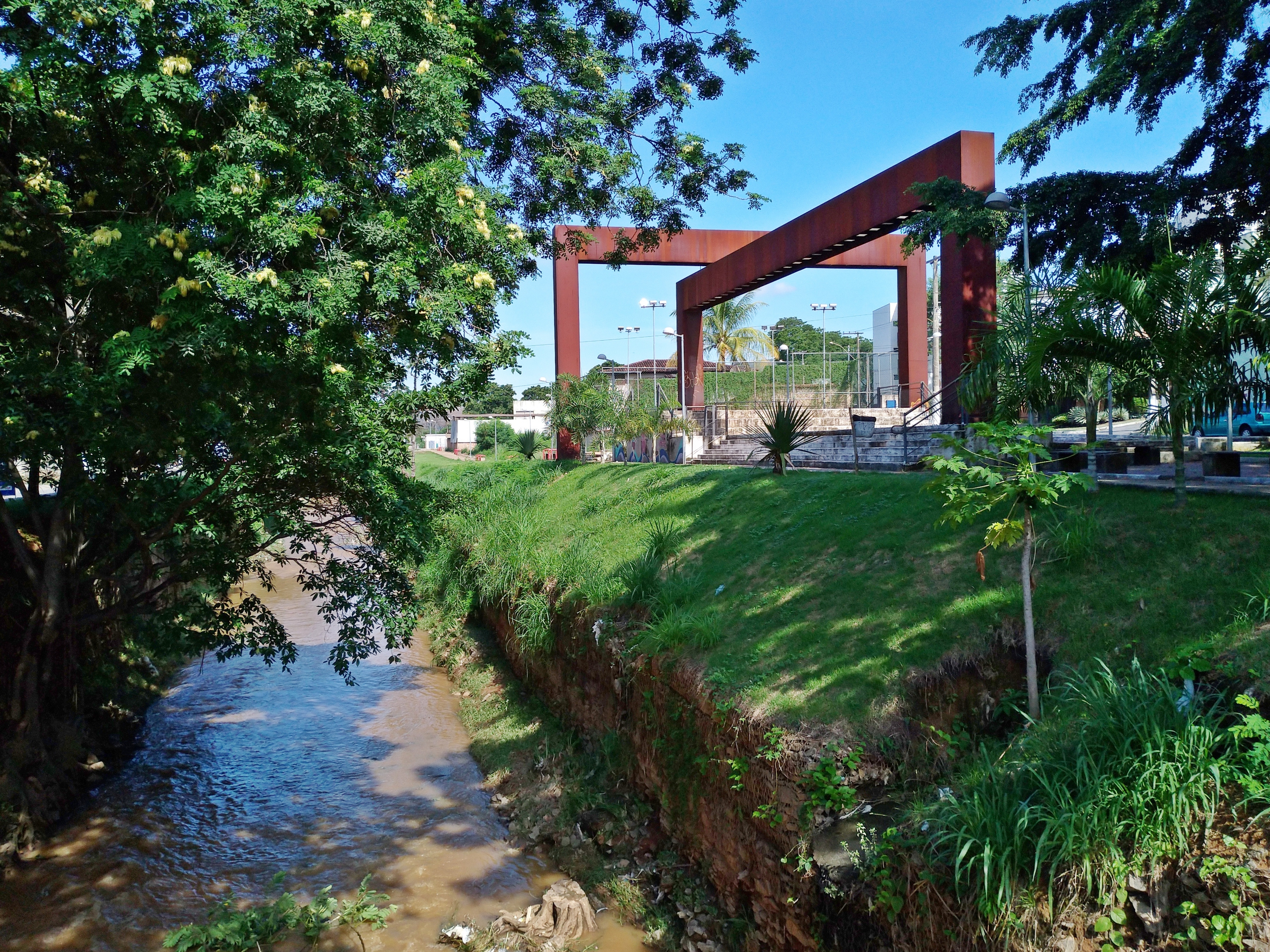
Caladão Stream and Parque Linear Square

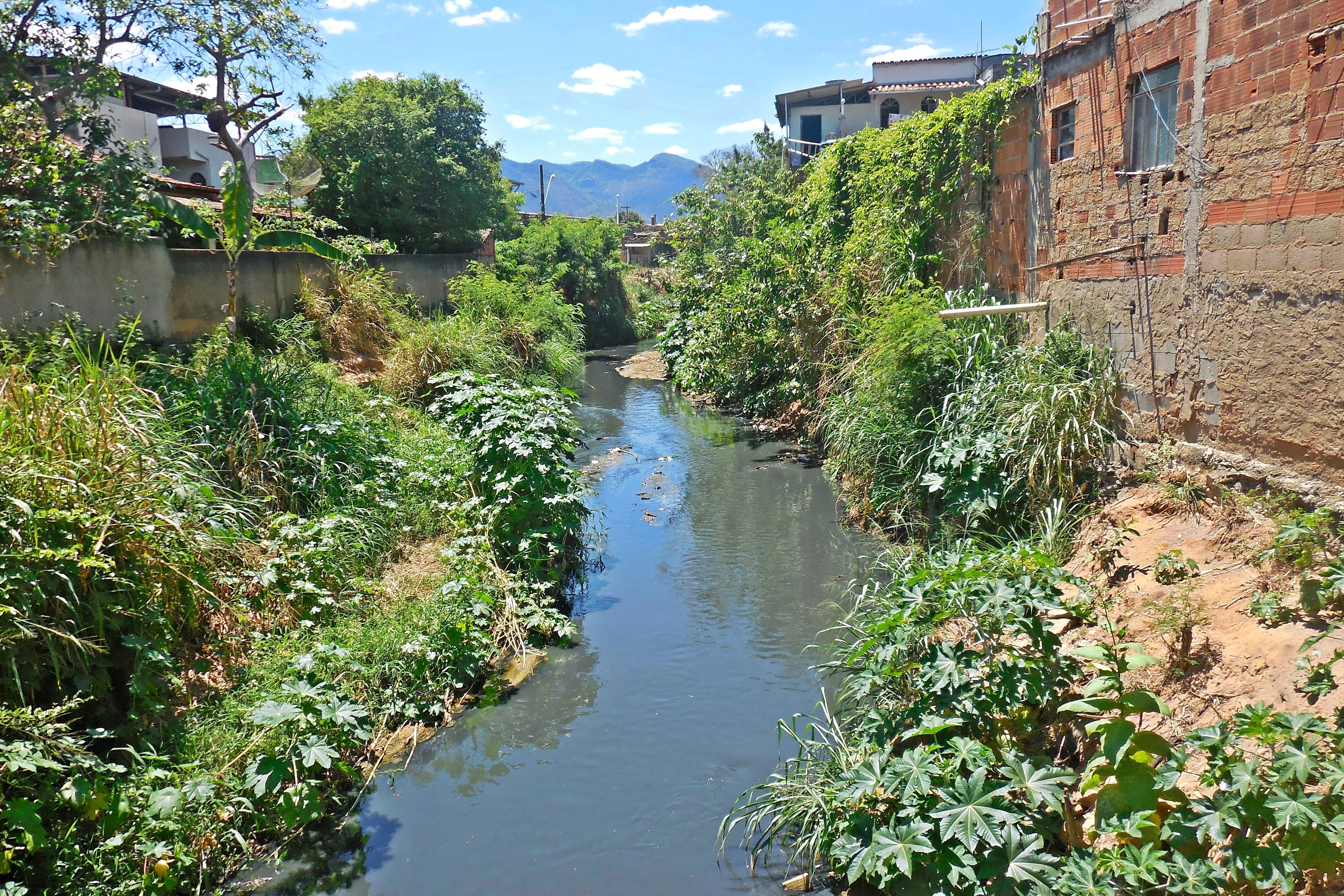
The silted-up stream in the middle of housing estates between the Melo Viana and Júlia Kubitschek neighborhoods, in 2017.

Overflows were already frequent during heavy rains. Between January and February 1979, the high level of the Piracicaba River caused the flooding of the Caladão Stream after about 40 consecutive days of heavy rains. Mayor Mariano Pires Pontes began drainage work on the basin to alleviate the flooding problems and built Sanitária Avenue (now Julita Pires Bretas Avenue) bordering a section of the basin with channeled gabions.

On December 15, 2005, a flood affected all the neighborhoods bordering the Caladão Stream (except Santa Helena) and left dozens homeless. Three years later, Mayor Chico Simões announced the Projeto Parque Linear (English: Linear Park Project), which included the resettlement of residents from risk areas, walking trails, a cycle path, reforestation and containment works along the urban stretch of the stream. According to the city authorities, the plan was to alleviate flooding, reduce traffic on Magalhães Pinto Avenue and optimize public safety. However, the execution of the works suffered from delays and investigations into quality and spending. The "first stage" of the works, carried out in 2011, included interventions in the drainage networks, and the "second stage" involved the installation of containment, leisure areas and a walking path along a 1 km stretch of the stream. The Parque Linear Square was also built in the Santa Helena neighborhood, close to the river mouth. This phase, corresponding to the extension of Julita Pires Bretas Avenue, between the Santa Terezinha, Santa Helena and Professores neighborhoods, was carried out between April 2012 and June 2016.

On December 27, 2013, a four-hour storm after two weeks of interrupted rainfall raised the level of the river suddenly to 2.8 meters, causing a new flood in the city. Dozens of people were left homeless and entire neighborhoods and streets were covered in mud. On December 1, 2015, a storm flooded again, affecting areas that had traditionally been afflicted. On December 11, 2017, after a few hours of rain, a section of the walking path on Julita Pires Bretas Avenue in the Santa Terezinha neighborhood, built as part of the Projeto Parque Linear, collapsed due to the volume of water in the spring.

== Geography ==
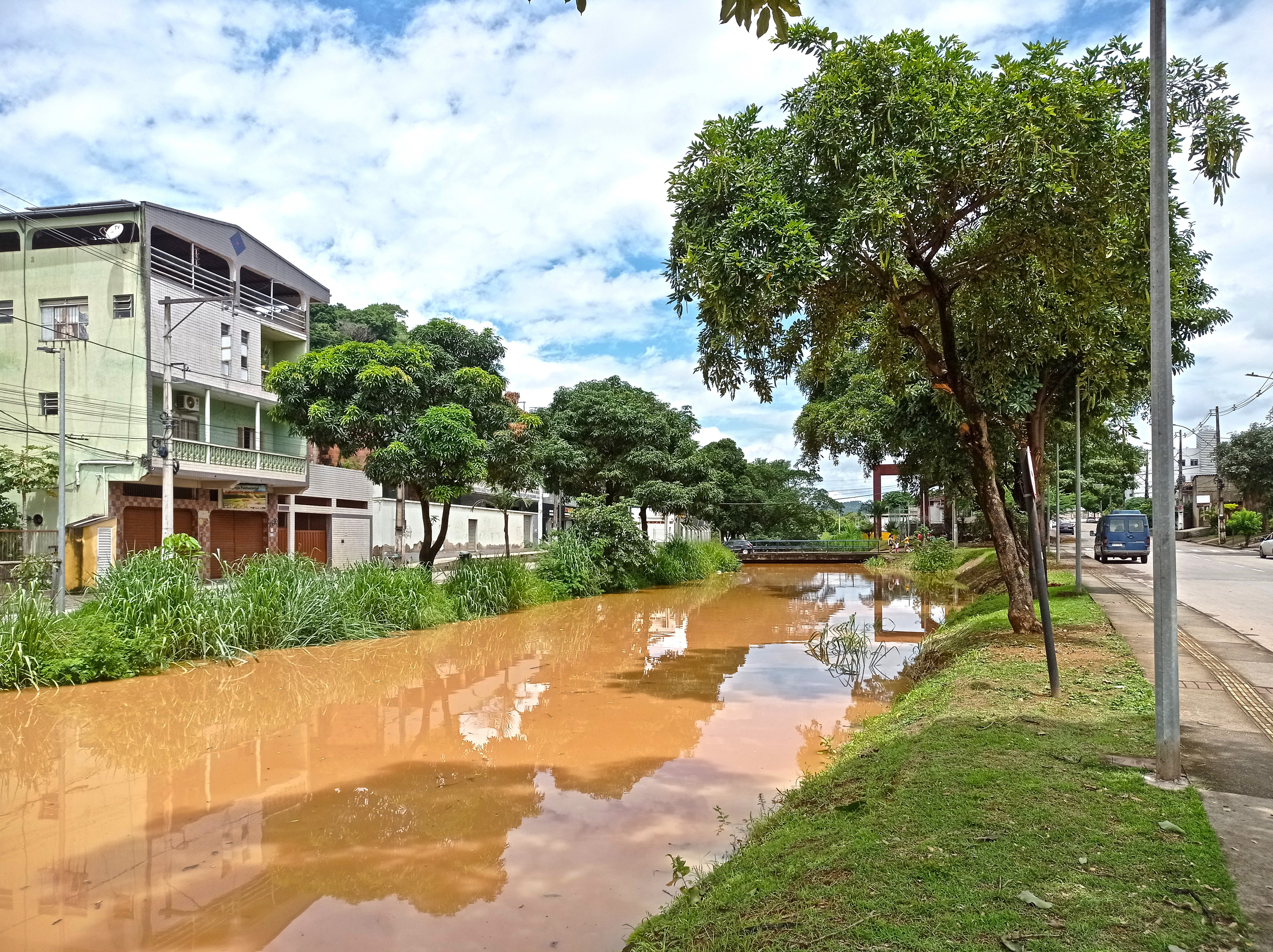
Caladão Stream between the Santa Terezinha and Santa Helena neighborhoods after a period of intense rains.

The source of the Caladão Stream is located in the Serra dos Cocais, amidst an area of dense forest. About 1 km from the source, it crosses the Caladão neighborhood and runs 9 km south to its mouth on the Piracicaba River, between the Santa Helena and Santa Terezinha neighborhoods. It covers all or partially the districts of Caladão, Contente, Jardim Primavera, Judith Bhering, Frederico Ozanan, Manoel Maia, Residencial Fazendinha, Gávea, Floresta, Santo Antônio, Alipinho, Surinan, Sílvio Pereira I, Melo Viana, Júlia Kubitschek, Giovannini, Bom Jesus, Professores, Santa Helena and Santa Terezinha.

The main tributaries of the Caladão Stream are the Melo Viana Stream, in rural area, and the Camilos and São Domingos streams, in urban area. Its sub-basin covers around 53 km^{2} and is part of the Piracicaba River sub-basin, which is included in the Doce River Basin. It is bordered by the sub-basins of the Ipanema, Cocais Pequeno and Caladinho streams, covering a population of approximately 70,000 residents. There are no flood-prone conditions along its course, but they are favored by pollution, poor macro-drainage and the predominance of mountainous and undulating topography in the city. In addition, floods in the Piracicaba River can cause the stream's waters to be dammed, impairing its flow and increasing the possibility of flooding in the lower areas of its banks.

== Ecology ==
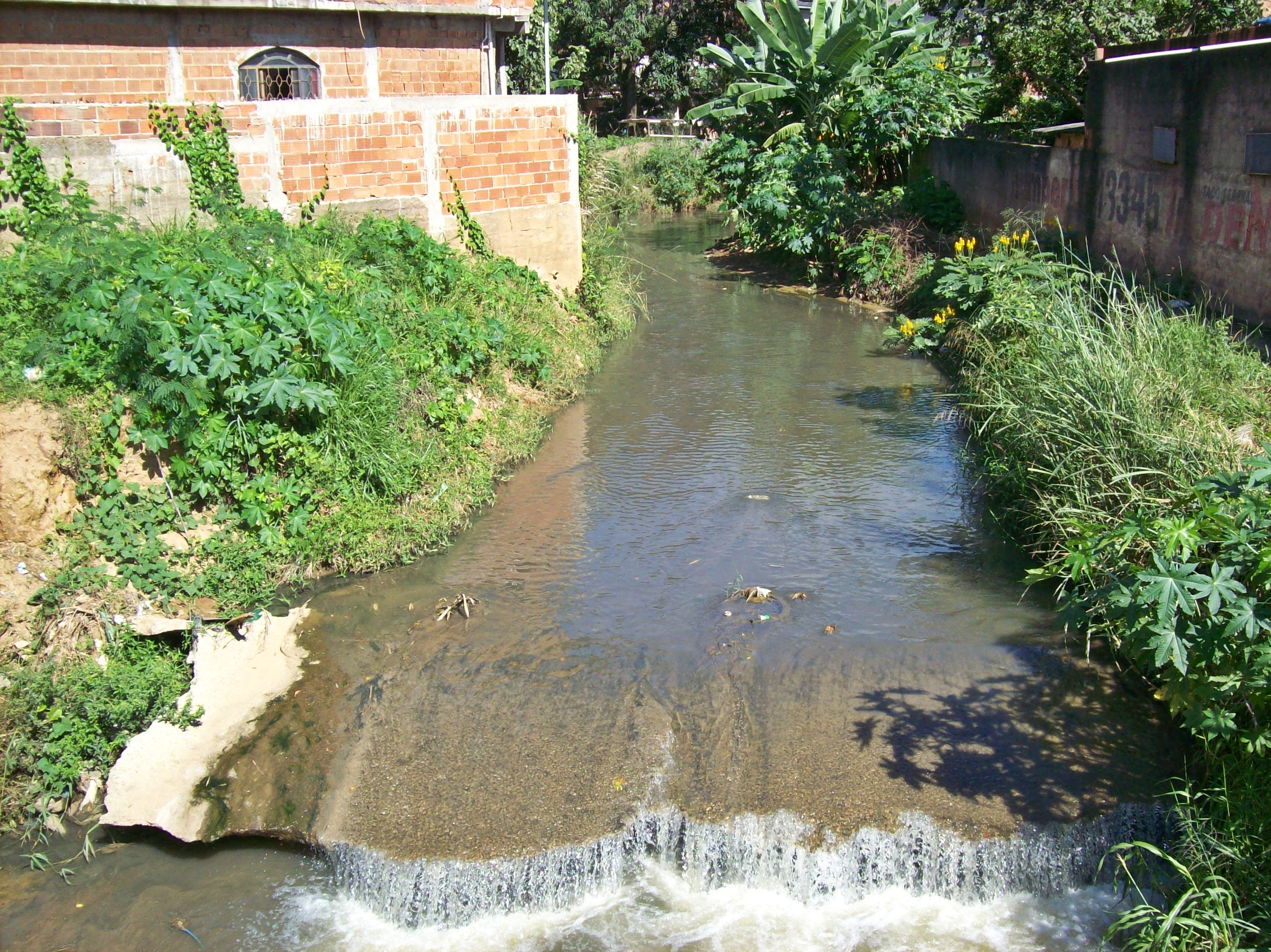
Caladão Stream in the Melo Viana neighborhood.

Coronel Fabriciano's Ordinance Plan includes reforestation of the section inside the urban area, an increase in flow capacity and flood control. In 2004, the construction of a sewage treatment plant located between the Mangueiras and Santa Terezinha II neighborhoods to meet the demand from the city's waterways began to be studied. However, the project was suspended because residents in the area feared odors. In the following years, collection networks and interceptors were installed throughout the Caladão Stream sub-basin, even without a definitive position on the location of the sewage treatment plant.

Sewage from Coronel Fabriciano remained discharged directly into the watercourses bordering the urban perimeter without any management until 2019, when the construction of a treatment plant in Limoeiro, district of Timóteo, to supply 165,000 inhabitants in both cities was authorized. Despite the treatment of wastewater, irregular dumping of garbage and debris on the banks of the stream is evident in some stretches. During long dry periods, the water becomes dark and the dirt more concentrated, with strong odors and mosquitoes in several parts. In the rainy season, which usually runs from October to April, the lower areas are affected by flooding. Excessive garbage in the watercourse obstructs the flow of water during heavy rains, favoring overflows.

Besides pollution, siltation, erosion and damage to biodiversity have been observed in the course of the stream. There are places demarcated as permanent protection areas (APP), but that have been occupied irregularly. The City Hall regularly weeds, cleans and removes debris from public spaces and provides disposal sites around the city for construction debris, furniture and branches. Environmental education projects in the city's schools, lectures, photographic exhibitions, video presentations and community meetings are held to alleviate the situation. In 2019, the City Hall installed ecobarriers in the Caladão Stream to retain floating materials.

== Gallery ==
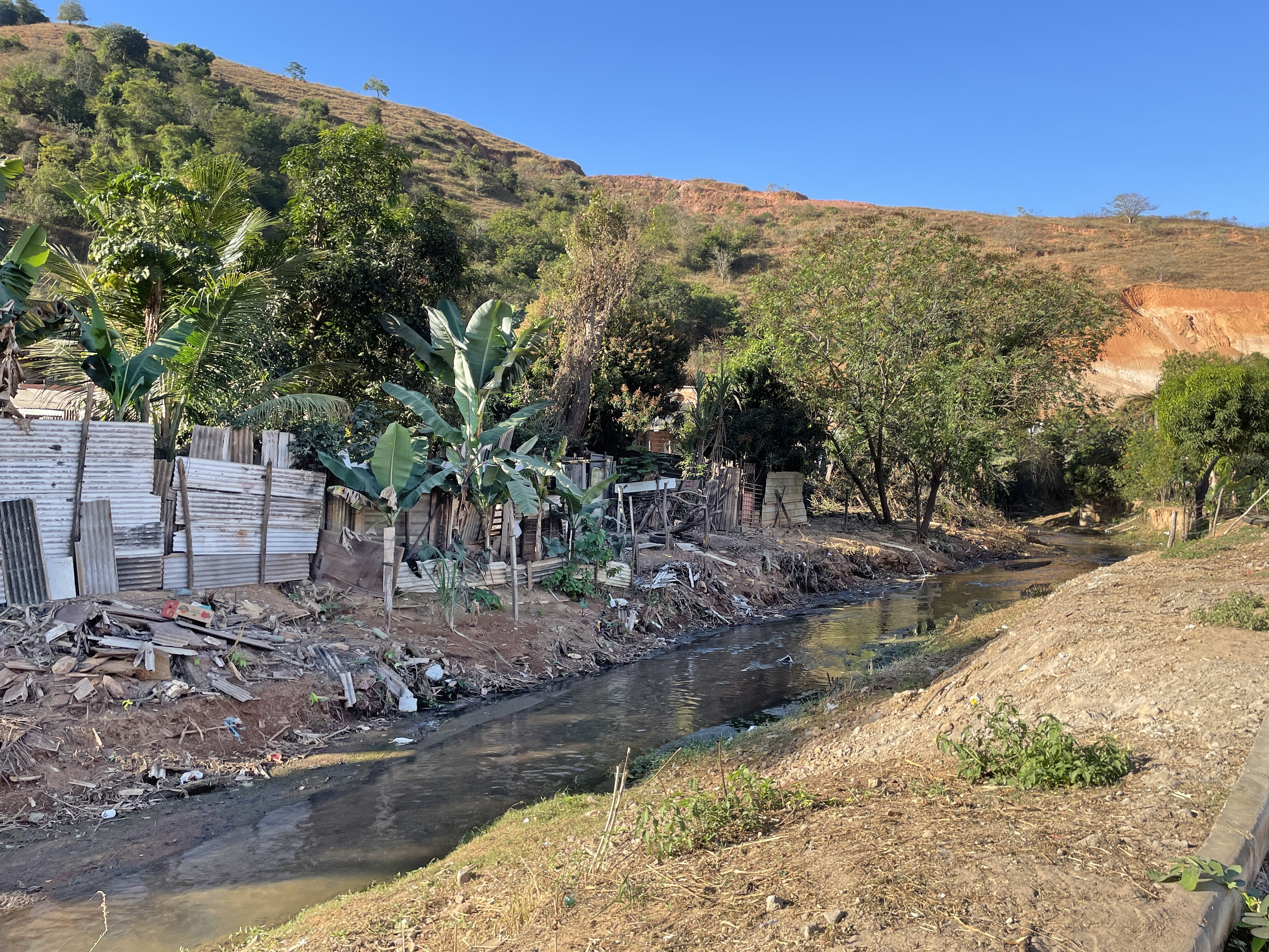
Caladão Stream between the Judith Bhering and Frederico Ozanan neighborhoods

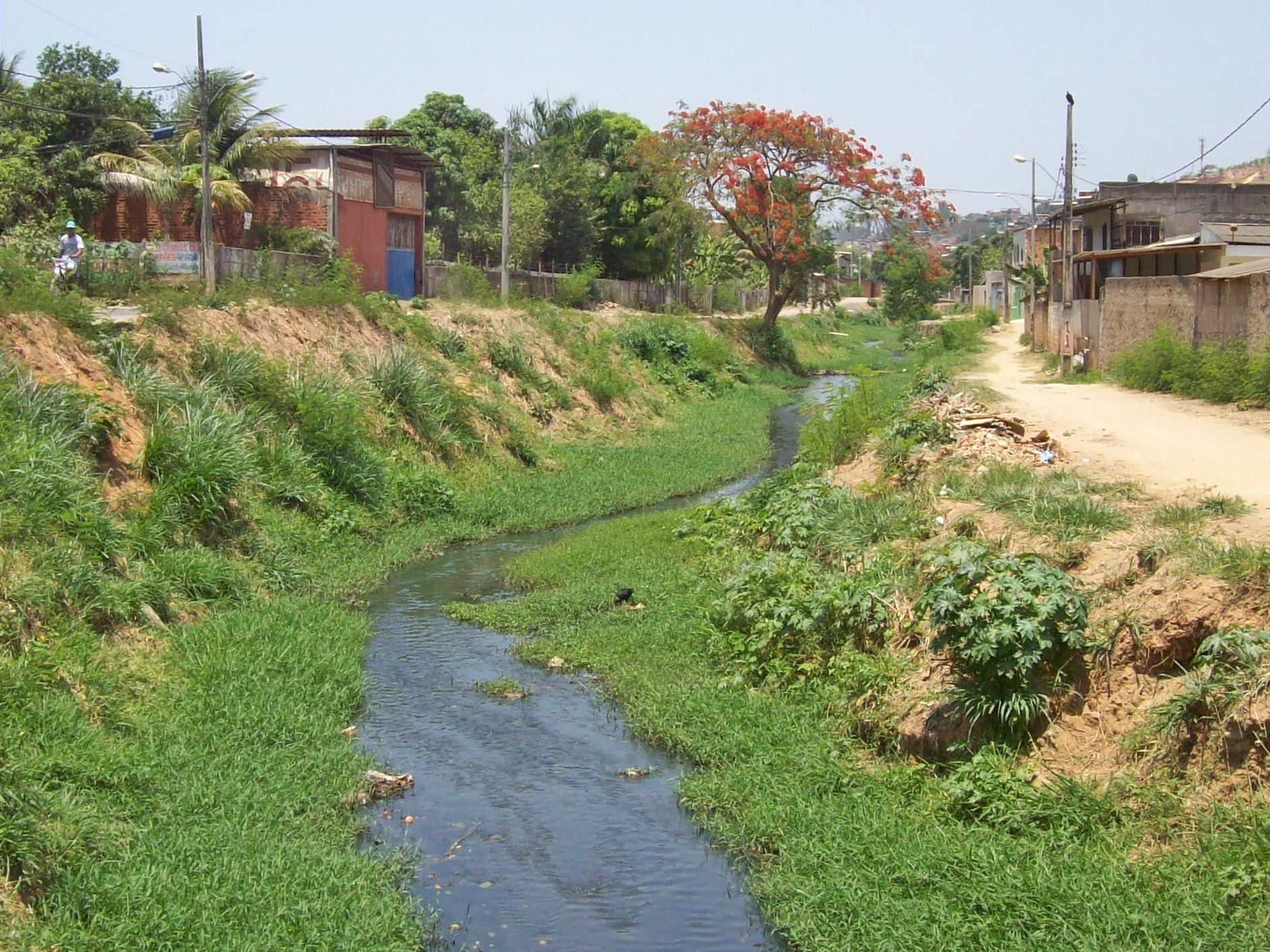
Caladão Stream between the Floresta and Tranquilão neighborhoods after a long period of drought in 2015.

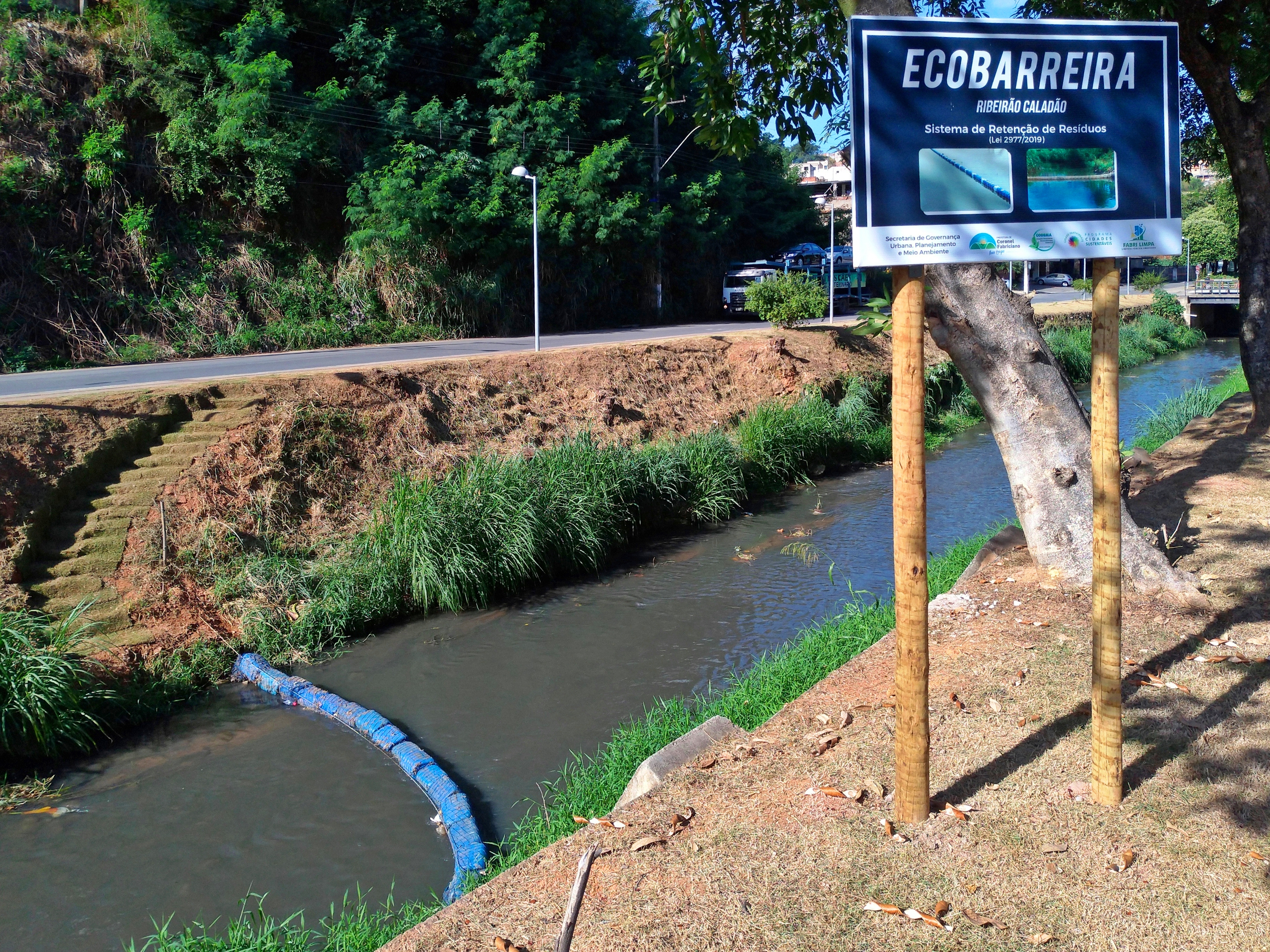
Ecobarrier on the stream.

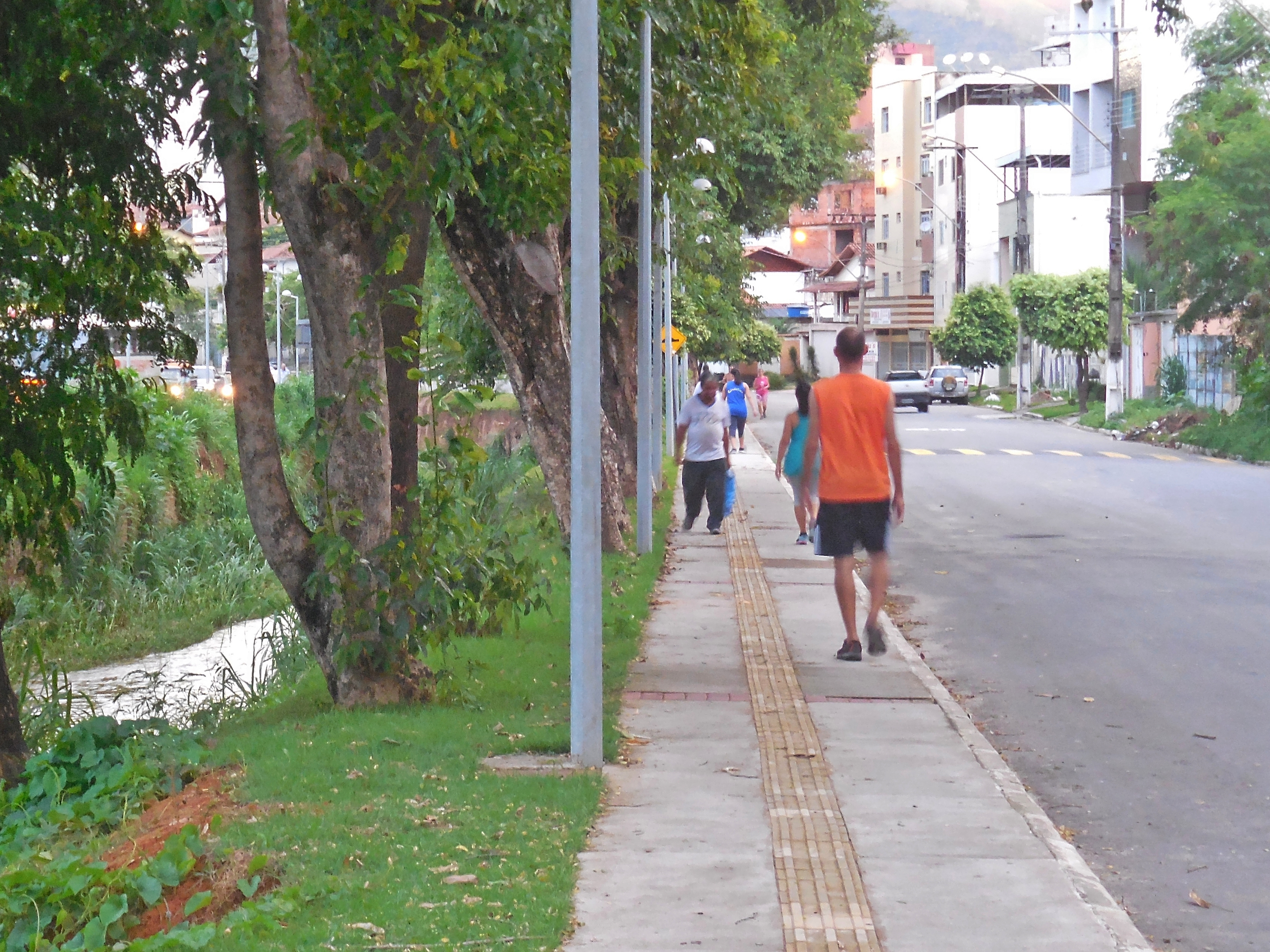
Walking track on Julita Pires Bretas Avenue, in the Santa Helena neighborhood, on the right bank of the stream.

== See also ==
- History of Coronel Fabriciano
