= Professores (Coronel Fabriciano) =

Brazilian neighborhood

- Neighborhood of Coronel Fabriciano
- Partial view of the Professores neighborhood from of the Santa Terezinha

- Location in Minas Gerais Professores (Brazil)
- Coordinates: 19°30′18″S 42°37′30″W
- Country: Brazil
- State: Minas Gerais
- Municipality/City: Coronel Fabriciano
- Zone: Senador Melo Viana District

Area
  - Total: 0.1 km^{2} (0.039 sq mi)

Population
  - Total: 887
  - Density: 7.094/km^{2} (18.37/sq mi)

Professores is a neighborhood in the Brazilian municipality of Coronel Fabriciano, in the interior of the state of Minas Gerais. It is located in the Senador Melo Viana district, in Sector 1. According to the Brazilian Institute of Geography and Statistics (IBGE), its population in 2010 was 887 inhabitants (0.9% of the municipality's total), distributed over an area of 0.1 km^{2}.

The neighborhood was created by the Padres do Trabalho Association in 1973 in order to mitigate the impact of the establishment of Unileste. It was originally a housing complex for the university's professors and staff. It is located next to the center of Fabriciano and includes the Louis Ensch Stadium and the headquarters of the city's boy scouts.

== History ==
The population growth in the current Vale do Aço Metropolitan Region caused by the installation of large industries between the 1930s and 1950s, led to the creation of the Catholic University Center of Eastern Minas Gerais (Unileste), the first large educational complex in the region, at the end of the 1960s. A few years later, the Padres do Trabalho Association, responsible for founding Unileste, was also in charge of building the Universitário neighborhood, for the students, and the Professores neighborhood, for the institution's teachers and staff.

The housing complexes were built in order to mitigate the impact of the establishment of Unileste. The Professores neighborhood was officially created in 1973 and the houses began to be completed in July of the same year, with the pavement already finished; the first inhabitant was Professor Ademir Castro. The original project had five blocks with 16 houses each. Most of the residences built were semi-detached, with two bedrooms, three bathrooms (one being a toilet), two living rooms, a kitchen, a garage and a backyard. The social part was restricted to the first floor, while the bedrooms were on the second floor.

Over time, new streets emerged on the surrounding land and were incorporated into the neighborhood, such as Sanitária Avenue (now Julita Pires Bretas Avenue), on the banks of the Caladão Stream, which street was created by channeling a stretch of the creek in gabions to minimize flooding between the 1970s and 80s. Later, most of the houses in the complex underwent renovations, and by the end of the 1980s almost all of the facades had been modified. Due to its proximity to the center of Fabriciano and its access to urban services and leisure activities, Professores has become an upscale residential neighborhood. In 2016, Julita Pires Bretas Avenue was revitalized and its sidewalk refurbished.

== Geography and demography ==
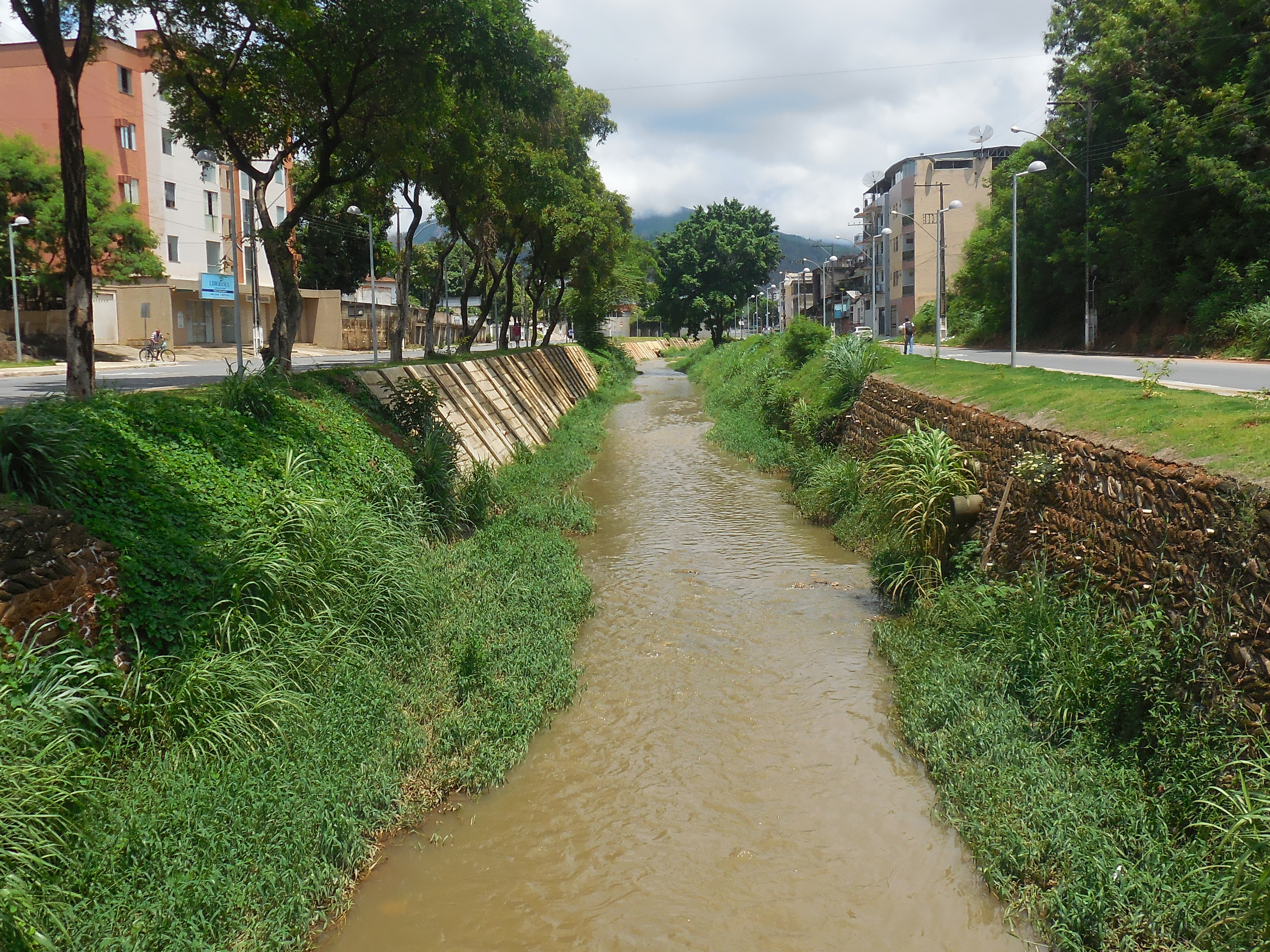
Caladão Stream between the Professores and Bom Jesus neighborhoods.

The Professores neighborhood has a total area of 0.1 km^{2} and is bordered by Giovannini (to the north), Centro (to the west), Santa Helena (to the south) and Bom Jesus (to the east) neighborhoods. Julita Pires Bretas Avenue borders the Caladão Stream, which cuts through the city and receives dirt and pollution from homes and small industries, workshops or slaughterhouses on its banks.

In 2010, the Brazilian Institute of Geography and Statistics (IBGE) estimated that 887 inhabitants lived in the neighborhood, which is comparable to the two least populous cities in Brazil: Borá, in São Paulo, and Serra da Saudade, in Minas Gerais. Among the 63 neighborhoods in Fabriciano, Professores ranked 35th in terms of population, comprising 0.9% of the municipal population and 1.9% of the population of the Senador Melo Viana district, with a population density of 7,094.47 inhabitants per square kilometer. Of the total number of inhabitants, 419 were men (47.2% of the total) and 468 women (52.8%), with a sex ratio of 89.53, distributed in 340 households. Among the men, the predominant age group was people aged between 20 and 24, who accounted for 4.85% of the total. Among women, people aged between 50 and 54 predominated, also accounting for 4.85% of the total female population.

The neighborhood is appreciated by the real estate sector, as homes are predominant and it is located next to the center of Fabriciano, one of the main commercial hubs in the region. It is covered by the Catholic pastoral work of the Community and Parish of Saint Sebastian, which represents the headquarters of the Diocese of Itabira-Fabriciano, and hosts some of the division's activities and events.

== Infrastructure and leisure ==
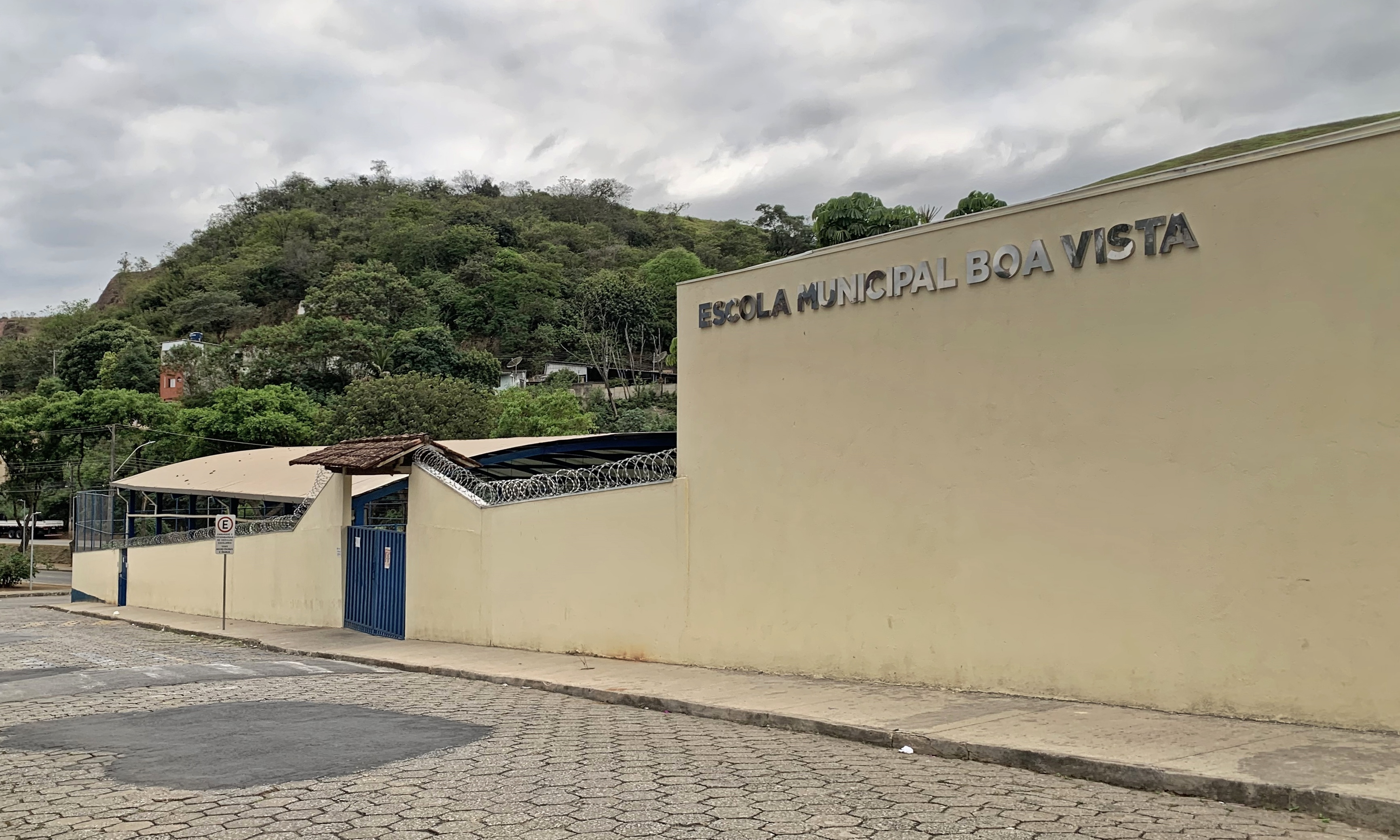
Facade of the Boa Vista Municipal School.

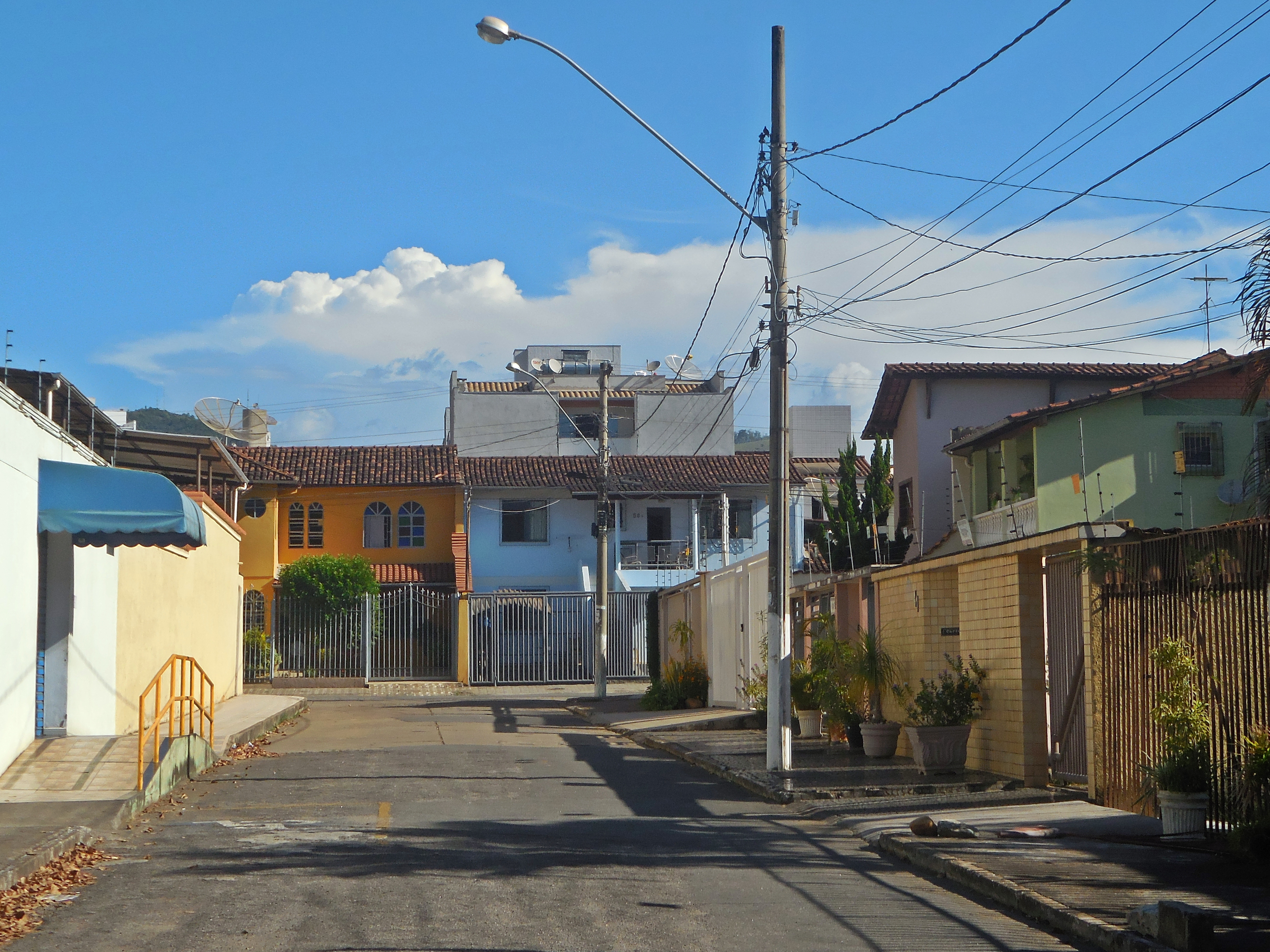
Aspect of the Professores neighborhood.

The neighborhood includes the building of the former Doutor Querubino State School, located on Ephrem Macedo Street. Initially established in the Nossa Senhora do Carmo neighborhood on February 15, 1968, the institution moved to its current building in 1983 after successive temporary relocations. However, the school was closed and its building became the headquarters of the Boa Vista Municipal School in 2020, which teaches elementary school classes. The water supply service is provided by Companhia de Saneamento de Minas Gerais (Copasa), while the electricity supply is the responsibility of Companhia Energética de Minas Gerais (Cemig), with 100% of the population having access to the electricity network.

The Pastor Pimentel Interchange, which is the link between Magalhães Pinto and Tancredo Neves avenues, also divides the residential area and the center of Fabriciano from the Giovannini neighborhood and the Senador Melo Viana district. There are no public transport buses inside the neighborhood, except on Julita Pires Bretas Avenue.

Inaugurated in 1950, the Louis Ensch Stadium, home of the Social Futebol Clube, is also located in the Professores neighborhood. It hosts important matches in local amateur leagues and official games in some categories of the Campeonato Mineiro. The Professores neighborhood also includes the headquarters of the Tapajós 27th Scouting Group, located on Amazonas Street, which operates since 1963 and offers children and young people various activities related to scouting. On Julita Pires Bretas Avenue, on the banks of the Caladão Stream, there is a sidewalk that is often used for leisure.

The neighborhood is also popular for its leisure activities organized by the Parish of Saint Sebastian or the schools. Until the 1990s, the Corpus Christi Procession began at the Parish Church of Saint Sebastian, headed to Pedro Nolasco Street and returned to the temple. After the Cathedral of Saint Sebastian was completed, it was transferred to the streets of the Santa Helena and Professores neighborhoods. The scout group also holds some activities open to the population at its headquarters.

== Gallery ==
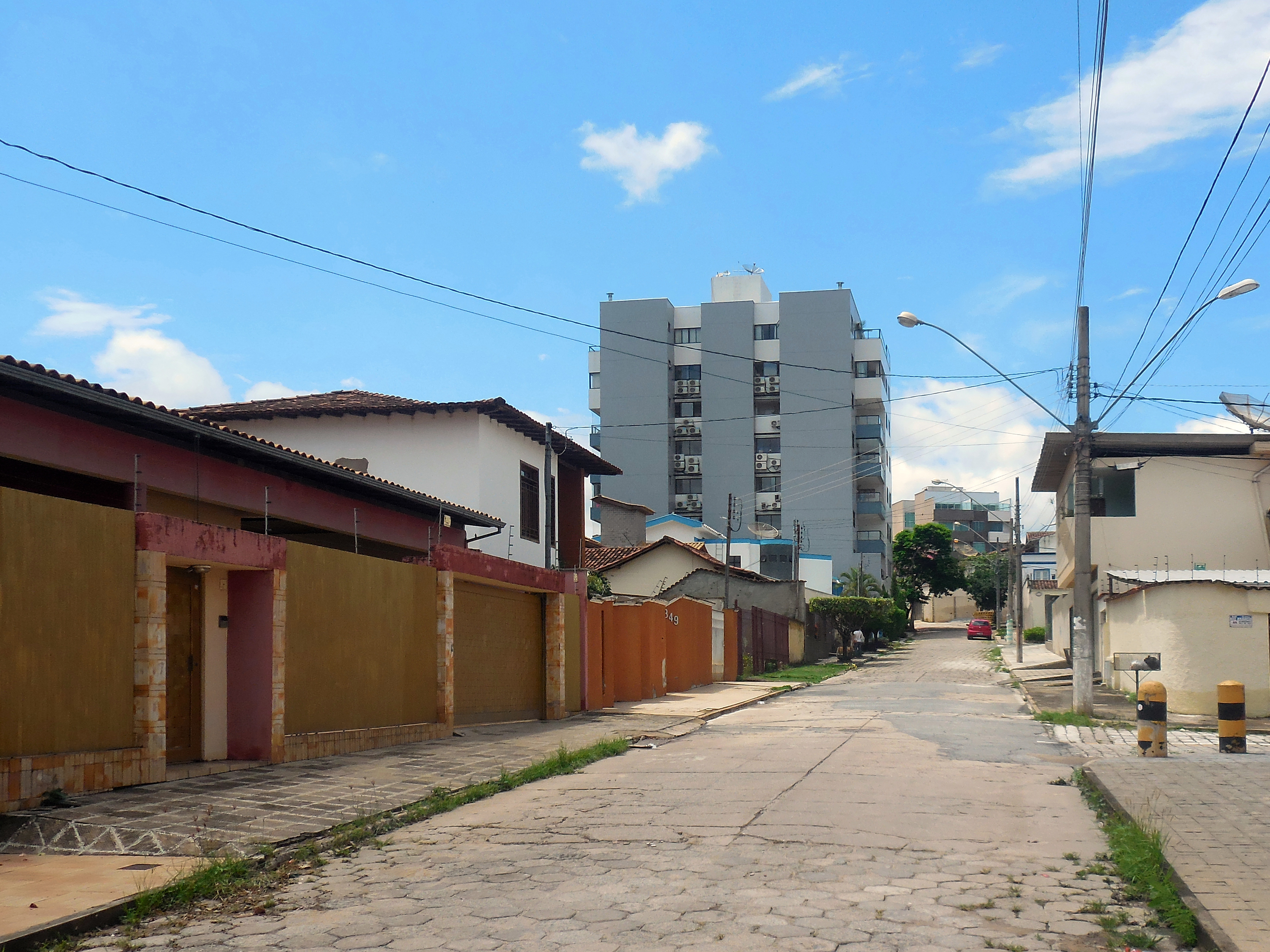
Dionísio Garcia Street in the Professores neighborhood.

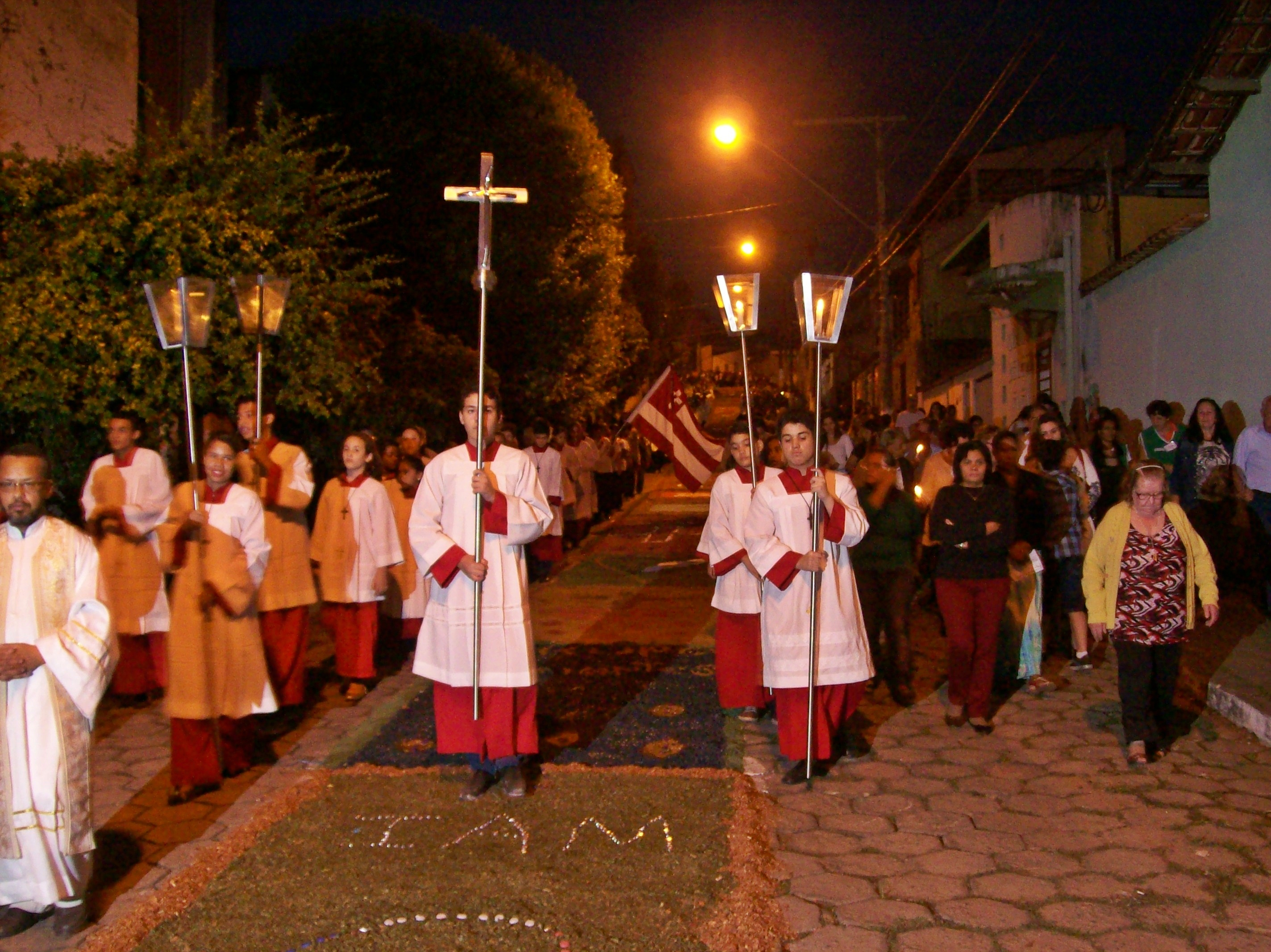
Corpus Christi Procession of the Parish of Saint Sebastian.

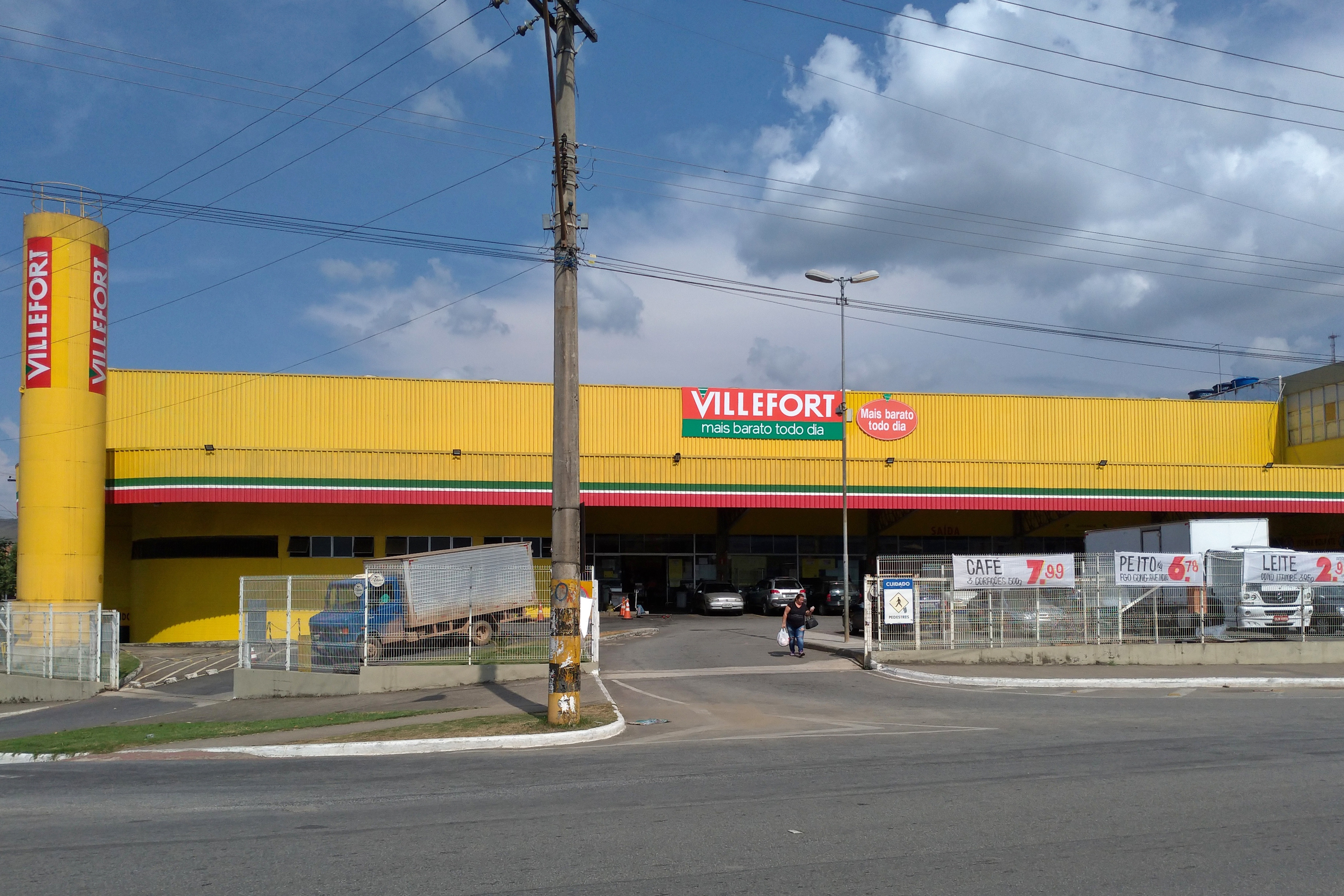
Facade of the Villefort Atacadista.

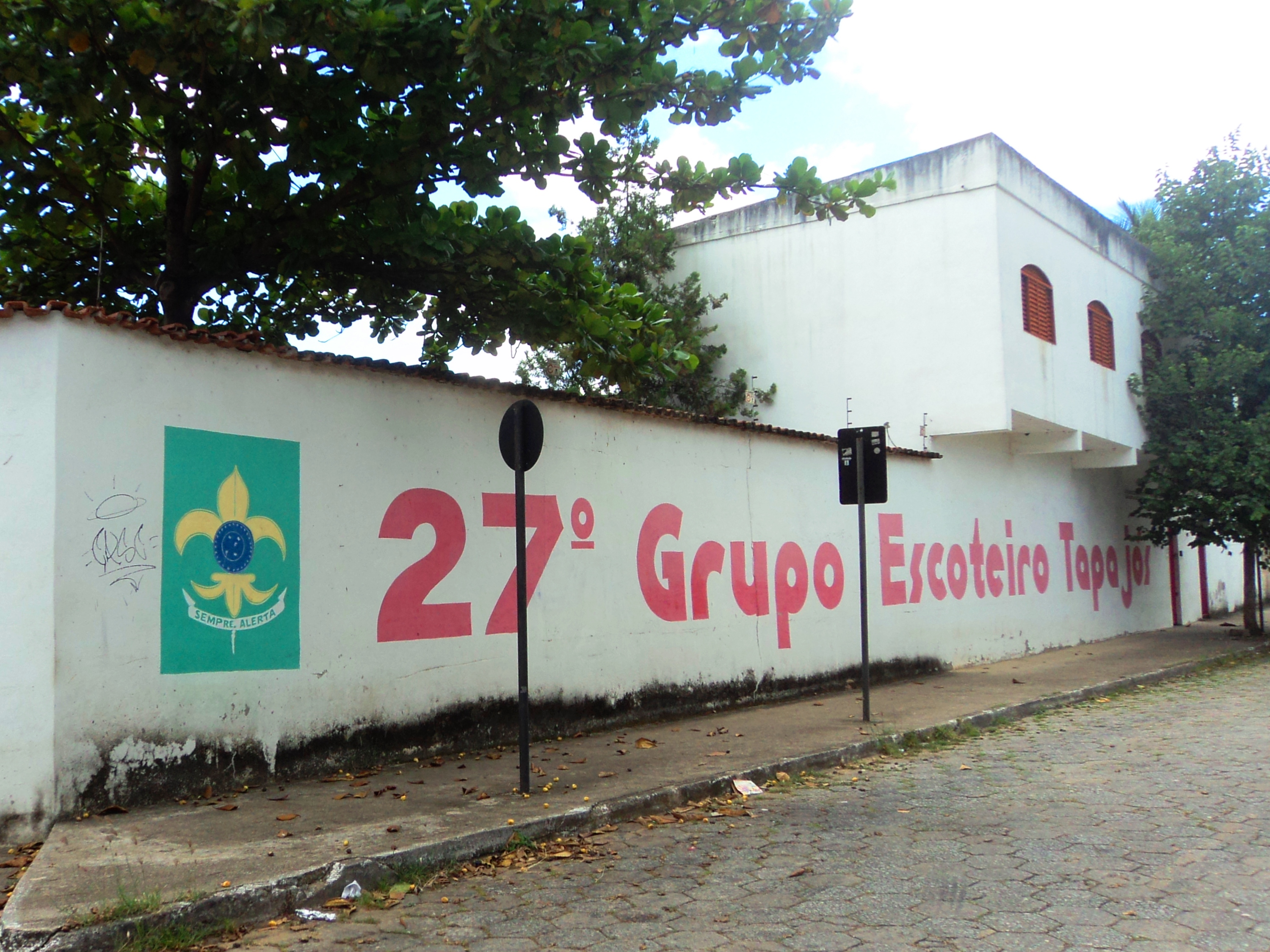
Front of the Tapajós 27th Scouting Group.

== See also ==
- List of neighborhoods of Coronel Fabriciano
- History of Coronel Fabriciano
