= Santa Helena (Coronel Fabriciano) =

Brazilian neighborhood

- Neighborhood of Coronel Fabriciano
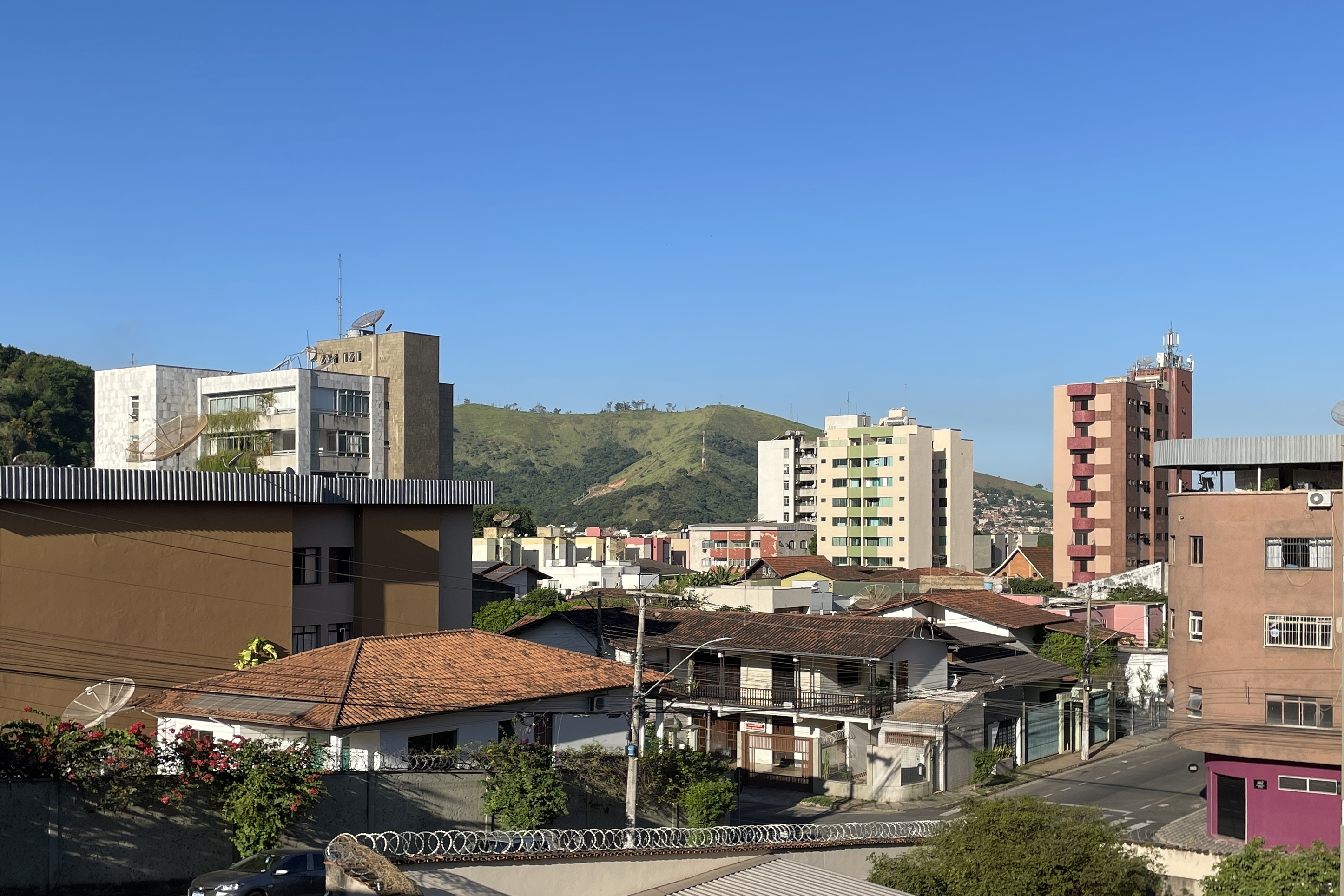
- View of the Santa Helena neighborhood

- Location in Minas Gerais Santa Helena (Brazil)
- Coordinates: 19°31′30″S 42°37′22″W
- Country: Brazil
- State: Minas Gerais
- Municipality/City: Coronel Fabriciano
- Zone: Headquarters district

Area
  - Total: 0.2 km^{2} (0.077 sq mi)

Population
  - Total: 1,359
  - Density: 7,602/km^{2} (19,690/sq mi)

Santa Helena is a neighborhood in the Brazilian municipality of Coronel Fabriciano, in the interior of the state of Minas Gerais. It is located in the headquarters district, in Sector 1. According to the Brazilian Institute of Geography and Statistics (IBGE), its population in 2010 was 1 359 inhabitants (1.3% of the municipality's total), distributed over an area of 0.2 km^{2}.

Originally, the area was occupied by the Santa Helena Sawmill, inaugurated in 1948 and one of the city's main industrial enterprises. After the closure of the complex, the lands were allotted in the 1970s and became a highly valued residential neighborhood, close to the Centro. The Cathedral of Saint Sebastian, the seat of the Diocese of Itabira-Fabriciano, and the Casa de Campo Club, which is the oldest club in the city, are located in the neighborhood.

== History ==
Originally, the area where the Santa Helena neighborhood is located belonged to Joaquim Cézar Santos, who settled in the current municipality of Coronel Fabriciano to work for Belgo-Mineira at the end of the 1930s. In 1944, Joaquim began the construction of the Santa Helena Sawmill, which was inaugurated on June 28, 1948, a few months before the emancipation of the municipality. The company contributed to structural and economic development alongside the Belgo and Acesita industrial centers, which were responsible for the population growth.

The Santa Helena Sawmill became one of the main charcoal producers in the region, supplying raw materials to local industries and small furniture factories and making wooden floors, which were soon replaced by slate and ceramics. At its peak, the company employed around 180 people and had one of the largest fleets of trucks in the city. The sawmill was active until the mid-1960s, when it went bankrupt due to the scarcity of wood, which supplied demand from neighboring steel complexes, and the emergence of large furniture factories that reclaimed space from smaller-scale producers, reducing demand for the raw material.

In the 1960s, an accident on the Vitória-Minas Railway (EFVM) with a train carrying fuel wagons parked near the Santa Helena Sawmill severely affected its facilities and contributed to its closure. The EFVM crossed the current Rubem Siqueira Maia Avenue until the railroad section was relocated outside the urban perimeter at the end of the 70s. In its place, the avenue linking the Centro to the Mangueiras neighborhood was built. After the sawmill closed, the land was allotted in the 1970s by M. Linhares Imóveis and the Archdiocese of Mariana, which preserved its name. At the time, it was considered the only space in the municipality available for housing construction.

During the 1970s and 80s, some of the city's most expensive residences were built in the area, which practically drained the availability of plots. As a result, Santa Helena became a highly valued residential neighborhood due to its proximity to the downtown Fabriciano and its access to urban services and leisure. In 1979, the first buildings were completed, totaling 60 apartments. In the same decade, the Sanitária Avenue (now Julita Pires Bretas Avenue) was built, along the banks of the Caladão Stream and channeled with gabions in order to minimize flooding. Between 2015 and 2016, Julita Pires Bretas Avenue underwent a revitalization of its sidewalk and the Parque Linear Square and other leisure spaces were built.

== Geography and demography ==
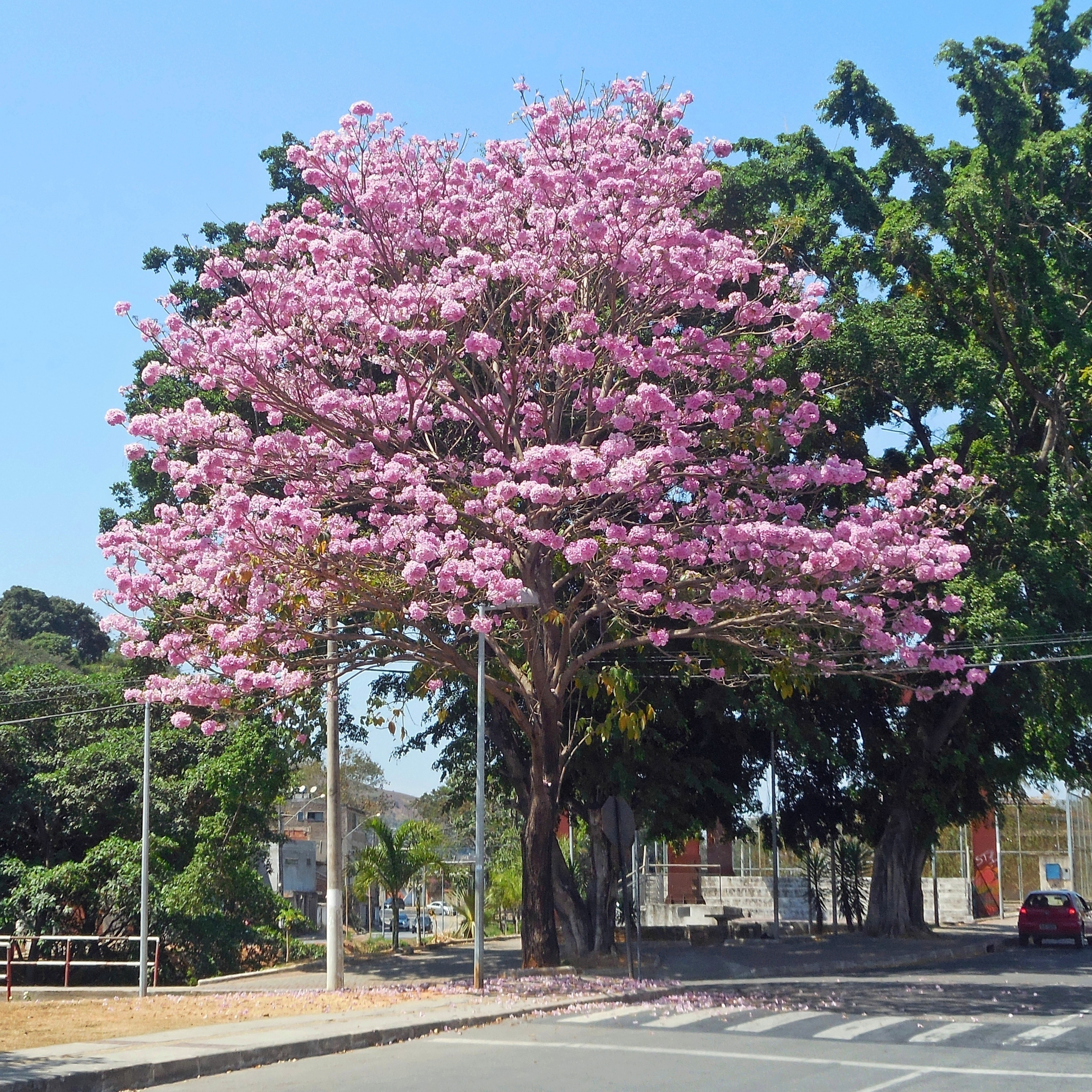
Flowers of pink trumpet tree in the Julita Pires Bretas Avenue.

The Santa Helena neighborhood has a total area of 0.2 km^{2} and is bordered by the districts of Santa Terezinha, Bom Jesus (to the east), Professores (to the north) and Centro (to the west), and the municipality of Timóteo (to the south). It covers the spot where the Caladão Stream flows into the Piracicaba River and, although the neighborhood is bathed by the course, flooding is not common along this stretch. When the level of the Piracicaba is high, flooding doesn't occur either.

The vegetation is decent, especially on Julita Pires Bretas Avenue, which borders the Caladão Stream. There is a sidewalk along the road, which is often used for leisure. The neighborhood has a considerable presence of vacant lots, which are often used improperly for dumping garbage and burning, causing a risk of disease transmission and contamination of the soil and the local hydrography.

In 2010, the Brazilian Institute of Geography and Statistics (IBGE) estimated that 1 359 inhabitants lived in the neighborhood, which is comparable to cities in Minas Gerais such as Cedro do Abaeté and Serra da Saudade. Among the 63 neighborhoods in Fabriciano, Santa Helena ranked 25th among the most populous, comprising 1.3% of the municipal population and 3.2% of the population of the headquarters district, with a population density of 7,602.2 inhabitants per square kilometer. Of the total number of inhabitants, 628 were men (46.2% of the total) and 11.227 women (69.8%), distributed in 505 households. Among men, the predominant age group was between 50 and 54 years old, which accounted for 4.93% of the total, while among women there was a predominance of people aged 40 to 44 and 45 to 49, each accounting for 5.08% of the total female population.

The neighborhood is highly valued by the real estate sector, as there is a predominance of residential housing next to downtown Fabriciano, one of the main commercial areas in the region. However, there is little availability of plots and properties for sale, as well as traffic problems and a lack of parking nearby. Santa Helena is home to the Cathedral of Saint Sebastian, which belongs to the Parish of Saint Sebastian and is the seat of the Diocese of Itabira-Fabriciano.

== Infrastructure and leisure ==
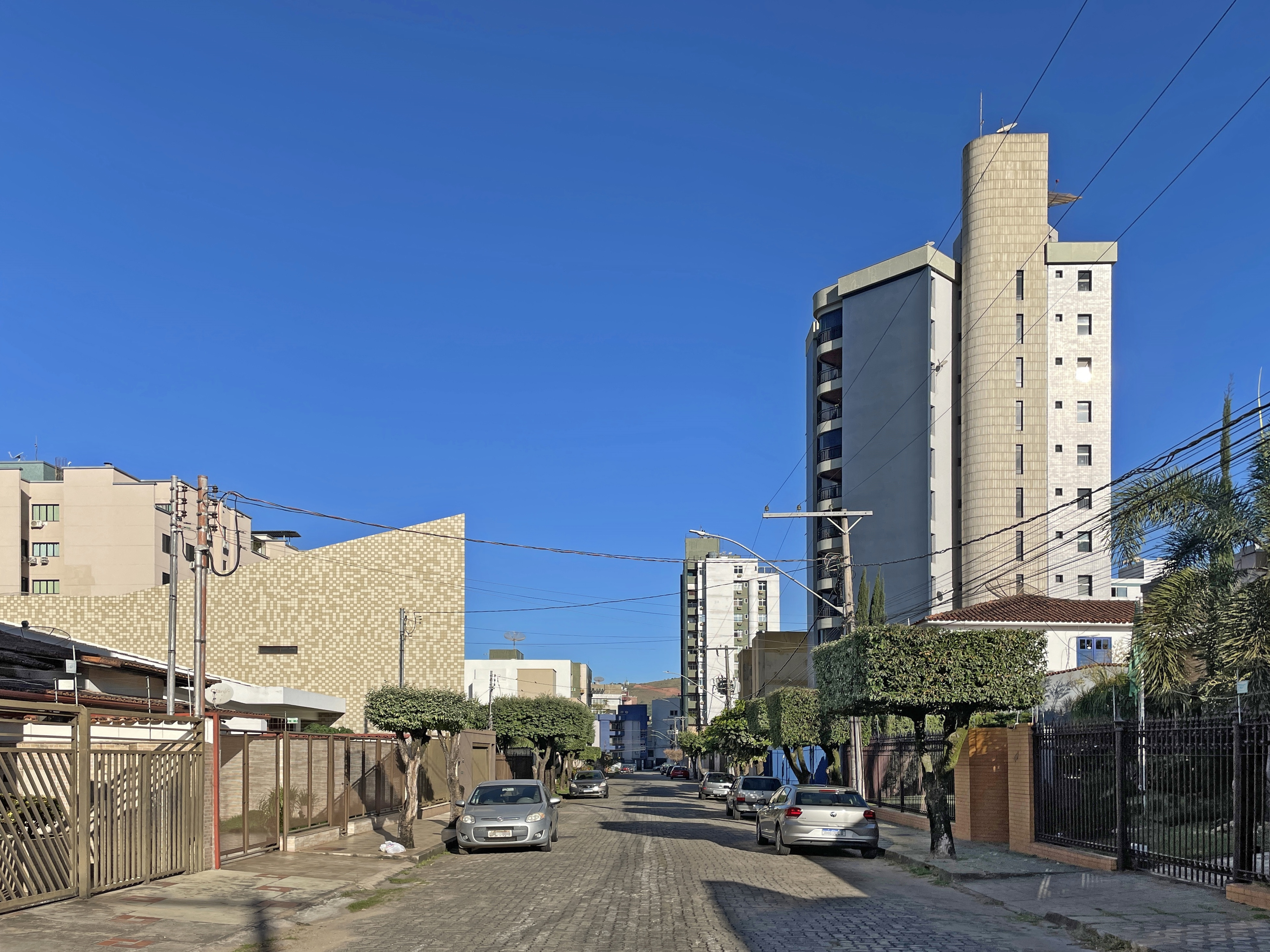
Street in Santa Helena neighbourhood.

According to data from the State Department of Education (SEE), the Santa Helena neighborhood had two educational institutions in August 2013: the Cruz Vermelha Preschool, which provided preschool education; and the Ethos Institute of Education (formerly Canarinho Encantado), a private institution created in 1984 and moved to its current location in 1999 that provides preschool and elementary school education. The Doutor José Maria Morais Hospital (formerly the Siderúrgica Hospital) is located in Argemiro José Ribeiro Street and was created in 1936 to contain an epidemic of tropical diseases that was spreading through the east of Minas Gerais.

The water supply is provided by Companhia de Saneamento de Minas Gerais (Copasa), while the electricity supply is provided by Companhia Energética de Minas Gerais (Cemig), with 100% of the population having access to the electricity network. There are no public transport buses in the neighborhood, except on Julita Pires Bretas and Rubem Siqueira Maia avenues. Among the main buildings in the Santa Helena neighborhood are the Cathedral of Saint Sebastian, inaugurated in 1993 and with a capacity for more than 1,200 people, and the Casa de Campo Club (CCC), the oldest club in the city, founded in 1966 and equipped with tennis, shuttlecock and futsal courts, as well as swimming pools, soccer fields and an events center. The José Maximiano de Sousa Square, rebuilt on Rubem Siqueira Maia Avenue in 2012, and the CREAS Square, erected next to the headquarters of the Specialized Reference Center for Social Assistance (CREAS) in 2016, are some of the public leisure spaces that have sports equipment and toys.

The neighbourhood also has leisure activities for the population organized by the Parish of Saint Sebastian and schools. Every year in January, the Cathedral celebrates the Feast of Saint Sebastian in honor of the patron saint after whom the church is named, as well as the town's anniversary. During Holy Week and the Corpus Christi holiday, there are processions through the streets of the town and neighboring districts, starting from the Cathedral. Every year the Arraiá do Bastião also occurs near the church, with square dance performances and the sale and consumption of typical food in stalls, bringing together the population of Santa Helena and nearby neighborhoods. On New Year's Eve, the Casa de Campo Club holds celebrations and parties.

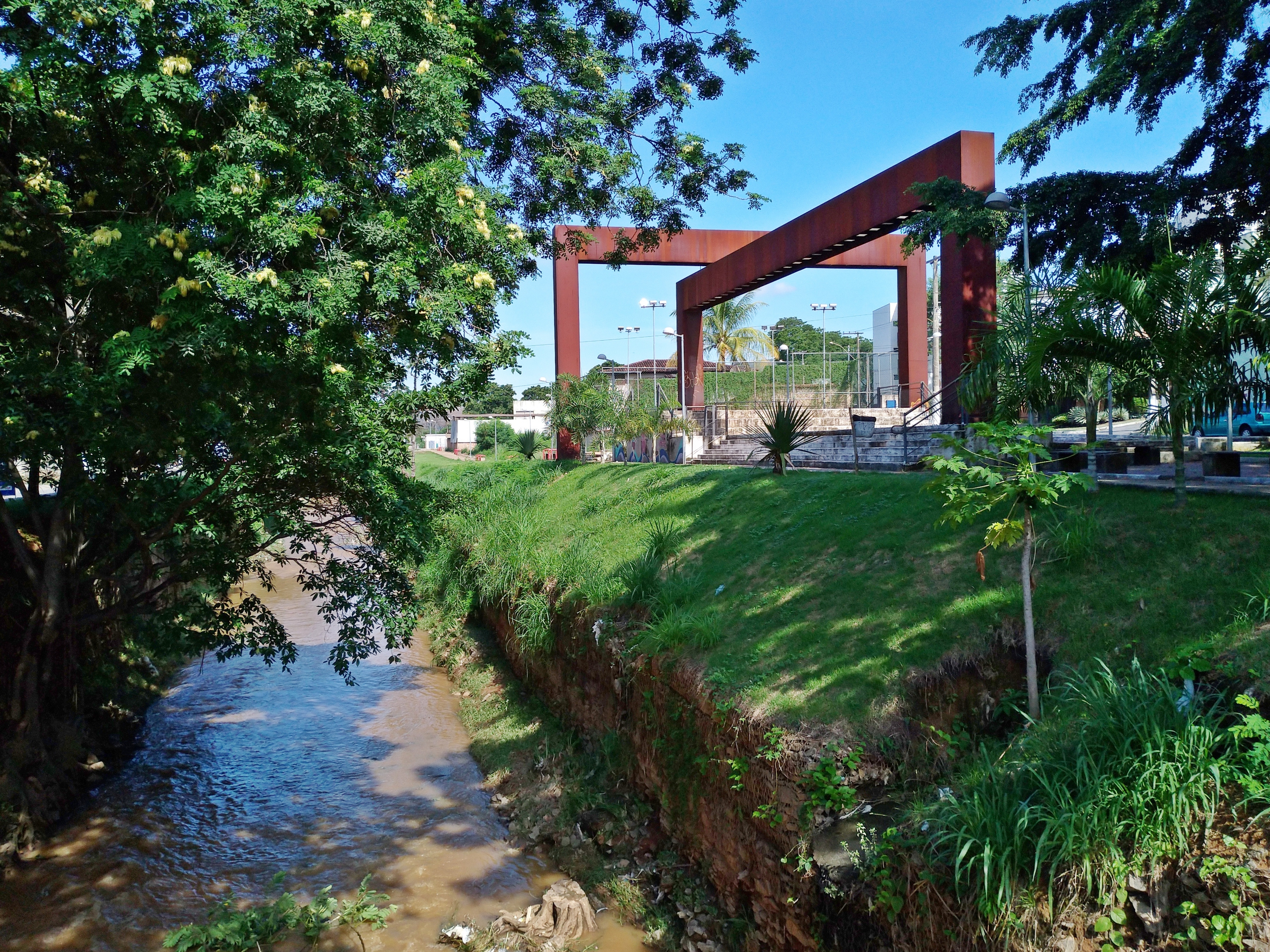
The Caladão Stream and the Parque Linear Square.

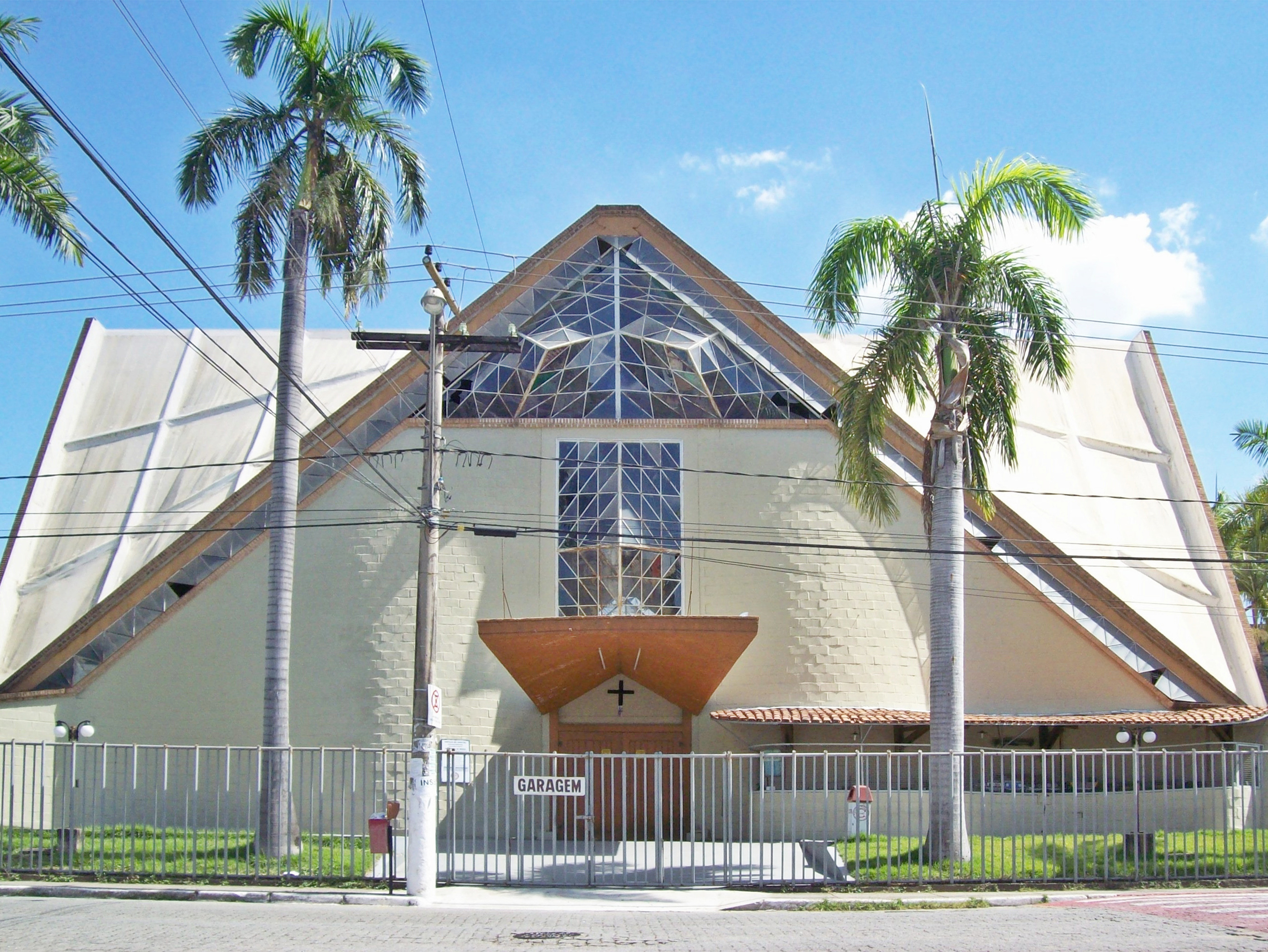
Front of the Cathedral of Saint Sebastian.

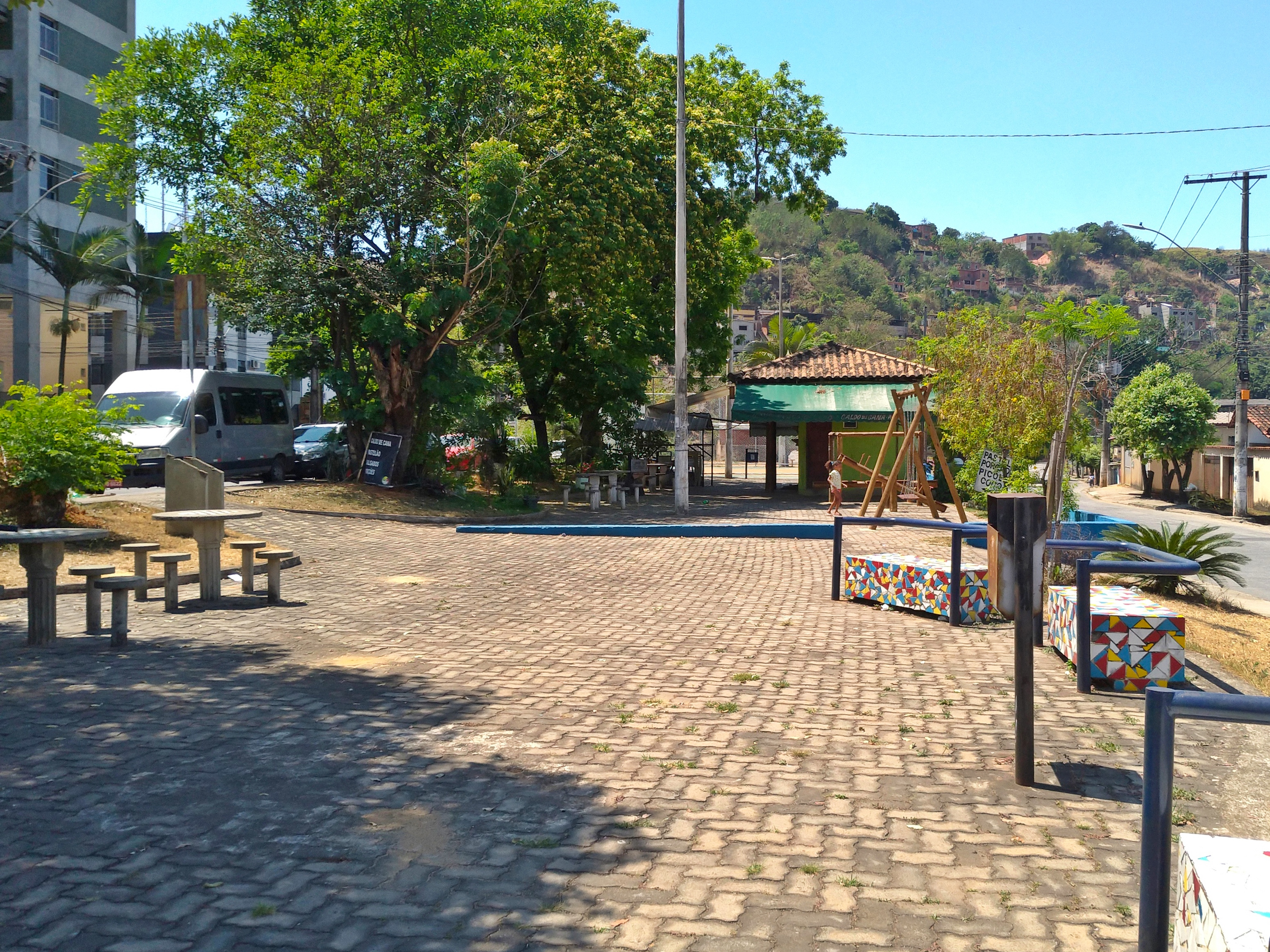
View of the José Maximiano de Sousa Square.

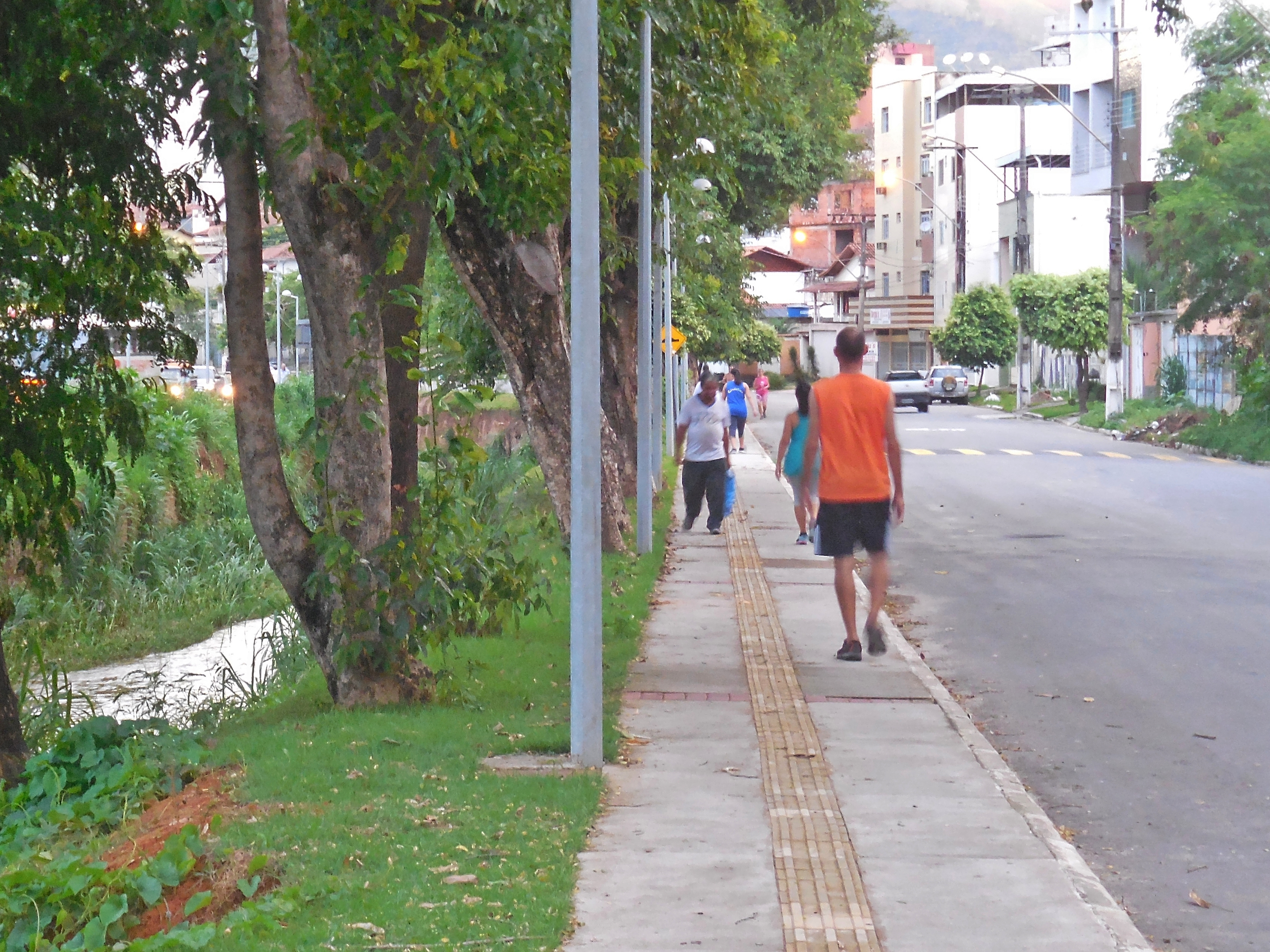
Walking path on the Caladão Stream.

== See also ==
- List of neighborhoods of Coronel Fabriciano
- History of Coronel Fabriciano
