= Giovannini (Coronel Fabriciano) =

Brazilian neighborhood

- Neighborhood of Coronel Fabriciano
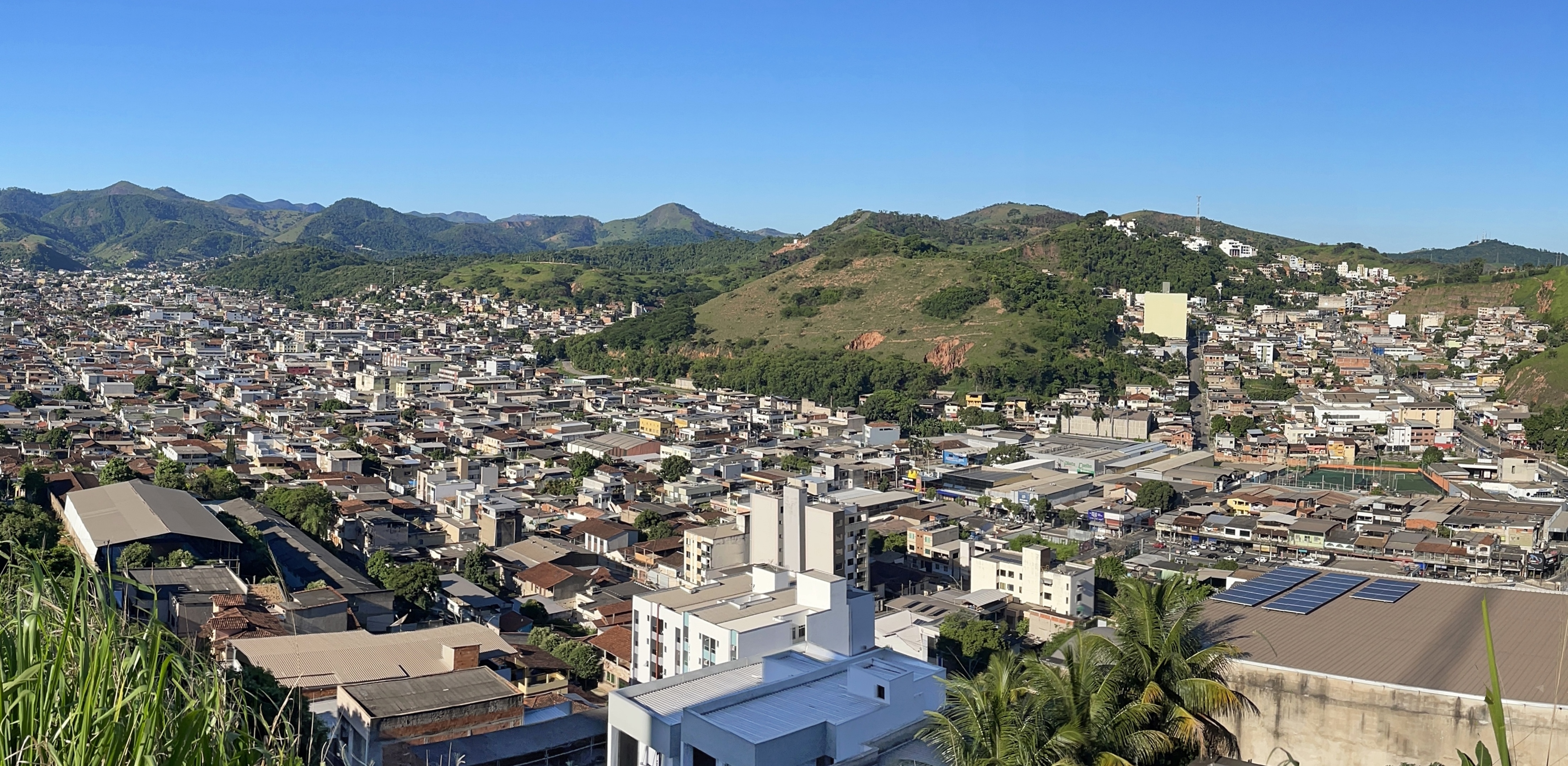
- View of the Giovannini neighborhood from Alto Giovannini

- Location in Minas Gerais Giovannini (Brazil)
- Coordinates: 19°30′53″S 42°37′50″W
- Country: Brazil
- State: Minas Gerais
- Municipality/City: Coronel Fabriciano
- Zone: Senador Melo Viana District

Area
  - Total: 0.5 km^{2} (0.19 sq mi)

Population
  - Total: 3,020
  - Density: 5.492/km^{2} (14.22/sq mi)

Giovannini is a neighborhood in the Brazilian municipality of Coronel Fabriciano, in the state of Minas Gerais. It is located in the Senador Melo Viana district, in Sector 4. According to the Brazilian Institute of Geography and Statistics (IBGE), its population in 2010 was 3,020 (2.9% of the municipality's total), distributed over an area of 0.5 km^{2}.

The area of the current neighborhood was occupied by Giovannini Farm, administered by the Archdiocese of Mariana and Alberto Giovannini. In the 1950s, the land was plotted and the neighborhood was officially created. It is named after Giovannini, who collaborated on several buildings in the residential area, such as the Alberto Giovannini State School and Coronel Fabriciano's first bus station.

In the following decades, the neighborhood expanded and became one of the most populous areas in Coronel Fabriciano. The area includes buildings such as the Church of the Good Shepherd, which features a ceramic mosaic on its facade, and the Senhor do Bonfim Municipal Cemetery. The Governador José de Magalhães Pinto Avenue is the main link between the center of Fabriciano and the Senador Melo Viana district.

== History ==
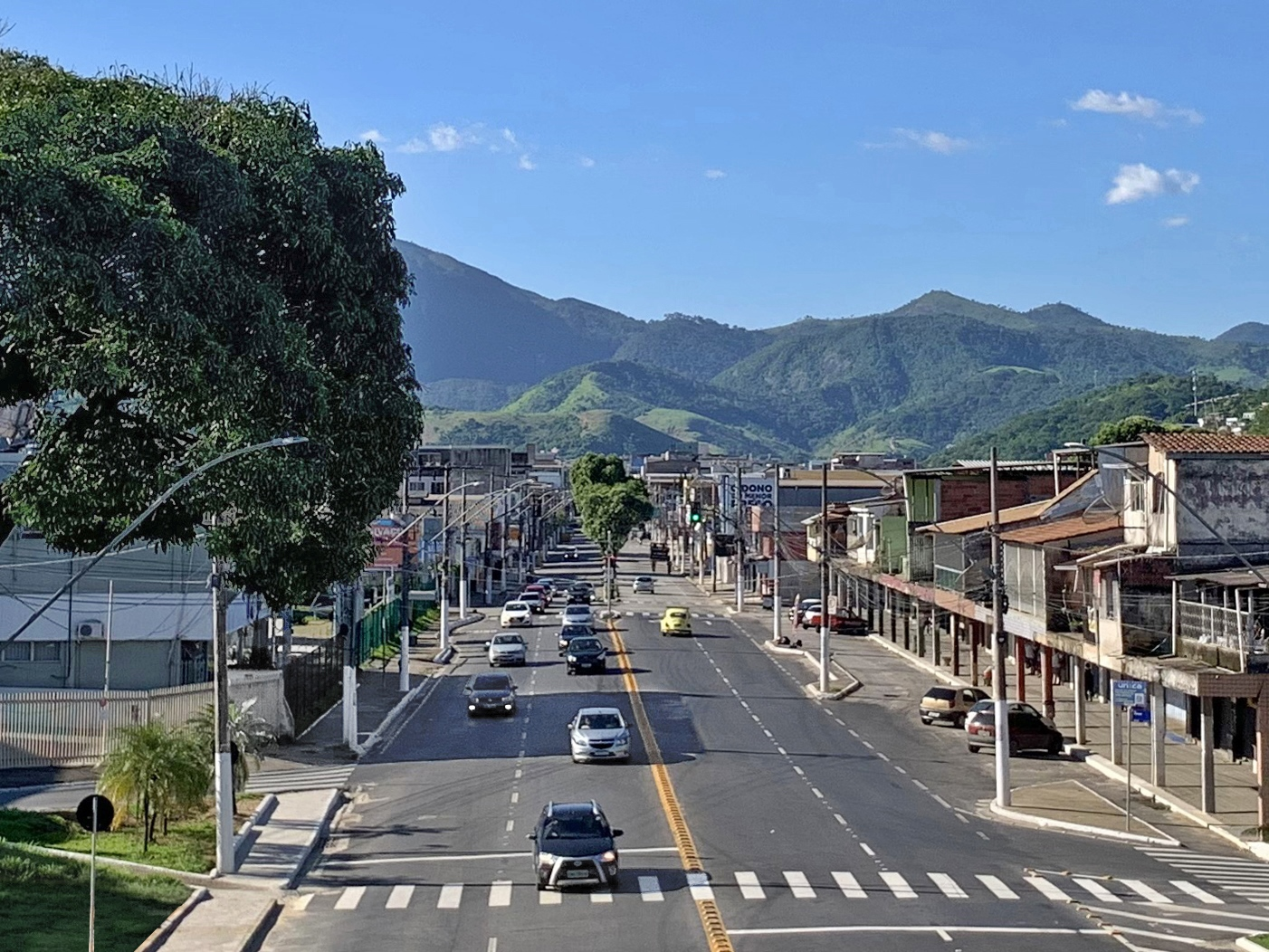
Governador José de Magalhães Pinto Avenue seen from the Pastor Pimentel Interchange, in Coronel Fabriciano.

Originally, the area where the Giovannini neighborhood is located was owned by the Giovannini Farm. The land between Governador José de Magalhães Pinto Avenue (then Dom Helvécio Avenue) and Belvedere belonged to Alberto Giovannini, while the area between Governador José de Magalhães Pinto Avenue and the current Júlia Kubitschek neighborhood belonged to the Archdiocese of Mariana, under the supervision of Father Rocha, who was also responsible for the land in the current São Domingos, Recanto Verde and Bom Jesus neighborhoods. In the 1950s, the land was divided into lots and converted into a neighborhood, named after Alberto Giovannini, who was born in Queluz in São Paulo and lived in Coronel Fabriciano since August 1927, where he died on September 25, 1963.

In Coronel Fabriciano, Alberto Giovannini worked as a businessman, merchant, landowner and banker. He inaugurated the Banco da Lavoura, the city's first bank branch, and donated land for the construction of the Senhor do Bonfim Municipal Cemetery, and the municipality's first state school, inaugurated in 1969 and named Alberto Giovannini State School. He also helped negotiate the construction of Fabriciano's first bus terminal, now known as the Rodoviária Velha, where stores and low-class apartments are concentrated. In 1978, the cornerstone was laid for the Church of the Good Shepherd, built in an area that had been used by the population for events. The structural and demographic development, combined with representative commerce, has made Giovannini one of the most populous areas in the city.

== Geography and demography ==
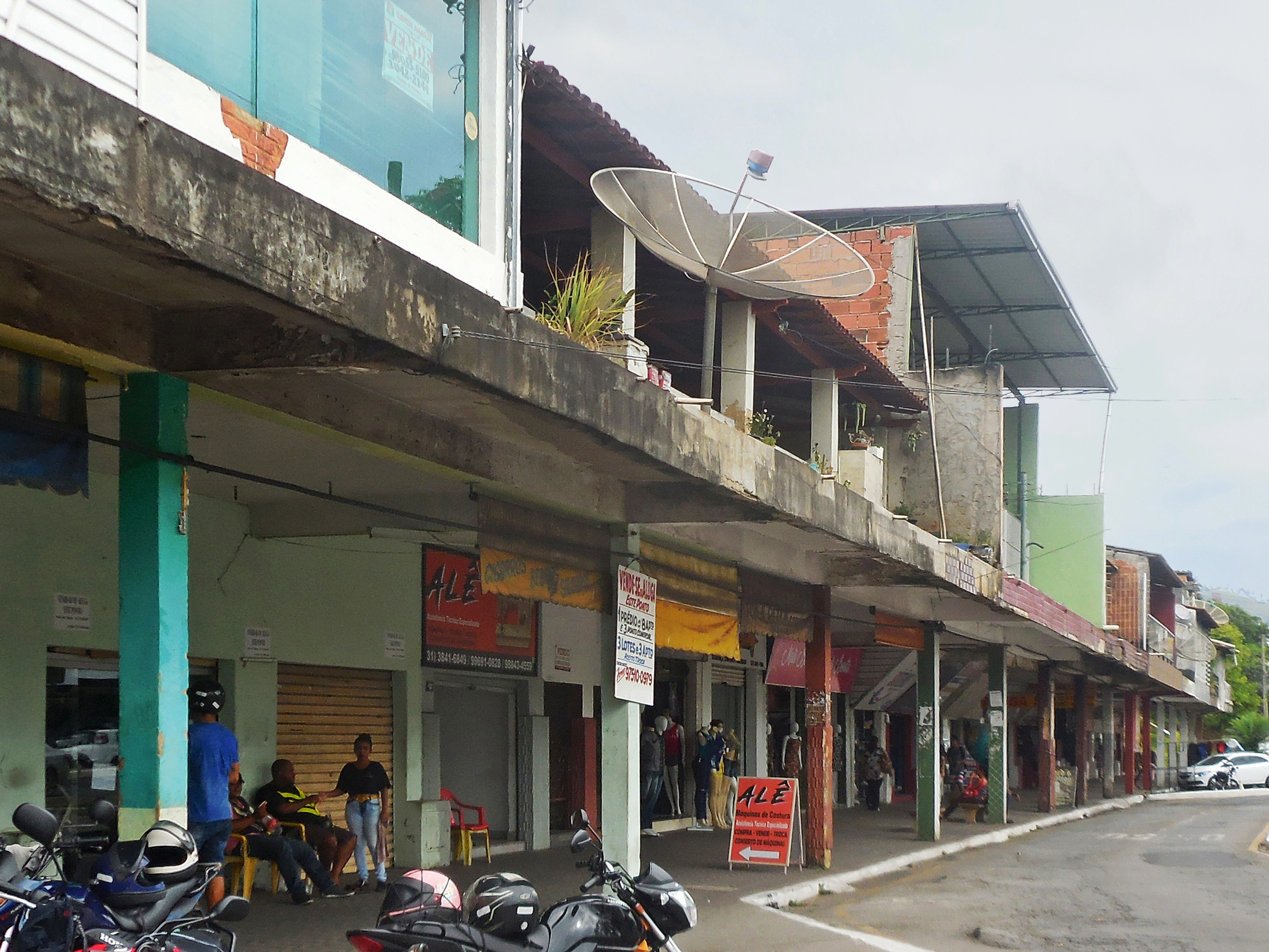
Shops in the old bus station of Coronel Fabriciano.

The Giovannini neighborhood has a total area of 0.5 km^{2} and is bordered by the districts of Melo Viana, Santo Eloy, Belvedere (to the north), Alto Giovannini (to the west), Nazaré, Centro, Professores (to the south), Bom Jesus, Vila Bom Jesus and Júlia Kubitschek (to the east). Alto Giovannini originated as an extension of the original occupation, but is considered an independent neighborhood by both the IBGE and the municipal administration's geoprocessing system of 2020. It is bordered by the Caladão Stream, which cuts through the city and receives dirt and pollution from homes and small industries, workshops or slaughterhouses on its banks.

In 2010, the Brazilian Institute of Geography and Statistics (IBGE) estimated that 3 020 inhabitants lived in the neighborhood, which is comparable to cities in Minas Gerais such as Jaguaraçu, Rio Doce and Carmésia. Among the 63 neighborhoods in Fabriciano, Giovannini ranked 11th among the most populous, comprising 2.9% of the municipal population and 5.6% of the population of the Senador Melo Viana district, with a population density of 5,492.91 inhabitants per square kilometer. Of the total number of inhabitants, 1,421 were men (47.1% of the total) and 1,599 women (52.9%).

According to the IBGE, in 2010 there were a total of 1,088 households. Although it is located between the Melo Viana neighborhood and downtown Fabriciano, which are the municipality's main commercial centers, Giovannini attracts significant commercial traffic, especially along Governador José de Magalhães Pinto Avenue. The Church of the Good Shepherd is the headquarters of the Community of the Good Shepherd, whose Catholic pastoral work also covers the surrounding neighborhoods and is subordinate to the Parish of Saint Anthony, under the jurisdiction of the Itabira-Fabriciano Diocese. Regarding other religions, the neighborhood features a Jehovah's Witness temple and the headquarters of the Seventh-day Adventist Church.

== Infrastructure ==
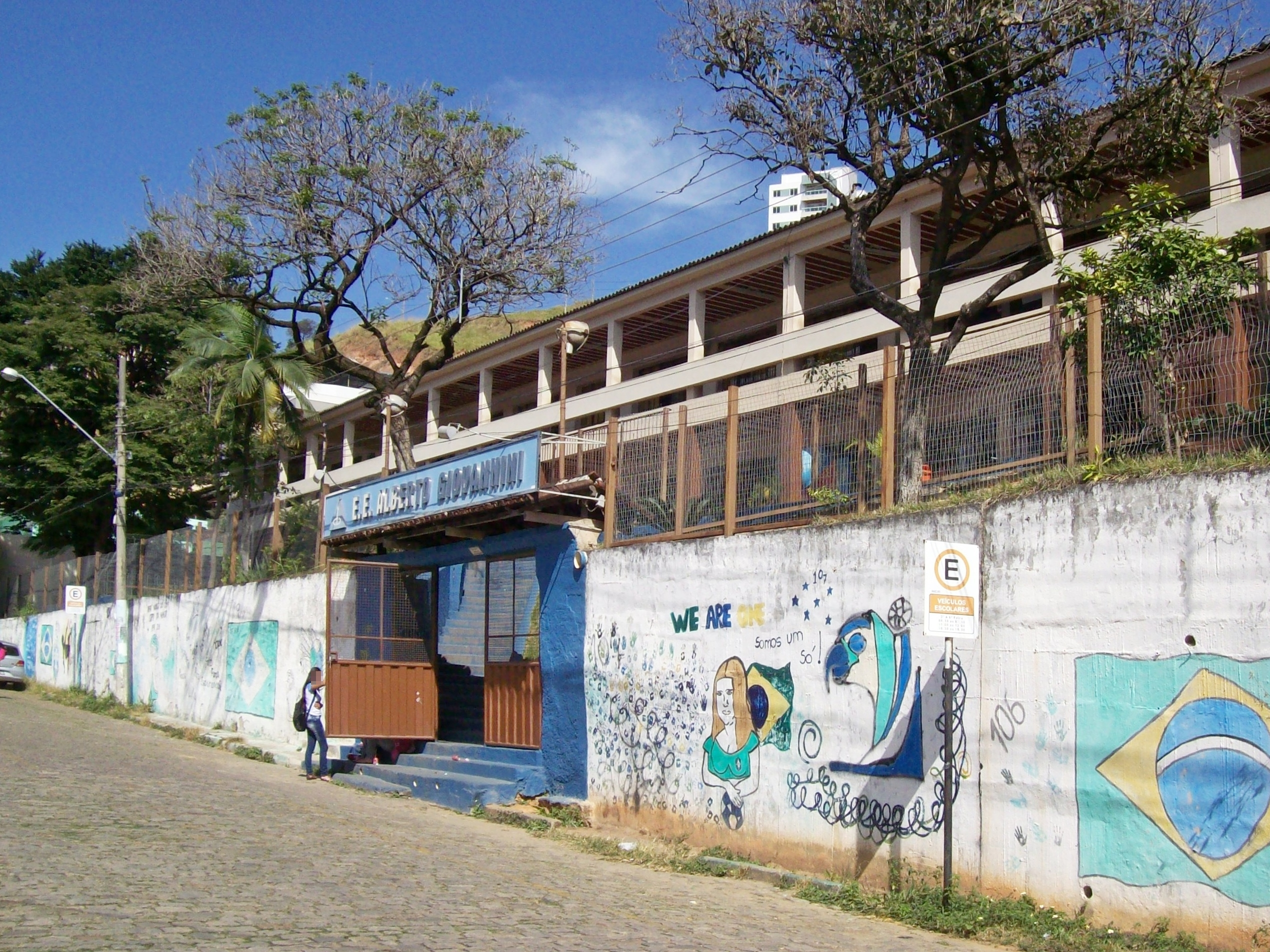
Front of the Alberto Giovannini State School.

According to data from the State Department of Education (SEE), the educational institutions located in Giovannini are: the Sítio do Pica-pau Pedagogical Center, a private school that provides preschool and the first grades of primary education (up to 5th grade); the Professor Francisco Letro State School, which offers primary education from 1st to 5th grade; and the Alberto Giovannini State School, a public high school and one of the best-placed institutions in the National High School Exam (ENEM) in Coronel Fabriciano. The water supply service is provided by Companhia de Saneamento de Minas Gerais (Copasa), while the electricity supply is the responsibility of Companhia Energética de Minas Gerais (Cemig), with 100% of the population having access to the electricity network.

There is a branch of the Correios on Governador José de Magalhães Pinto Avenue. The city's first bus terminal was located in Giovannini, but it was replaced by another one in downtown Fabriciano. Magalhães Pinto Avenue connects the district to Presidente Tancredo de Almeida Neves Avenue, which links it to the neighboring cities of Ipatinga and Timóteo. The Pastor Pimentel Interchange, which intersects Magalhães Pinto and Tancredo Neves avenues, also divides Giovannini from downtown Fabriciano. There are municipal public transport bus lines that serve the neighborhood, and many of the routes that connect the central region to the interior of the Senador Melo Viana district use Magalhães Pinto Avenue to reach their destinations.

== Culture ==
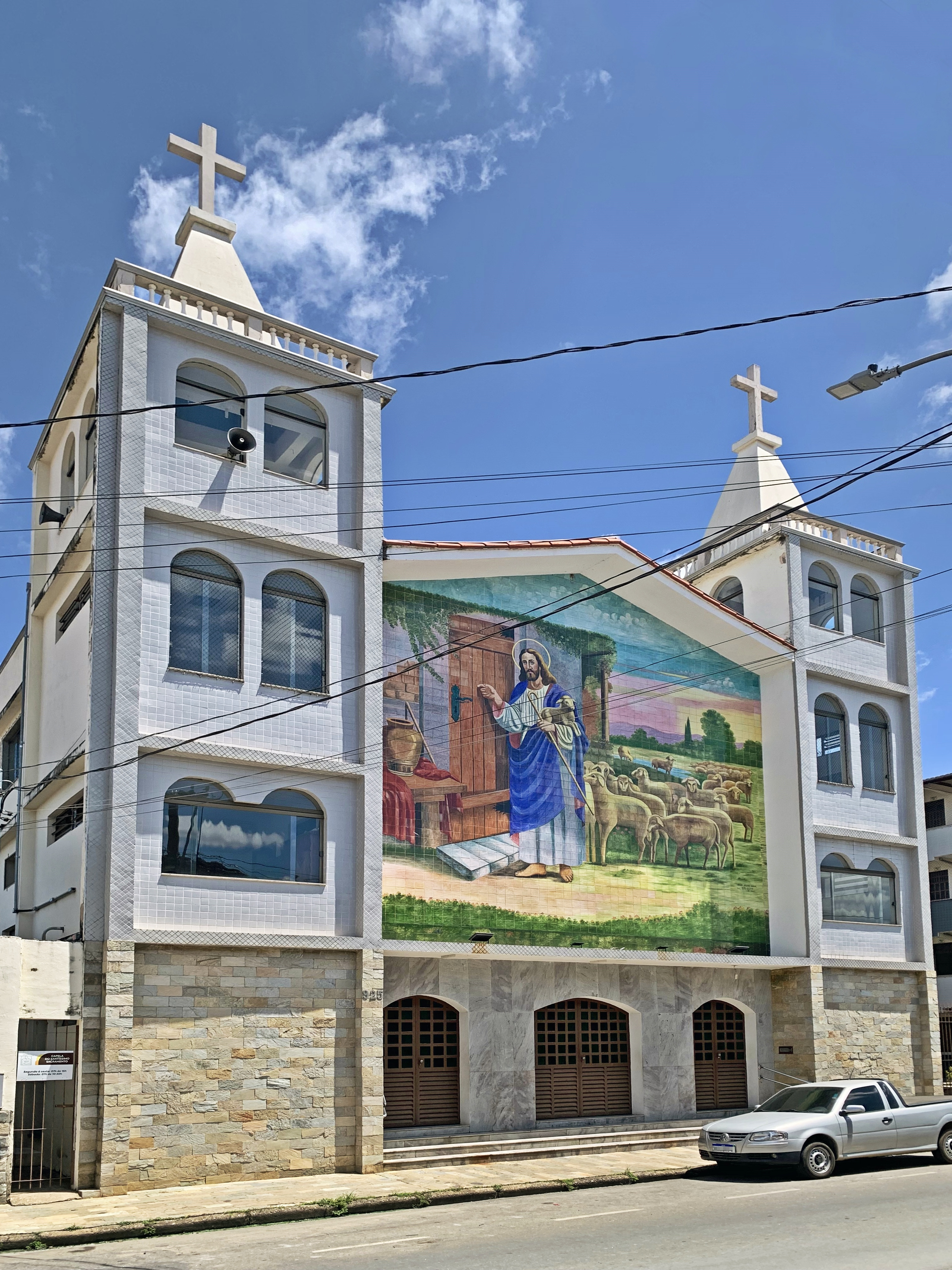
Front of the Church of the Good Shepherd.

The area includes buildings such as the Church of the Good Shepherd, whose facade features a ceramic mosaic depicting Jesus with a flock of sheep, and the Senhor do Bonfim Municipal Cemetery, where around 30,000 bodies have been buried in approximately 2,000 graves. Magalhães Pinto Avenue concentrates much of the town's nightlife, with a considerable number of bars and restaurants.

There are also leisure activities for the local population, which are often organized by the Community of the Good Shepherd. The church celebrates the Feast of the Good Shepherd every year in May, with processions, masses and shows in honor of the patron saint after whom the church is named. The state schools in the area also organize events aimed at the population, such as environmental awareness campaigns and educational talks, and on All Souls' Day the Municipal Cemetery receives thousands of visitors to the graves. The neighbourhood's open-air market is also organized every week. It was set up in the mid-1970s, initially in the center of Fabriciano. Years later it was transferred to the Professores neighborhood and Nazaré, until it reached Giovannini.

== See also ==
- List of neighborhoods of Coronel Fabriciano
