= Chico Simões =

Brazilian politician (1950–2026)

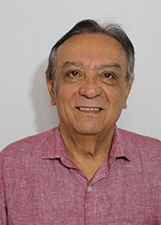
- Simões in 2020

Member of the Legislative Assembly of Minas Gerais
- In office 1 February 2003 – 1 January 2005

Personal details
- Born: Francisco de Assis Simões Thomaz; 17 October 1950 Dom Joaquim, Brazil
- Died: 6 July 2026 (aged 75) Coronel Fabriciano, Brazil
- Party: PT
- Education: Faculty of Medicine, Federal University of Minas Gerais
- Occupation: Doctor

Francisco "Chico" de Assis Simões Thomaz (17 October 1950 – 6 July 2026) was a Brazilian politician. A member of the Workers' Party, he served in the Legislative Assembly of Minas Gerais from 2003 to 2005.

Simões died in Coronel Fabriciano on 6 July 2026, at the age of 75.
