= List of neighborhoods of Coronel Fabriciano =

This is a list of the 68 bairros (neighborhoods) and seven sectors of Coronel Fabriciano, Minas Gerais, Brazil.

== List ==
List of neighborhoods of Coronel Fabriciano by sector
Sectors	Neighborhoods	Images
1	Bela Vista • Centro • Manoel Domingos • Nazaré • Nossa Senhora do Carmo • Nossa Senhora da Penha • Professores • Santa Helena • Santa Terezinha • Todos os Santos	View of the downtown
2	Aparecida do Norte • Caladinho • Chacreamento Caladinho • Industrial Novo Reno • Jacinto das Neves • Lagoa da Mata • Morada do Vale • Pomar • Universitário • Vila Maria Linhares • Vila São Domingos • Vila São Francisco	Region of the Caladinho neighborhood
3	Aldeia do Lago • Amaro Lanari • Mangueiras • Ponte Nova • Santa Terezinha II	Amaro Lanari neighborhood
4	Alto Giovannini • Belvedere • Bom Jesus • Florença • Giovannini • Industrial • Júlia Kubitschek • Melo Viana • Nova Tijuca • Olaria • Recanto Verde • Santo Eloy • São Domingos • Vila Bom Jesus	Partial view of the Giovannini neighborhood
5	Córrego Alto • José da Silva Brito • Pedra Linda • Santa Cruz • Santa Inês • Santa Luzia • Santa Rita • São Geraldo • São Vicente • Sílvio Pereira I • Sílvio Pereira II	Region of the Santa Cruz neighborhood
6	Alipinho • Caladão • Chácaras Ouro Verde • Contente • Floresta • Frederico Ozanan • Gávea • Jardim Primavera • Judith Bhering • Manoel Maia • Maria Delfina Benevides • Potyra • Residencial Fazendinha • Santo Antônio • São Cristóvão • Surinan • Tranquilão	Surinan neighborhood
7	Rural zone (small villages)	São José dos Cocais village
