= Dom Joaquim =

Human settlement in Brazil

Coordinates: 18°57′S 43°16′W

- Municipality
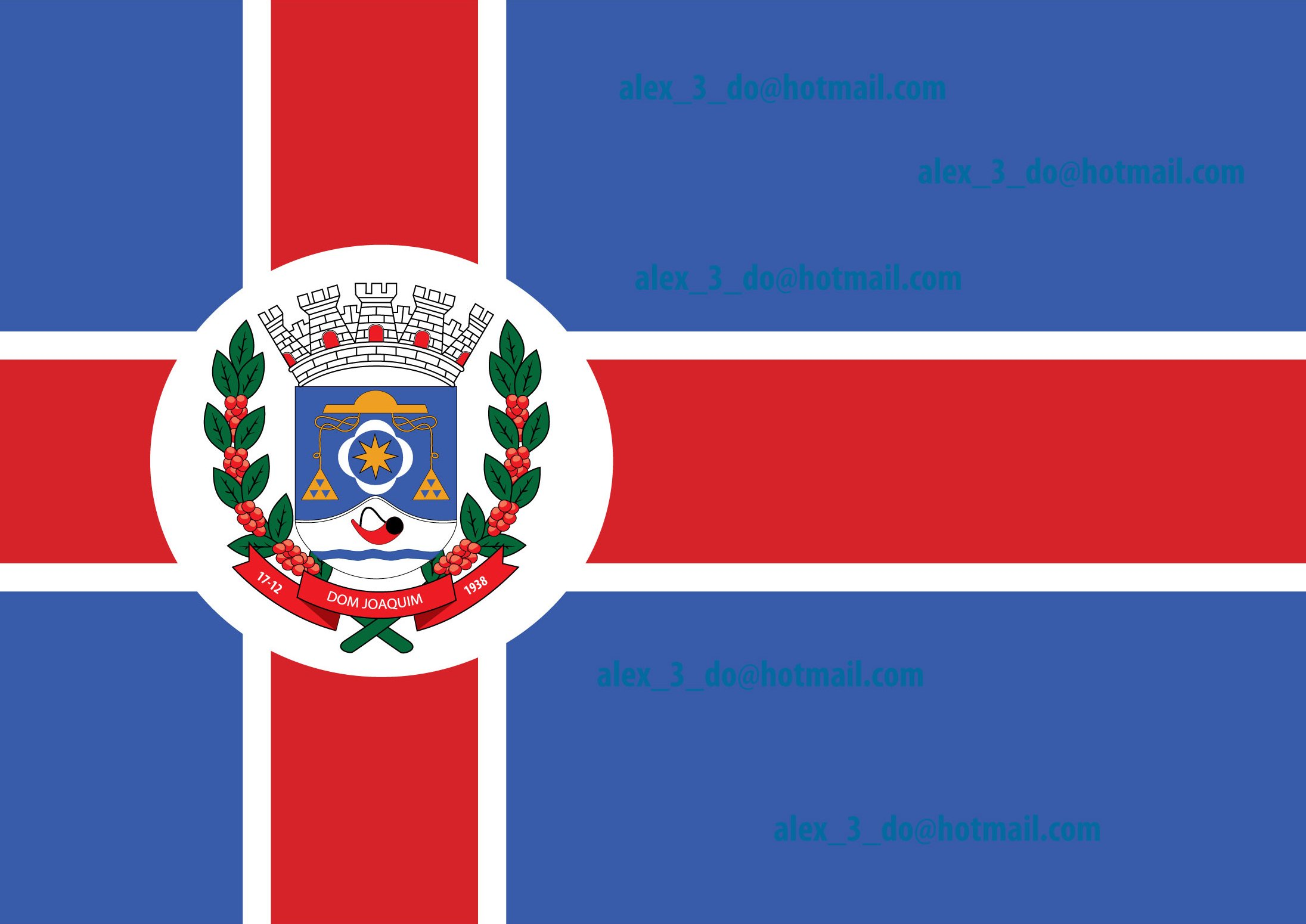
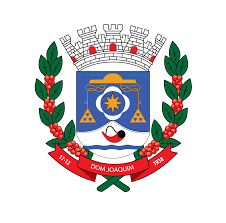
- Flag Coat of arms
- Interactive map of Dom Joaquim
- Country: Brazil
- State: Minas Gerais
- Region: Southeast

Population (2022 Census)
  - Total: 4,899
  - Estimate (2025): 5,074
- Time zone: UTC−3 (BRT)

Location of Dom Joaquim within Minas Gerais

Dom Joaquim is a Brazilian municipality in the state of Minas Gerais. The city belongs to the mesoregion of Belo Horizonte and to the microregion of Conceição do Mato Dentro.As of 2025, the estimated population was 5,074.

== See also ==
- List of municipalities in Minas Gerais
