= Floresta (Coronel Fabriciano) =

Brazilian neighborhood

- Neighborhood of Coronel Fabriciano
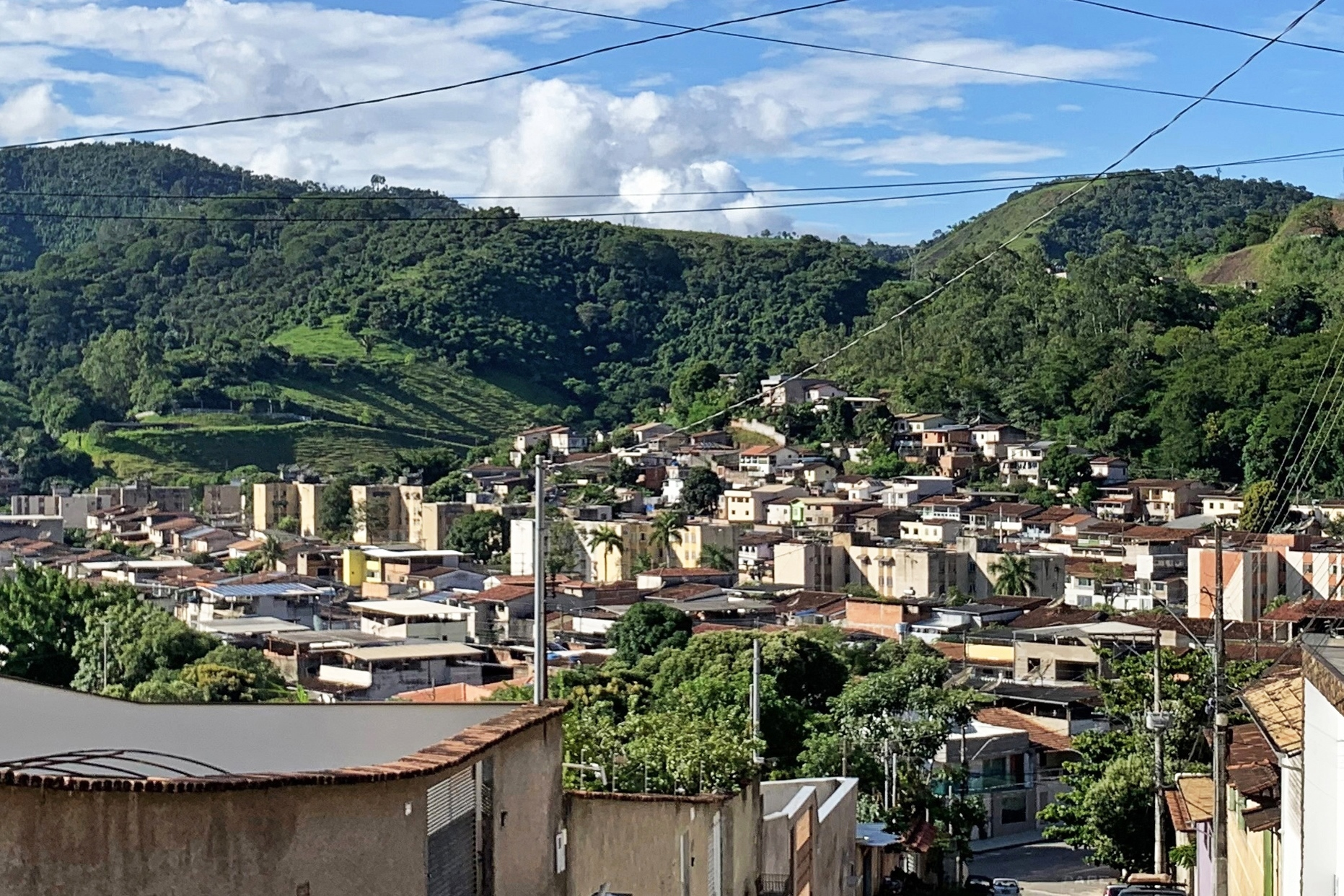
- View of the Floresta neighborhood

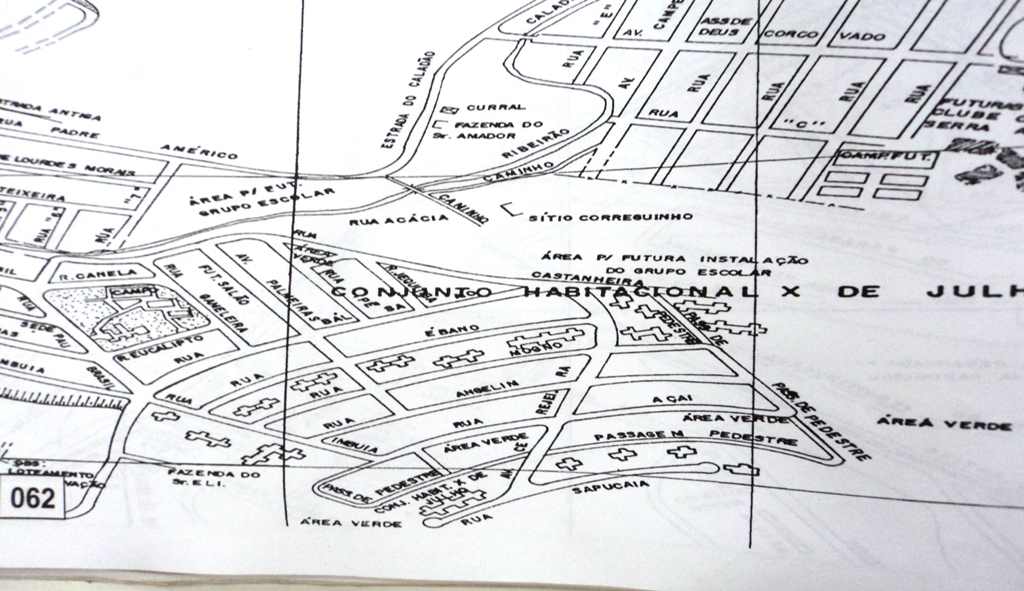
- Map of the Floresta neighborhood
- Coordinates: 19°29′07″S 42°37′52″W
- Country: Brazil
- State: Minas Gerais
- Municipality/City: Coronel Fabriciano
- Zone: Senador Melo Viana District

Area
  - Total: 0.4 km^{2} (0.15 sq mi)

Population
  - Total: 2,820
  - Density: 6.213/km^{2} (16.09/sq mi)

Floresta is a neighborhood in the Brazilian municipality of Coronel Fabriciano, in the interior of the state of Minas Gerais. It is located in the Senador Melo Viana district, in Sector 6. According to the Brazilian Institute of Geography and Statistics (IBGE), its population in 2010 was 2,820 inhabitants (2.7% of the municipality's total), distributed over an area of 0.4 km^{2}.

The neighborhood was created in 1983 with the construction of a housing complex sponsored by the Institute for the Guidance of Housing Cooperatives (Inocoop). It became one of the main commercial centers outside downtown Fabriciano, with a significant presence of bakeries, pharmacies and clothing stores.

== History ==
Originally, the land currently occupied by the neighborhood belonged to Salustiano Costa but was later used to build the housing complex sponsored by the Institute for the Guidance of Housing Cooperatives (Inocoop). Work was completed in January 1983, under the official provisional name of Dez de Julho Housing Complex.

A few months later, a bill proposed by former Councillor Helvécio Pinto changed the name to Floresta (officially Floresta Neighborhood Housing Estate), referring to the dense forest located to the west of the neighborhood. The Association of Residents of the Floresta Housing Estate (AMCHF) was created at the same time. The Floresta neighborhood became one of the main commercial hubs outside the city center.

== Geography and demography ==
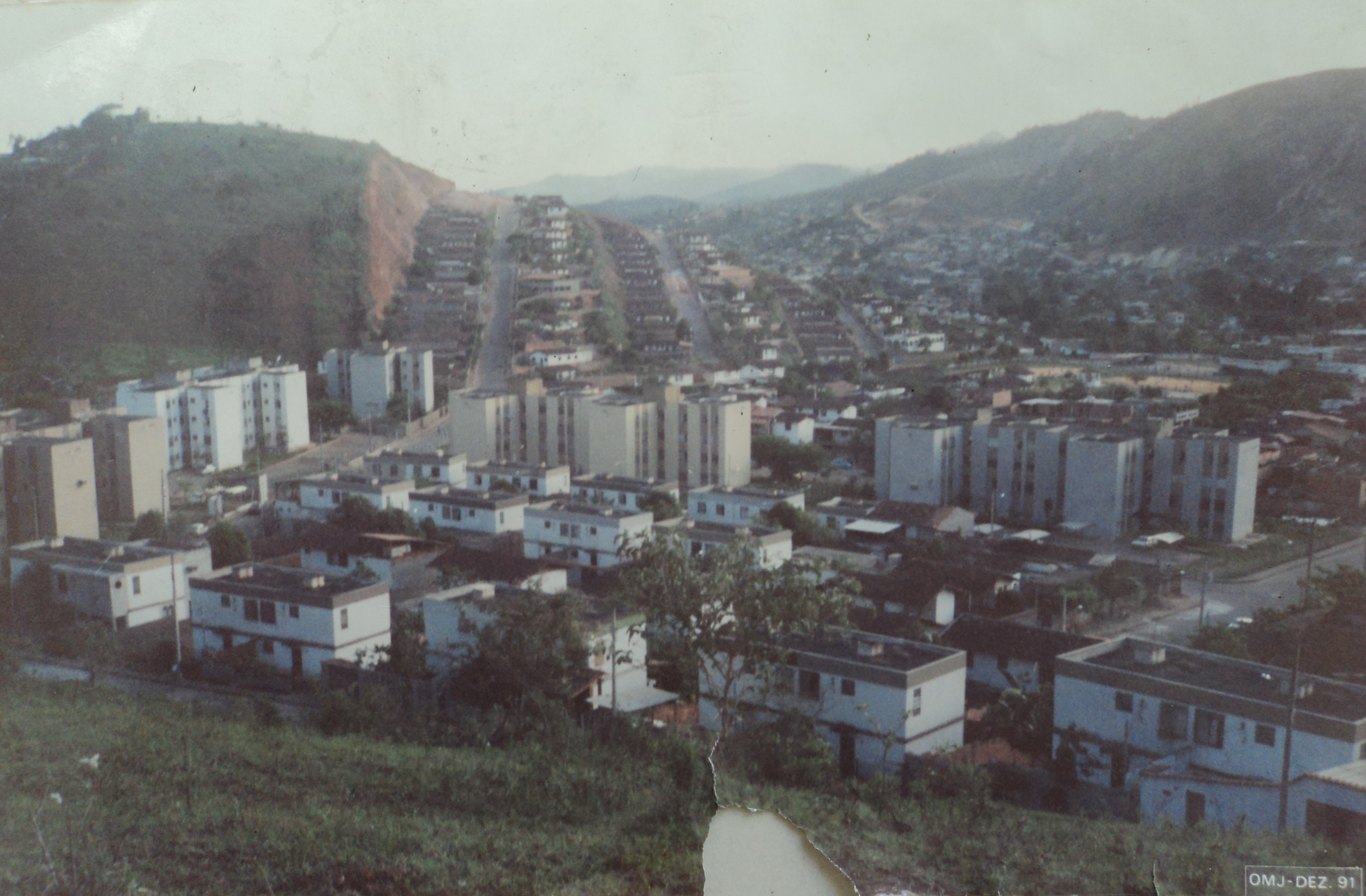
View of the Floresta neighborhood in 1991.

The Floresta neighborhood has a total area of 0.4 km^{2} and is bordered by the districts of Gávea (to the north), Residencial Fazendinha, Santo Antônio e Tranquilão (to the west), Surinan (to the south), São Geraldo, Santa Inês, José da Silva Brito (to the east) and Pedra Linda (to the northeast). It is bathed by the Caladão Stream, which cuts through the urban area of Fabriciano and presents pollution, siltation and erosion problems. The neighborhood is frequently affected by floods related to clogged drains in the lower parts, while landslides occur in areas on the edge of hillsides.

In 2010, the Brazilian Institute of Geography and Statistics (IBGE) estimated that 3 452 inhabitants lived in the neighborhood, which is comparable to cities in Minas Gerais such as Rio Doce and Carmésia. Among the neighborhoods in Fabriciano, Floresta ranked 13th among the most populous, comprising 2.7% of the municipal population and 5.1% of the population of the Senador Melo Viana district, with a population density of 6,213.04 inhabitants per square kilometer. Of the total number of inhabitants, 1,340 were men (47.5% of the total) and 1 480 women (52.5%), distributed in 987 households. Despite the prevalence of residential areas, Floresta is one of the main commercial centers outside the Centro with a considerable presence of bakeries, pharmacies and clothing stores. The Catholic pastoral work of the Community of Our Lady of Mercy, subordinate to the Parish of Saint Francis Xavier and under the jurisdiction of the Diocese of Itabira-Fabriciano, covers the neighborhoods of Gávea and Floresta.

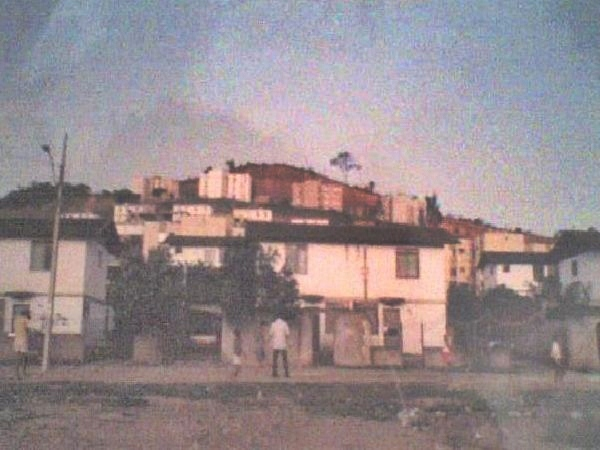
Houses of the Floresta neighborhood in 1991.

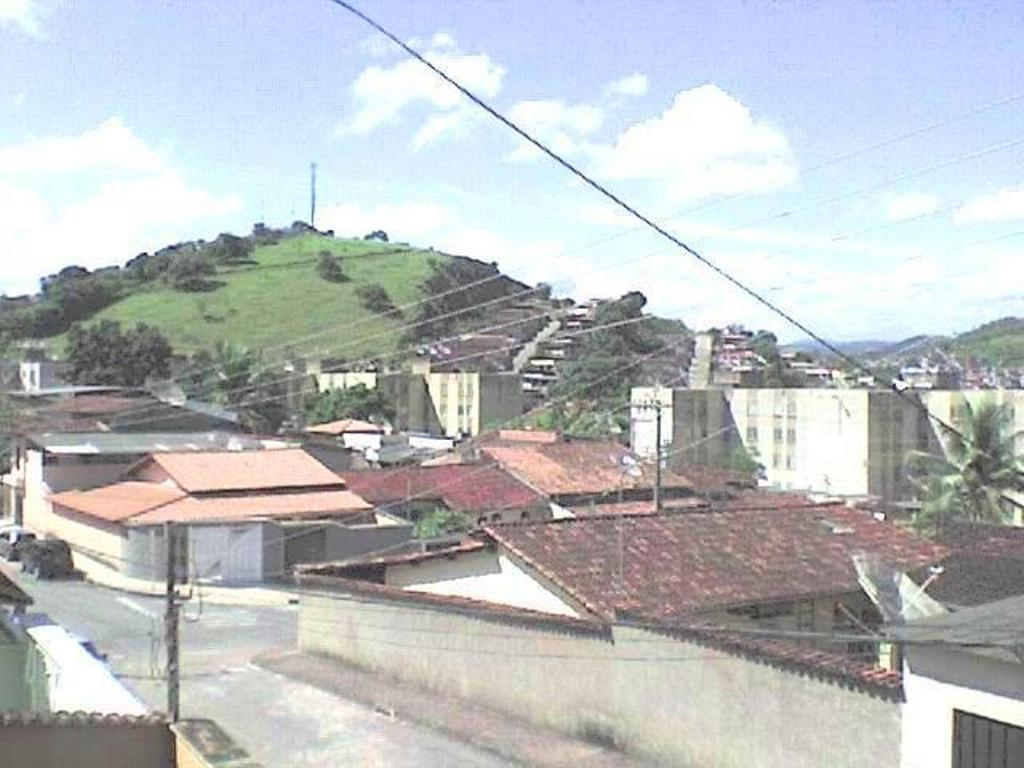
Partial view of the Floresta neighborhood seen from a balcony.

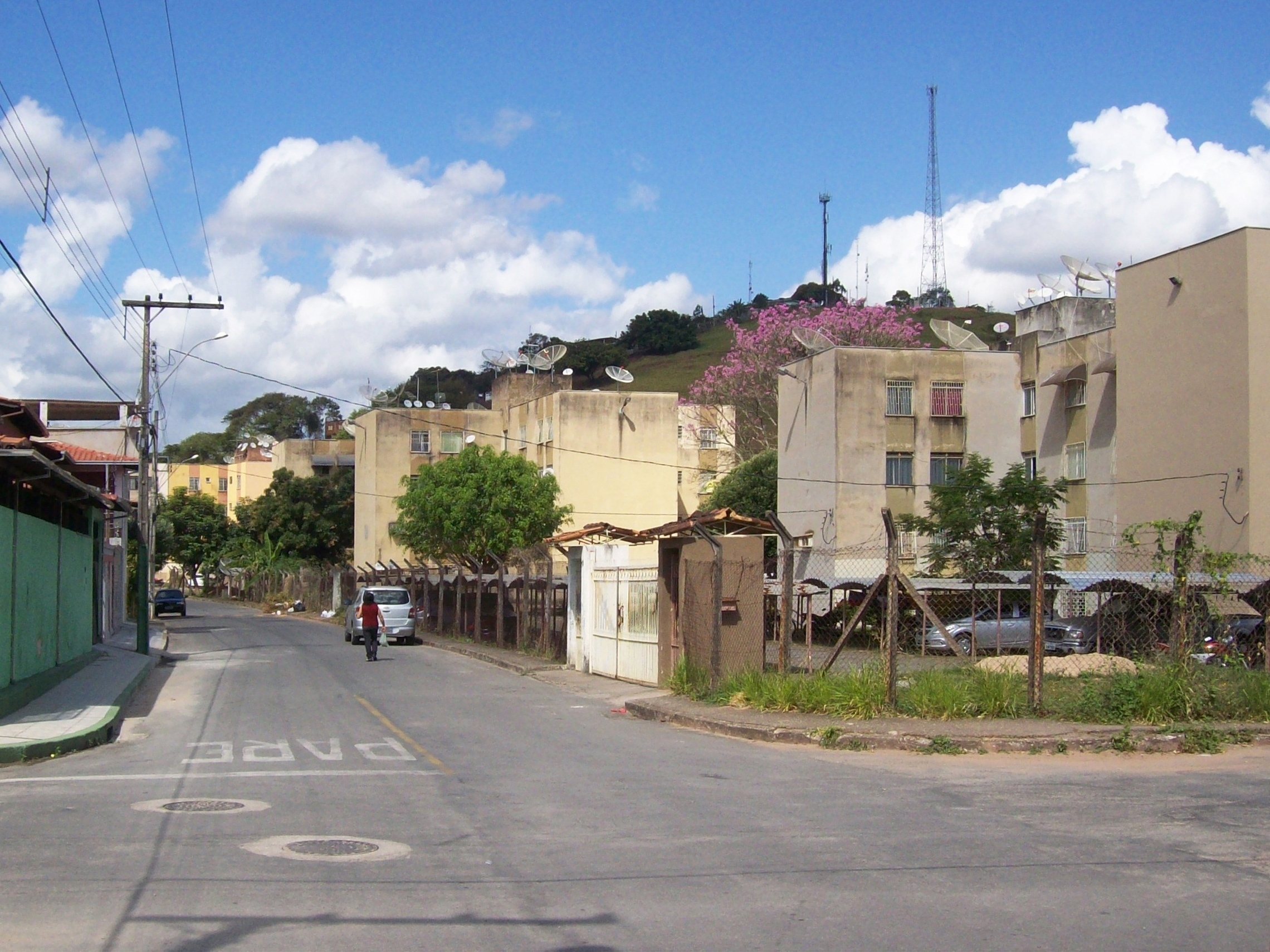
Houses and buildings in the Mogno Street.

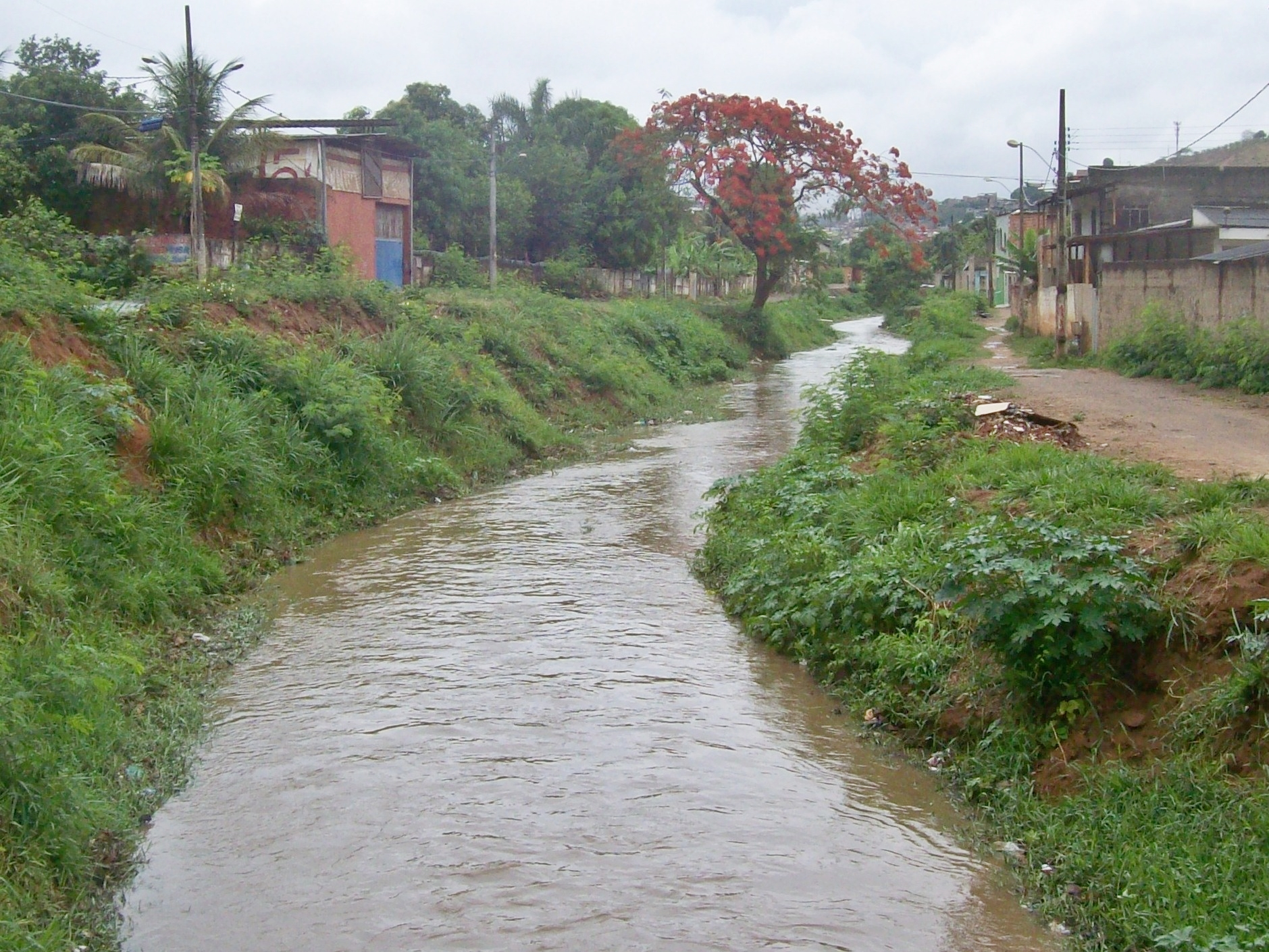
Caladão Stream between the Floresta and Tranquilão neighborhoods after a storm.

== Infrastructure and leisure ==
View of the Perlingeiro de Abreu State School.

According to the State Department of Education (SEE), the Floresta neighborhood had four educational institutions in August 2013: the Neves de Freitas Educational Institute (IENEF), better known as the Turma do Moranguinho Educational Center, which is private and provides preschool and primary school education (1st to 5th grade); the Rosa de Sarom Nursery School, a private center; the Doutor Perlingeiro de Abreu State School, which provides elementary (6th to 9th grade), secondary and adult education; and the headquarters of the Association of Parents and Friends of the Disabled (APAE) of Coronel Fabriciano. In 2011, the Doutor Perlingeiro de Abreu State School had a total of 1,600 students and 26 classes, supplying the demand from Floresta and neighboring districts.

Floresta has a basic care unit run by the Municipal Health Department, which offers basic care and consultations to the population and nursing services, as well as serving as a vaccination post during vaccination campaigns. The water supply is provided by Companhia de Saneamento de Minas Gerais (Copasa), while the electricity supply is provided by Companhia Energética de Minas Gerais (Cemig), with 100% of the population having access to the electricity network. It has a Community Police Station (PPC) maintained by the Military Police, but there are frequent incidents of robberies in commercial establishments. There are municipal public transport bus lines that serve the neighborhood directly.

The Urban Social Center in the Floresta neighborhood, located in an area belonging to the Residents' Association (AMCHF), has leisure facilities and a sports court. Events to celebrate June festivals, Children's Day, Christmas and the neighbourhood's birthday are organized. The Social Center hosts fairs, musical shows, cultural events and sports championships.

Health center of the Floresta neighborhood.

View of the Jardim das Palmeiras Square.

View of the Leôncio Arantes Pitch.

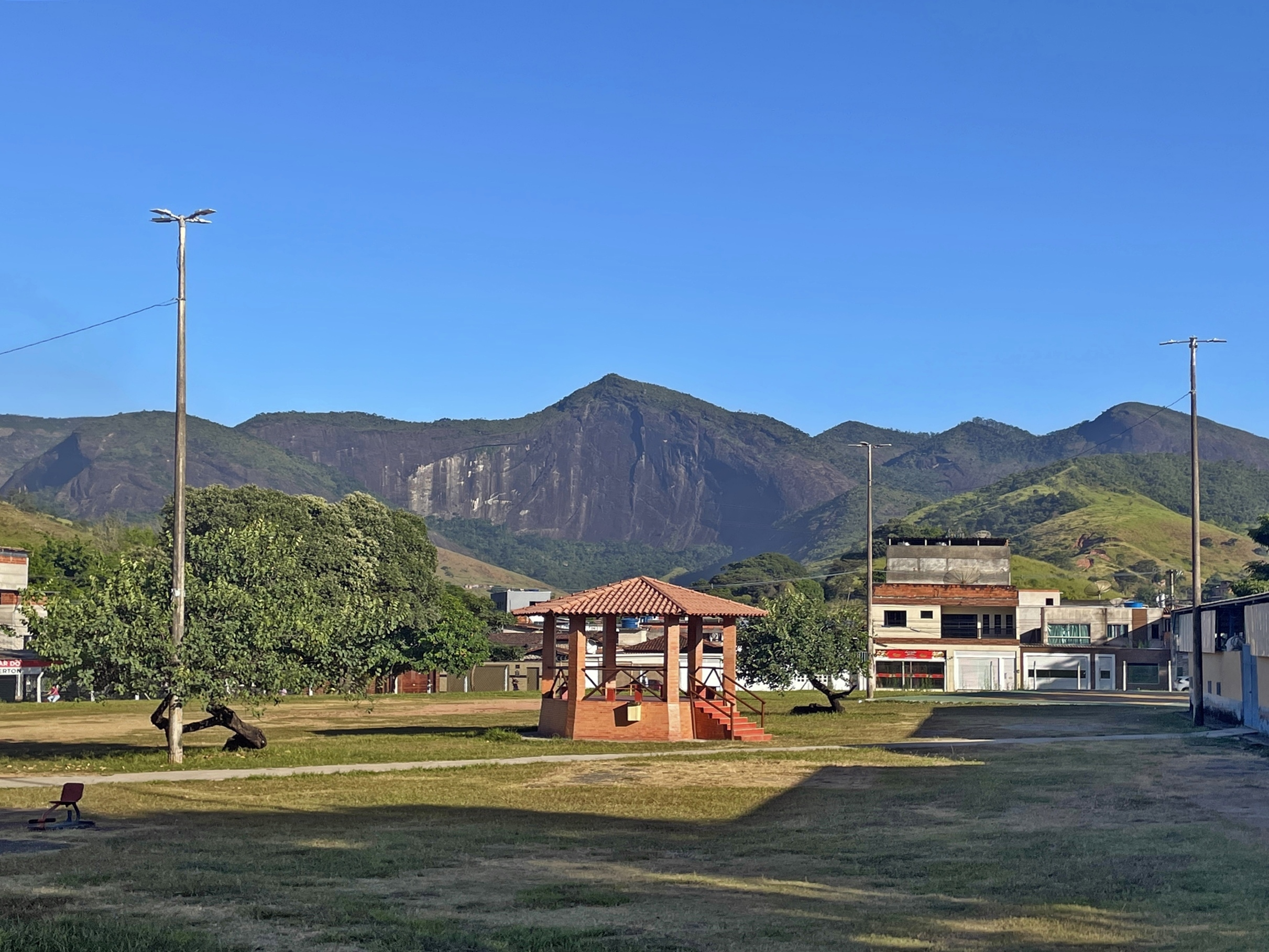
Partial view of the social center of the Floresta neighborhood.

== See also ==
- List of neighborhoods of Coronel Fabriciano
- History of Coronel Fabriciano
