= Centro (Coronel Fabriciano) =

Brazilian neighborhood

Centro Downtown, Center
- Neighborhood of Coronel Fabriciano
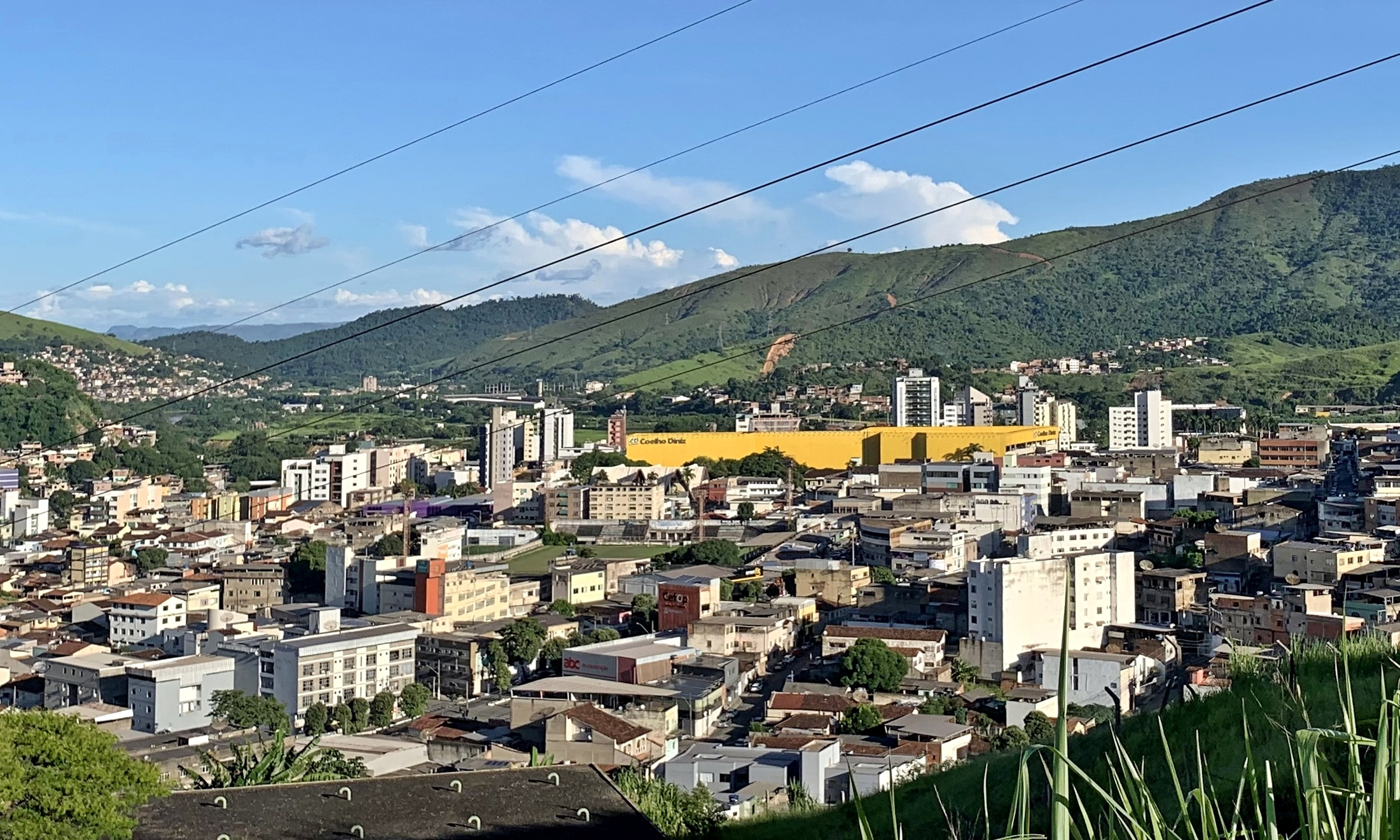
- Partial view

- Location in Minas Gerais Centro (Brazil)
- Coordinates: 19°31′39″S 42°37′30″W
- Country: Brazil
- State: Minas Gerais
- Municipality/City: Coronel Fabriciano
- Zone: Headquarters district

Area
  - Total: 0.6 km^{2} (0.23 sq mi)

Population
  - Total: 2 799
  - Density: 4.996/km^{2} (12.94/sq mi)

Centro (English: Downtown; lit. Center) is a neighborhood in the Brazilian municipality of Coronel Fabriciano, in the interior of the state of Minas Gerais. It is located in the headquarters district, in Sector 1. According to the Brazilian Institute of Geography and Statistics (IBGE), its population in 2010 was 2,799 inhabitants (2.8% of the municipality's total), distributed over an area of 0.6 km^{2}.

The settlement of the central region of the city began with the construction of the Vitória-Minas Railway and the Calado Station in the 1910s and 1920s. Commercial activity started around the terminal, demolished in 1979, where the current Pedro Nolasco Street was built. The installation of the Acesita (now Aperam South America) and Usiminas industrial complexes, located in the neighboring municipalities of Timóteo and Ipatinga, respectively, favored urban development and boosted commercial importance.

The Centro, where 70% of the income from the sales sector in Fabriciano comes from, is one of the main commercial centers of the Vale do Aço Metropolitan Region (RMVA). The neighborhood includes the City Hall and the Bus Terminal. It also houses several monuments of cultural and historical importance, such as the Mother Church of Saint Sebastian, Colégio Angélica, Sobrado dos Pereira and Estação Square.

== History ==
=== Settlement ===
The settlement of the current Centro began at the end of the 1910s with the resumption of construction of the Vitória-Minas Railroad (EFVM), interrupted in Belo Oriente. The area was known as Barra do Calado, as it was located near the mouth of the Caladão Stream on the Piracicaba River, where goods and people were shipped to neighboring settlements. At the time, dozens of tents were improvised to shelter the railroad workers.

The town known as Calado developed around the railroad under construction and the Calado Station, inaugurated near the left bank of the Piracicaba River in 1924. Next to the terminal, Rua de Baixo (English: Lower Street), now Pedro Nolasco and Coronel Silvino Pereira streets, was established and the first stores were built. By the end of the 1920s, Calado was made up of Rua de Baixo and Rua de Cima (English: Upper Street), now Doutor Querubino Street.

In 1928, Sobrado dos Pereira, the first masonry building in the town besides the railway terminal, was built on the then Rua de Baixo and housed the first commercial establishment. The first church, dedicated to Saint Sebastian, was built in 1929 on the site of the current Parish Hall. Associated with the presence of the railway station, Rua de Baixo became the town's main commercial center, favored by the four daily stops of EFVM passenger trains, which brought consumers from other cities every day.

=== Administrative consolidation ===
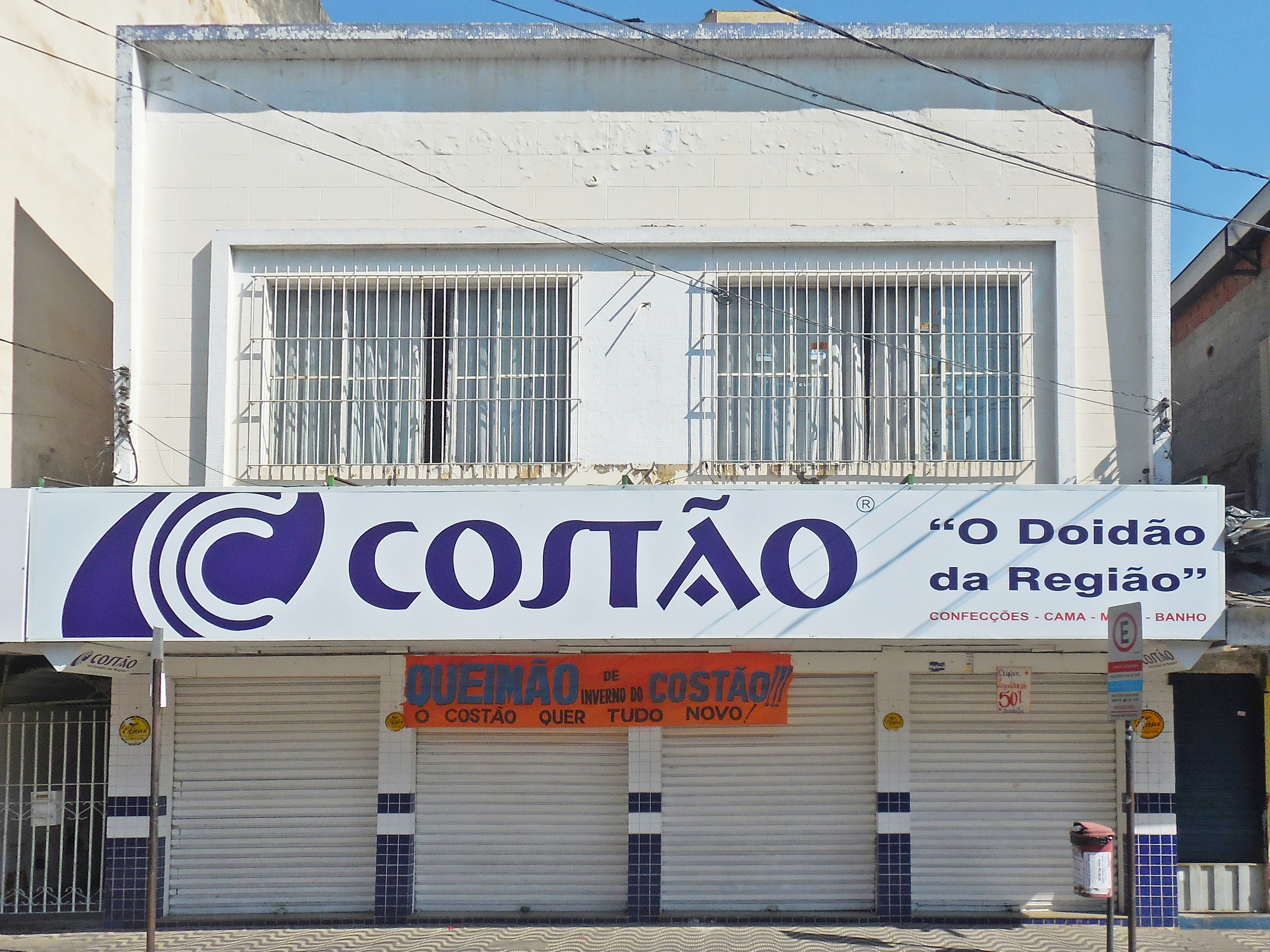
Facade of the Costão in the Casa São Geraldo.

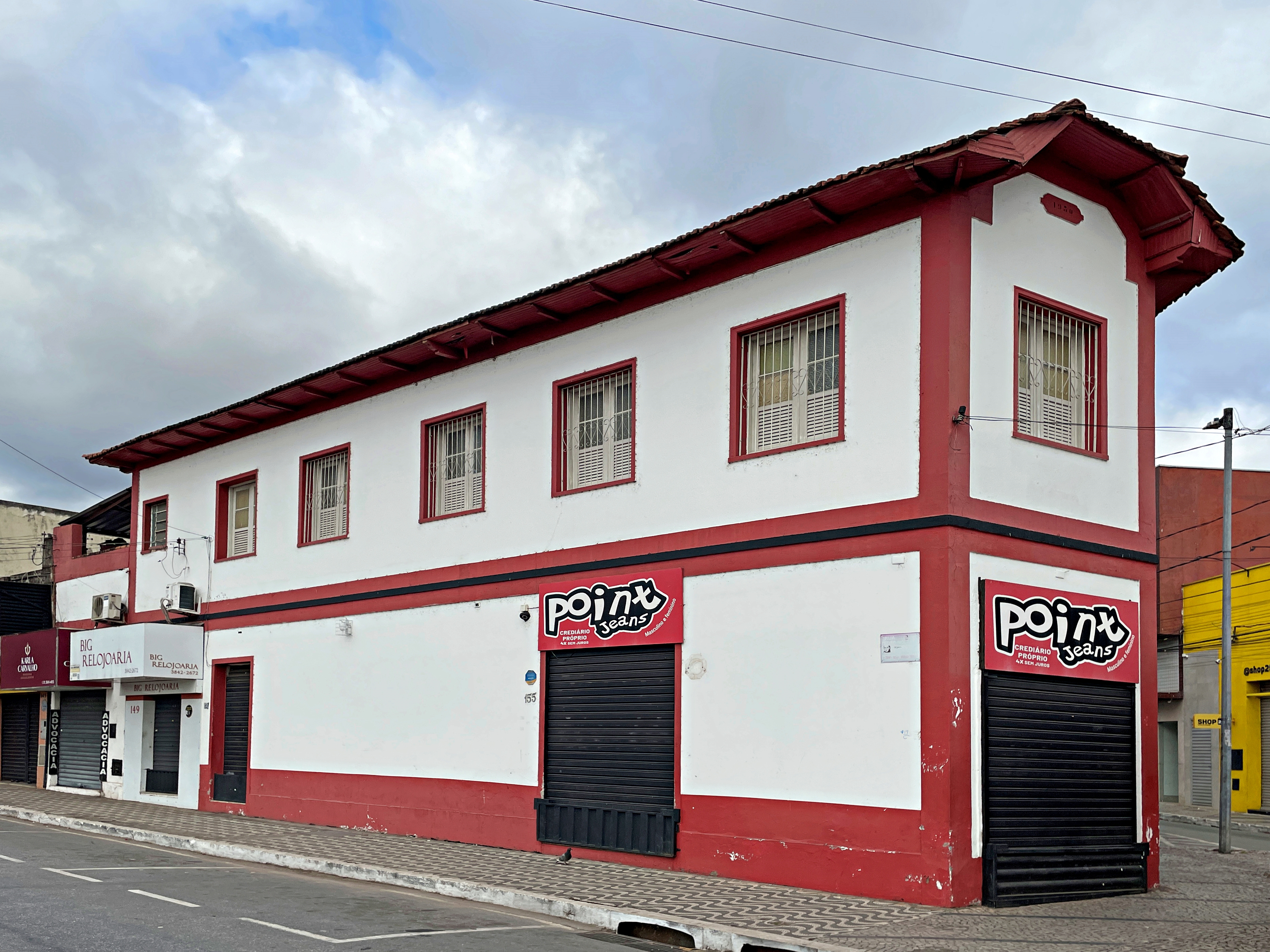
Sobrado dos Pereira.

The seat of the then Melo Viana district, subordinate to Antônio Dias, was transferred to Calado in 1933, due to the long distance traveled by clerk José Zacarias Roque between the notary's office in the current Melo Viana district and the railway terminal. In 1936, an office of the Companhia Siderúrgica Belgo-Mineira was established to centralize logging and coal production in the Doce River Valley region, which resulted in demographic and structural growth. The company was responsible for the construction of several masonry houses and the opening up of streets, as well as the construction of the old Siderúrgica Hospital nearby.

Later, other establishments were built, such as: the EFVM administrative unit; the Sete de Setembro Club, the city's first nightclub; and the Banco da Lavoura, the first bank branch. Coronel Fabriciano was emancipated in 1948, and the first mayor, Rubem Siqueira Maia, was responsible for setting up the Professor Pedro Calmon State School (the city's first school building), structuring the public electricity supply and paving the city center. He also donated the Casa São Geraldo, which he owned and built in 1948, to serve as the City Hall's first headquarters.

The installation of the Usiminas and Acesita (now Aperam South America) industrial complexes also favored urban development, but with the political emancipation of Ipatinga and Timóteo in the 1960s, the companies became part of these municipalities, respectively. Trade and services became the main economic sources in Coronel Fabriciano. Belgo-Mineira operated on the site until the 1960s due to the scarcity of wood.

=== Urban consolidation ===
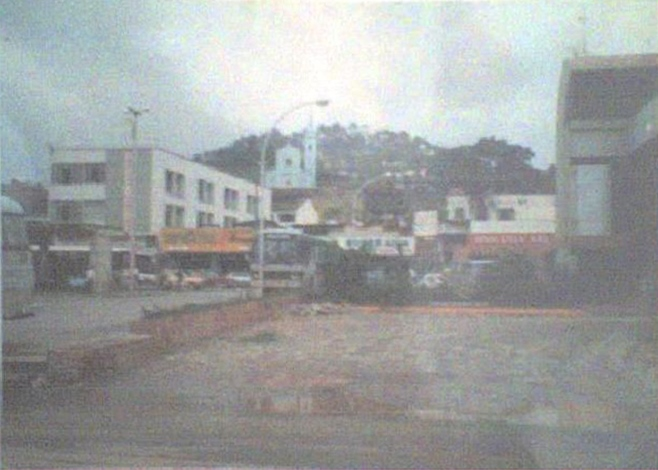
Downtown of Coronel Fabriciano in 1991.

Located between the railway terminal and the commercial center, Pedro Nolasco Street became the main bus stop for urban and interurban public transport. In the 1950s and 1960s, important buildings were built, such as the Colégio Angélica, the Cine Marrocos and the Silvana Palace Hotel. In the 1970s, the first large building, the ten-storey Vale Verde, was built on José Cornélio Street, and the Santa Helena neighborhood was created, where the old Santa Helena Sawmill operated. At the time, it was considered the most modern and upmarket residential district in the city due to its proximity to the city downtown.

Between the 1960s and the 1980s, the Centro also hosted several bars and restaurants that attracted workers from the region's steel mills. After the 1990s, there was a considerable reduction in the number of night-time visitors, who moved from the Centro to Magalhães Pinto Avenue. There are also cinemas, such as Cine Glória, built in the 1950s in the current Moacir Birro Street but replaced by Cine Marrocos in 1963, which had 1,300 seats and operated until the end of the 1980s.

The old Calado Station was deactivated in 1979 and demolished in 1982. It was replaced by the Bus Terminal and the urban transport interchange, which was moved to another location in the Centro in 2008 to provide space for the Estação Square. At the end of the 1980s, the paving of the main streets in the Centro was renovated through the Arglurb Project; the old stone pavement was replaced with hexagonal blocks. Between the 1980s and 1990s, the commercial activity rose, especially in the area around Maria Mattos Street, reinforcing the importance of the business center. A verticalization process began in the 1990s, as there was a limited number of vacant lots in the Centro and nearby neighborhoods. At the end of 2021, the main streets in the center were paved. The old blocks were used to pave roads in the Serra dos Cocais.

== Geography and demography ==
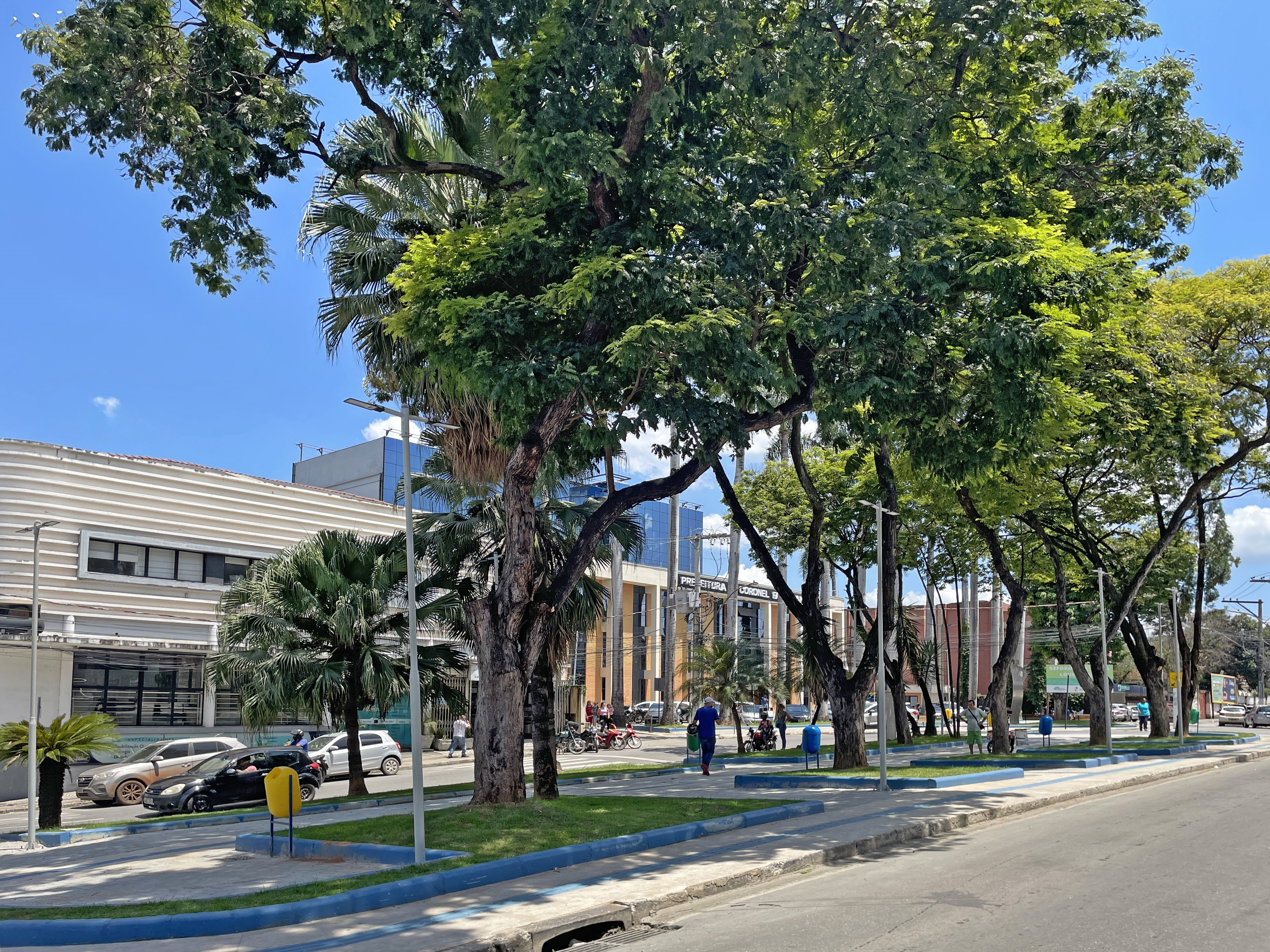
View of the Louis Ensch Square.

The Centro neighborhood has a total area of 0.6 km^{2} and is bordered by the neighborhoods of Giovannini (to the north), Nazaré (northwest), Nossa Senhora do Carmo, Nossa Senhora da Penha (west), Santa Helena and Professores (east) and the municipality of Timóteo (to the south), which is accessed by the Mariano Pires Pontes Bridge. It is situated at an average altitude of 250 meters.

In 2010, the Brazilian Institute of Geography and Statistics (IBGE) estimated that 2,799 inhabitants lived in the neighborhood, which is comparable to cities in Minas Gerais such as Rio Doce and Carmésia. Among the 63 neighborhoods in Fabriciano, Centro ranked 14th in terms of population, comprising 2.8% of the municipal population and 5.7% of the population of the headquarters district, with a population density of 4,966.51 inhabitants per square kilometer. Of the total number of inhabitants, 1,283 were men (45,8% of the total) and 1,516 women (54.2%), distributed in 1,135 households. The Mother Church of Saint Sebastian is the headquarters of the local Catholic community and of the Parish of Saint Sebastian, which is under the jurisdiction of the Diocese of Itabira-Fabriciano. The Residence of the Redemptorist Missionaries of Coronel Fabriciano houses the administrative headquarters of the parish.

The Piracicaba River divides the Centro neighborhood from the municipality of Timóteo. One of the city's informal settlements, known as Dom Helvécio or Prainha, is located on the banks of the river, in a lower part of the Centro. According to the IBGE, the settlement had around 326 inhabitants in 2010. In the rainy season, the level of the Piracicaba River rises and floods the streets of Prainha. The urban fabric and the sparse tree-planting increase the thermal sensation in most of the streets and in Estação Square on sunny days.

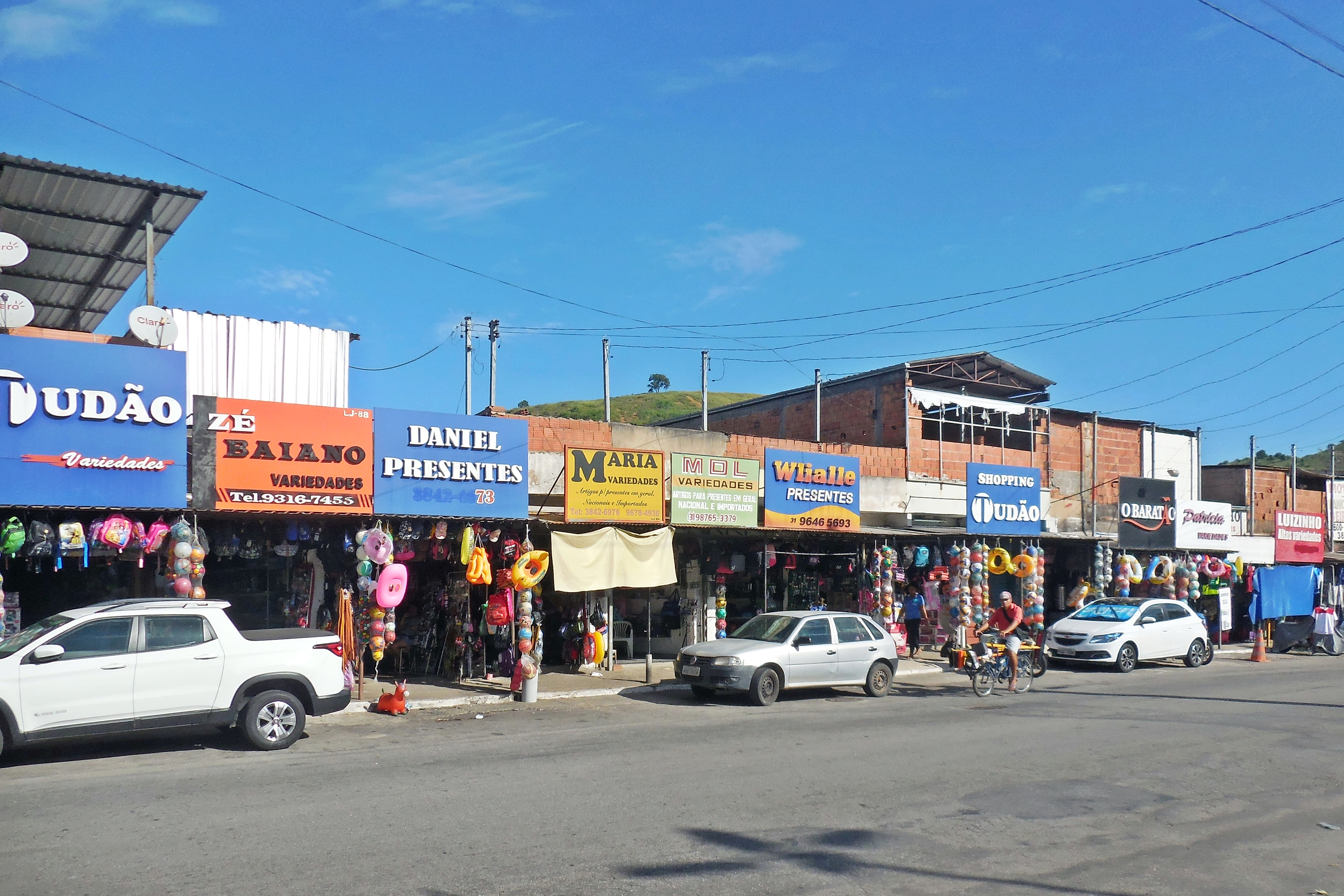
Small vendors in the downtown of Coronel Fabriciano.

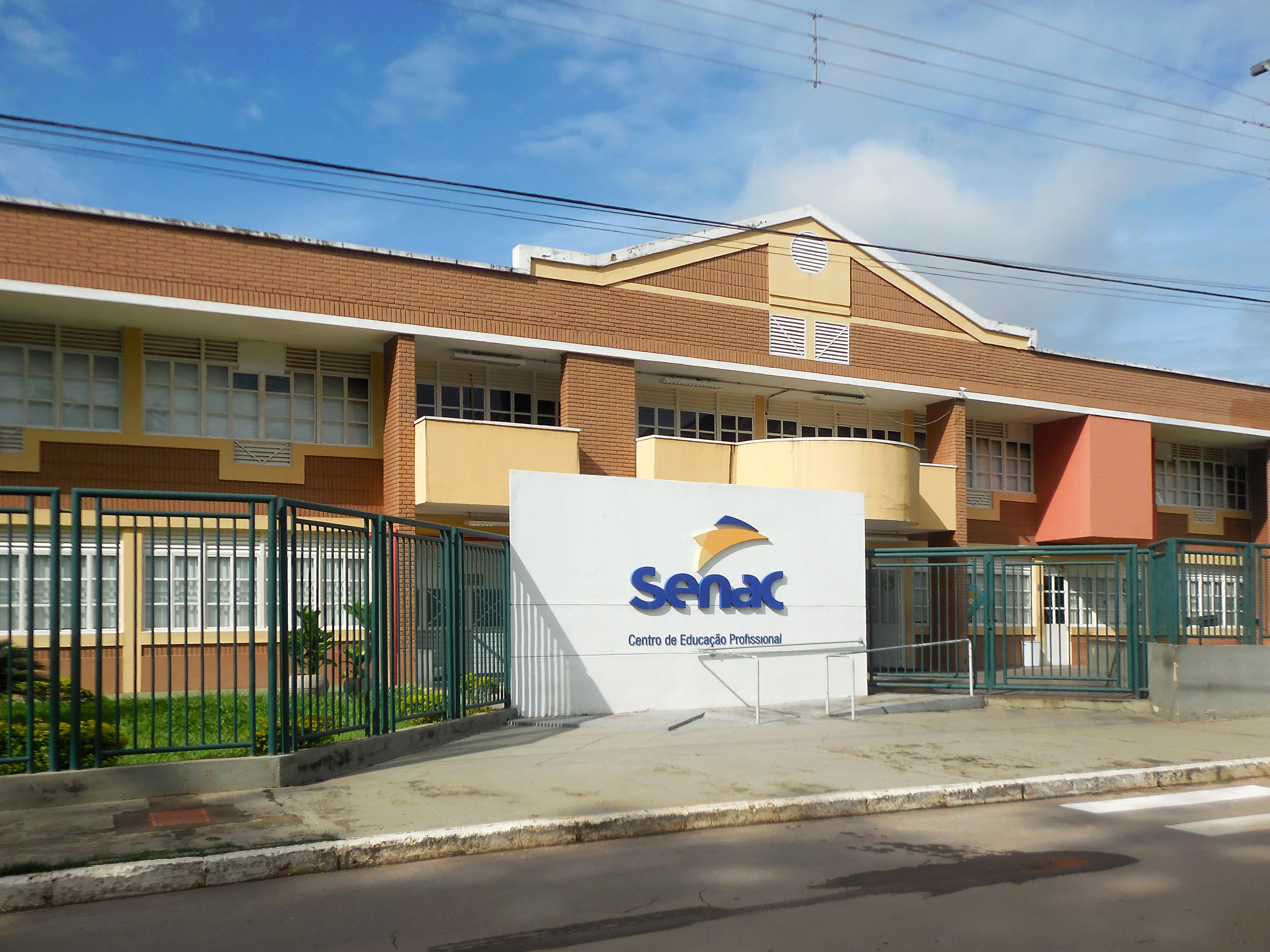
Head office of the Serviço Nacional de Aprendizagem Comercial (SENAC).

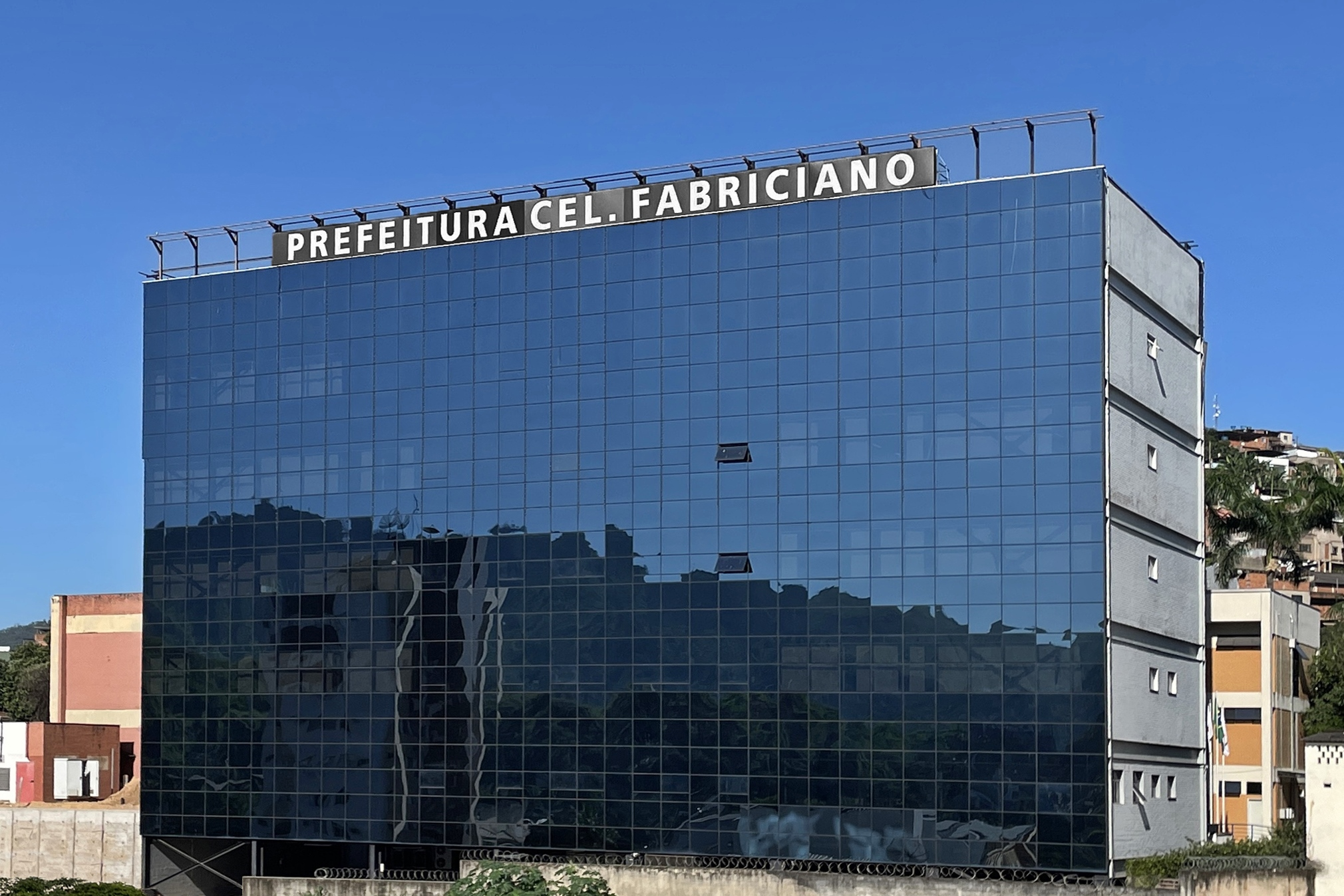
View of the Coronel Fabriciano City Hall.

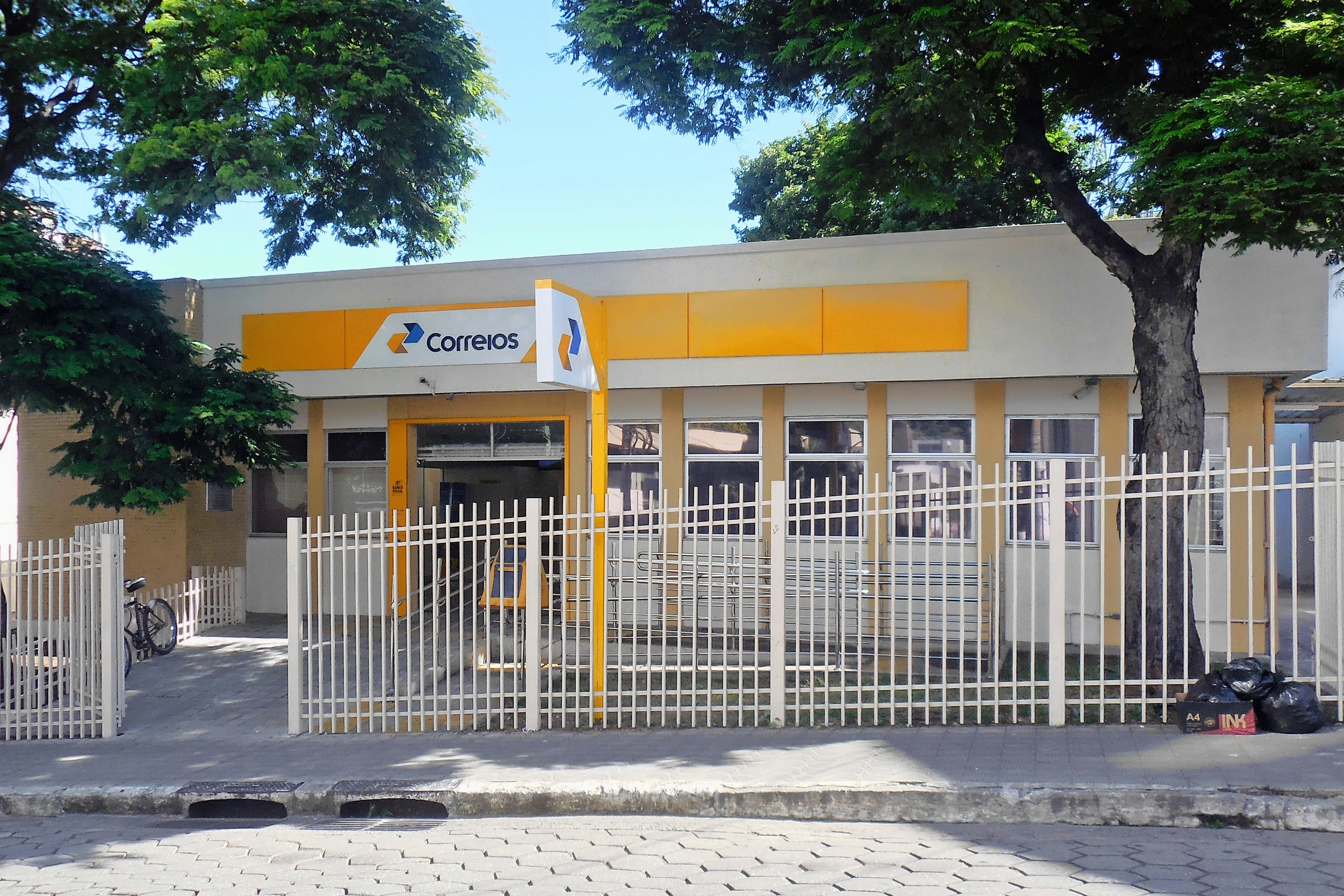
Post office of the Correios.

== Economy and infrastructure ==
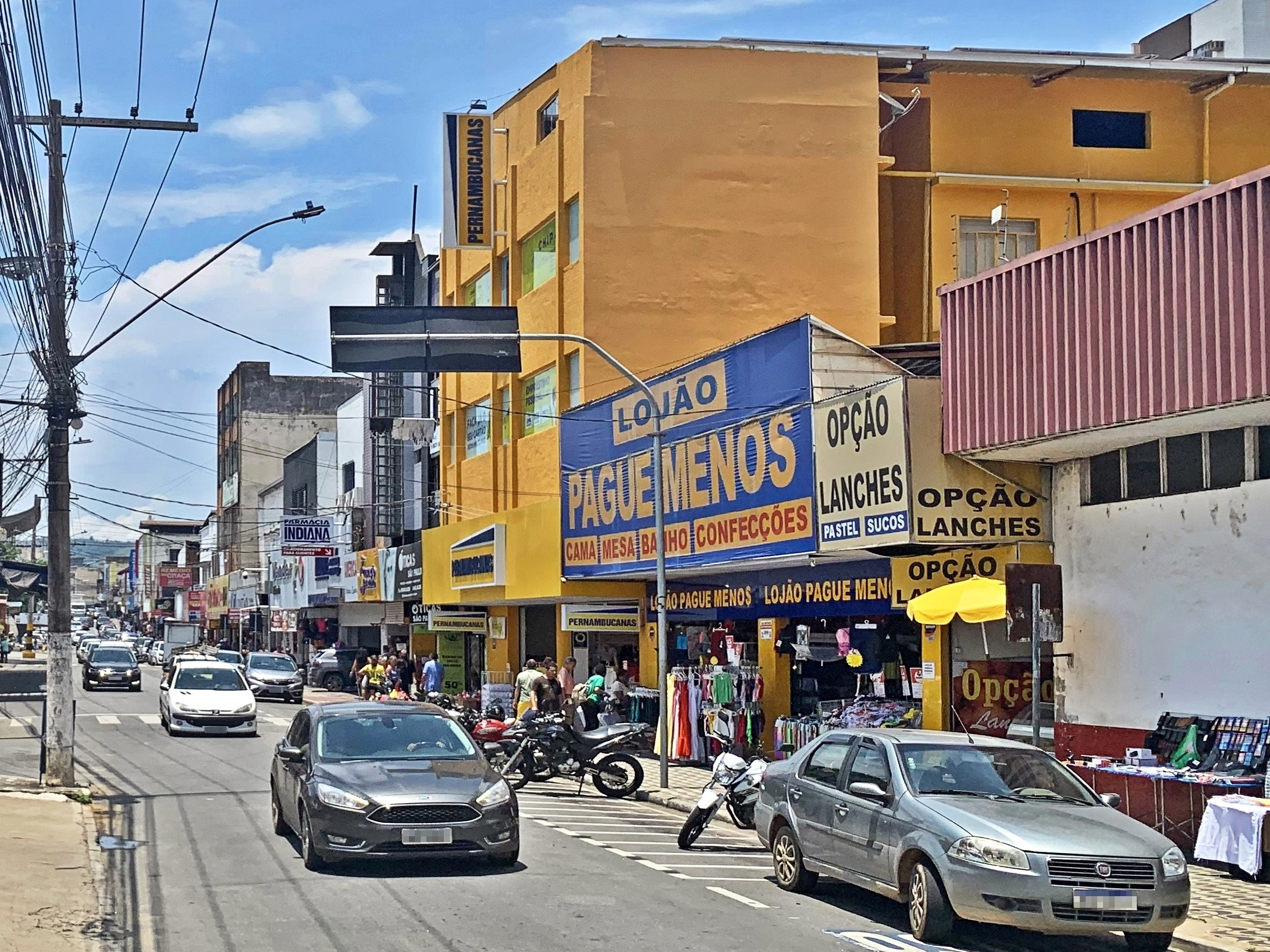
Trade on Pedro Nolasco Street

The Centro represents 70% of the city's total sales revenue, but there are few areas available for construction and rental. As a result, the neighborhood and surrounding areas are highly valued by the real estate sector. Pedro Nolasco Street is the main business alley.

The neighborhood includes the main educational institutions in the city, with both public and private schools offering preschool, basic and secondary education. The Serviço Nacional de Aprendizagem Comercial (SENAC), which offers professional education, is also located in the area. The neighborhood houses the City Hall, the regional headquarters of the Order of Attorneys of Brazil (OAB) and one of the city's branches of the Correios, which also serves nearby districts. The water supply is provided by Companhia de Saneamento de Minas Gerais (Copasa), while the electricity supply is provided by Companhia Energética de Minas Gerais (Cemig). Basic sanitation is precarious in some parts of Prainha, with inadequate sewage connections and waste being dumped in the Piracicaba River.

The Coronel Fabriciano Bus Terminal was built in 1988 on the site of the Calado Station, which was closed down in 1979. The neighborhood has municipal public transport lines to the entire city. Governador José de Magalhães Pinto Avenue connects the Centro to the neighborhoods of the Senador Melo Viana district, the most populous region of the municipality. The Pastor Pimentel Interchange, which represents the boundary between the central region and Giovannini, is the junction of Magalhães Pinto and Presidente Tancredo de Almeida Neves avenues.

== Culture ==
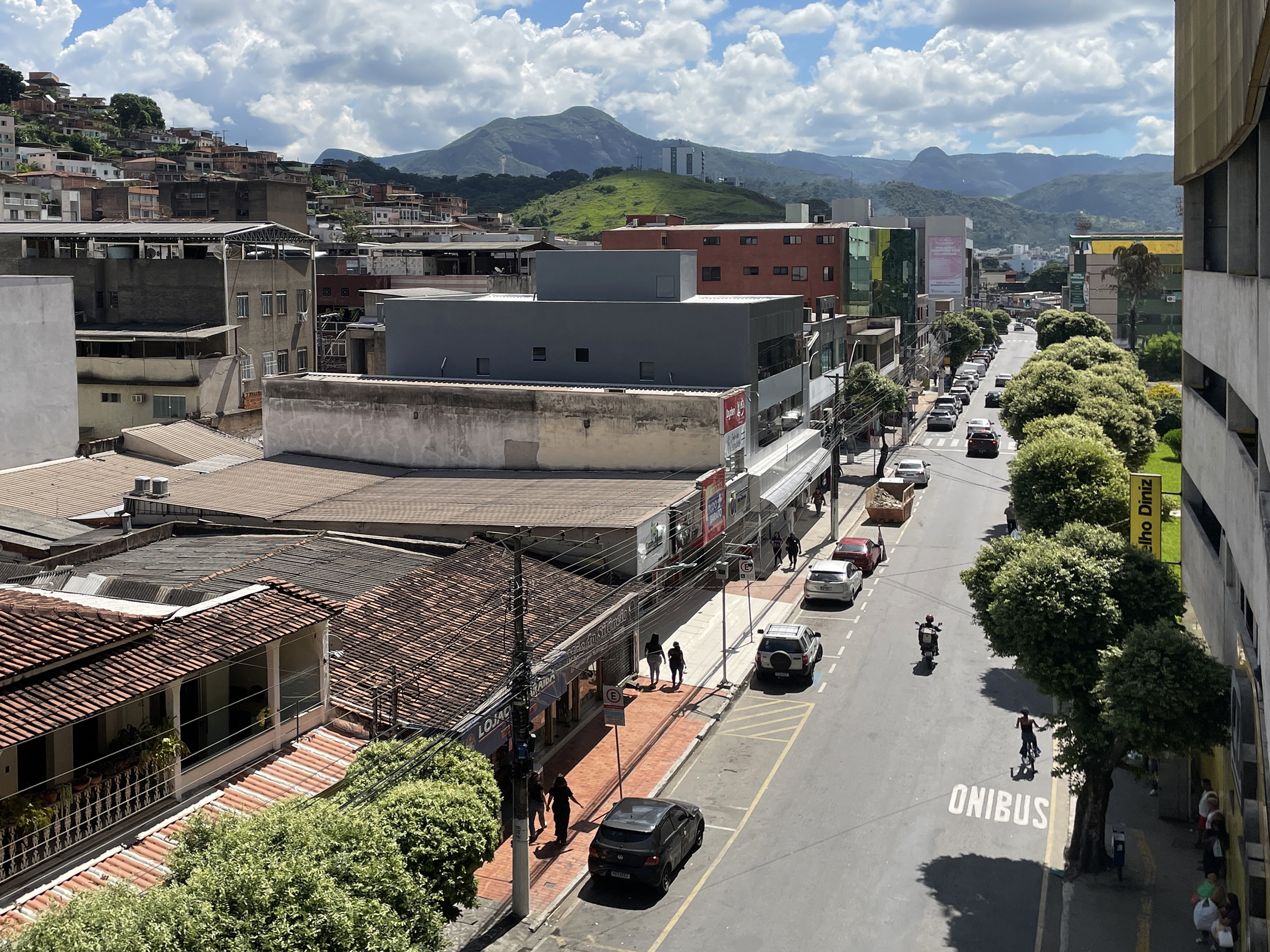
View of the Maria Mattos Street seen from the Coelho Diniz Supermarket.

The Centro houses several monuments of cultural and historical magnitude, including some listed as municipal cultural heritage or inventoried by the City Hall. One of the oldest religious buildings in the Vale do Aço Metropolitan Region is the Mother Church of Saint Sebastian, inaugurated in 1949 to replace the old one, which was about to collapse. The Parish Hall, a venue for activities and events for the parish and the city, opened in 1959 and is located in front of the temple. Sobrado dos Pereira was the first commercial establishment and the first masonry building in the municipality after Calado Station. The Colégio Angélica was created in 1950 and retains the original design on its facade. The Professor Pedro Calmon State School is the oldest school building in Coronel Fabriciano.

The neighborhood preserves some of the city's oldest buildings. Casa São Geraldo, Sobrado do Rotildino Avelino and CVRD's Casa Modelo, dating from the late 1960s, are located in Pedro Nolasco Street. The Sobrado do Armazém, which functioned as the City Hall headquarters in the 1960s, stands in Coronel Silvino Pereira Street. The House and Pharmacy of Raimundo Alves, in Pedro Messina Street, dates from 1950 and was the residence of Raimundo Alves de Carvalho, a former mayor and the first pharmacist to live in the municipality. The former Silvana Palace Hotel, located on José Cornélio Street, opened in 1962 and was considered the most luxurious hotel in the city at the time. After being closed down in 1985, it continued to be used as a commercial center.

Located at the Pastor Pimentel Interchange, the Terra Mãe Monument was built in the 1990s in honor of the 50th anniversary of Coronel Fabriciano's political emancipation. Estação Square, located between Pedro Nolasco Street and Rubem Siqueira Maia Avenue, can accommodate up to 15,000 people and was built in 2008 on the site of the city's urban terminal. Louis Ensch Square has a tree-lined area in front of the João Sotero Bragança Building, the former city hall, and the Monument to Human Rights, erected in 1999. JK Square, inaugurated on December 21, 2010, is named after former president Juscelino Kubitschek. There used to be a bust of the politician, which disappeared in the 1960s.

Facade of the Professor Pedro Calmon State School.

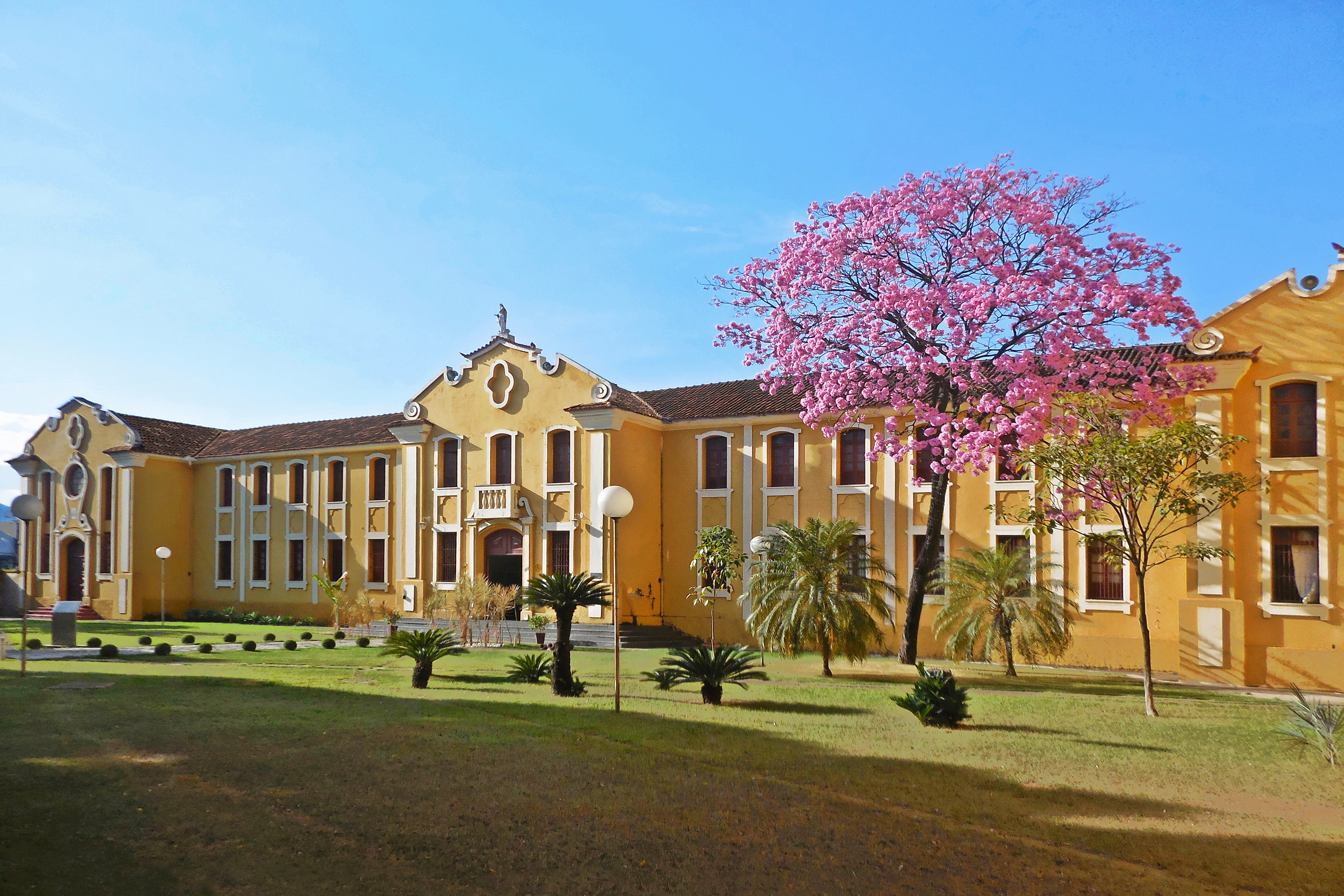
Facade of the Colégio Angélica.

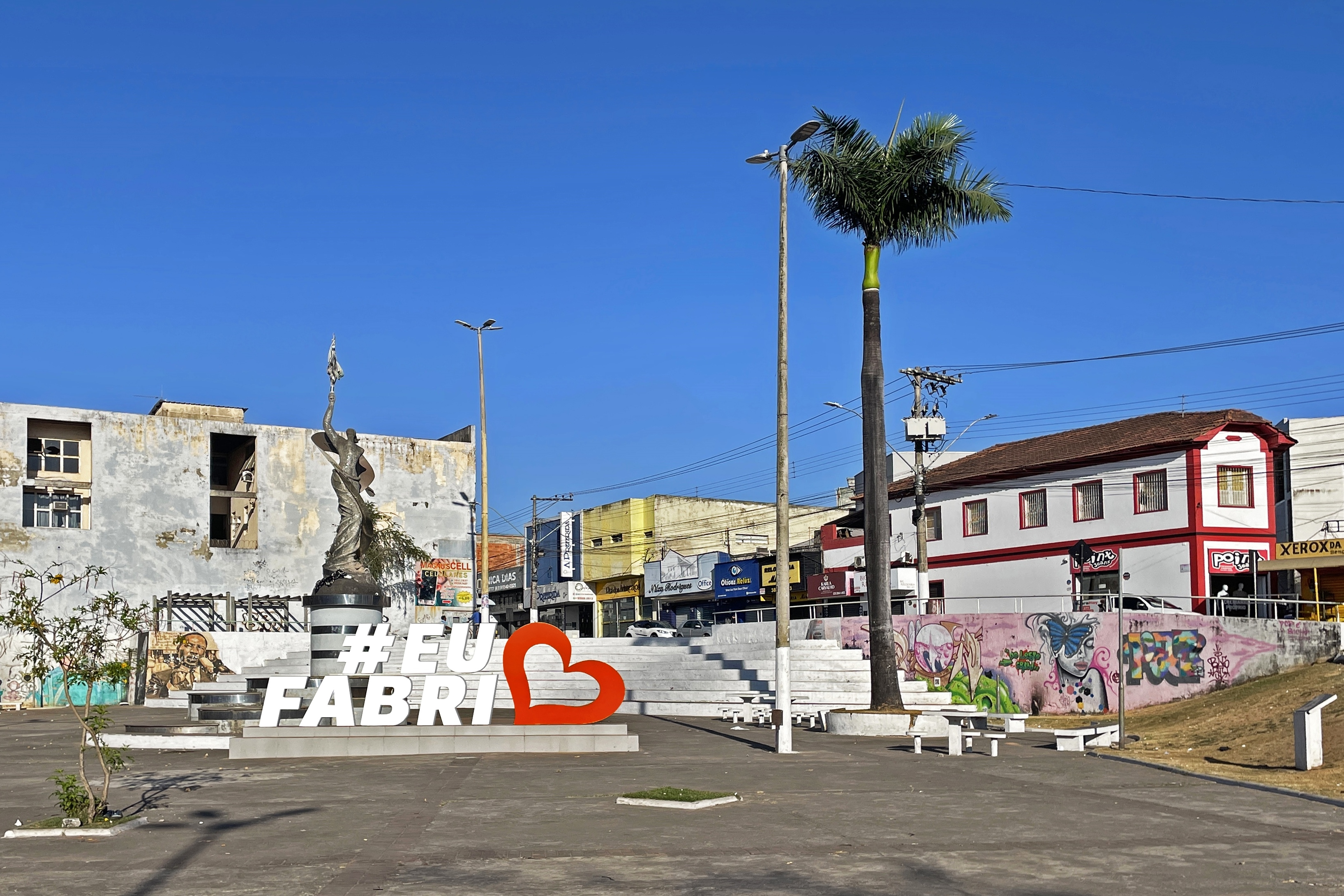
Estação Square.

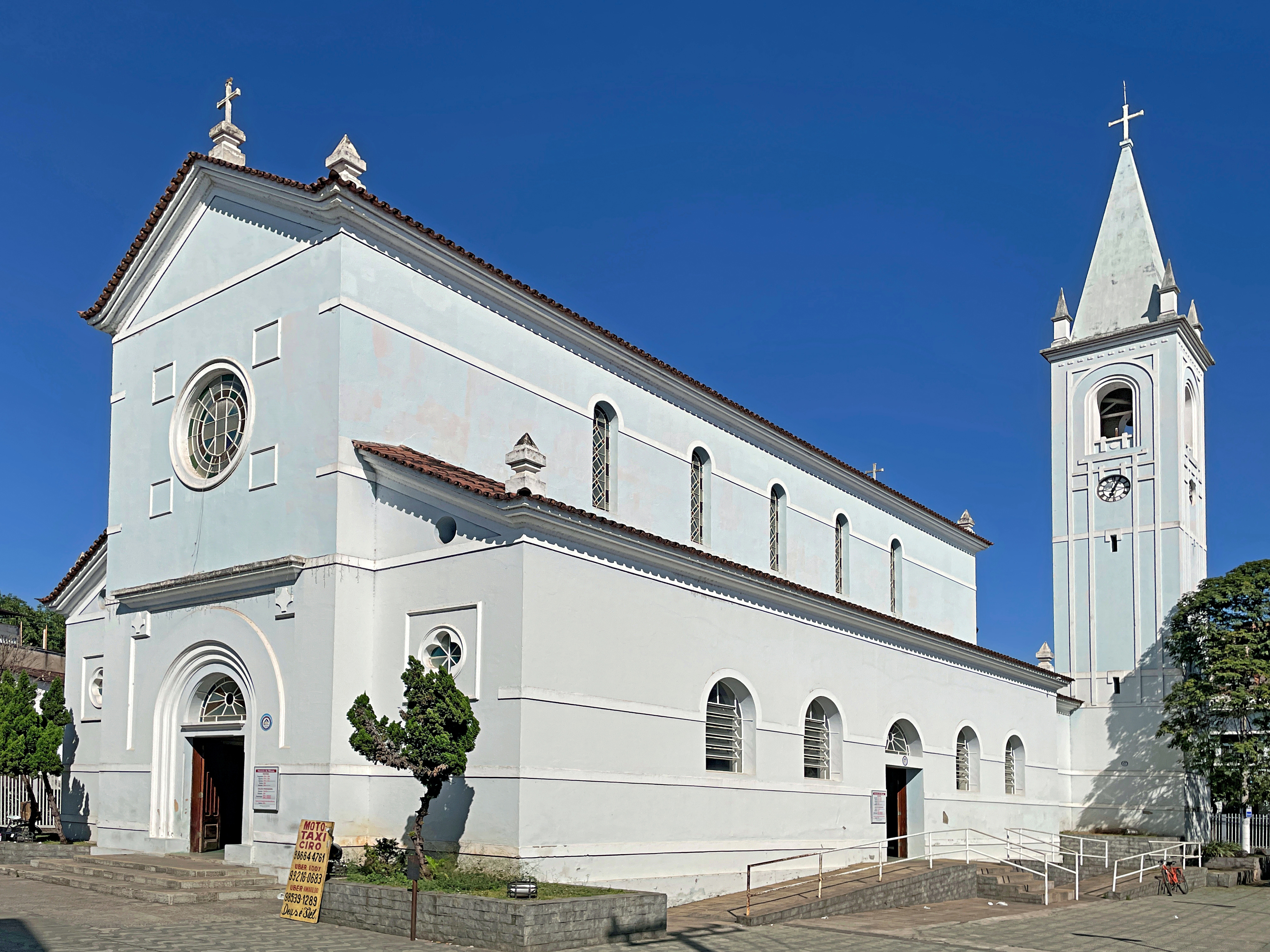
Lateral view and the tower of the Mother Church of Saint Sebastian.

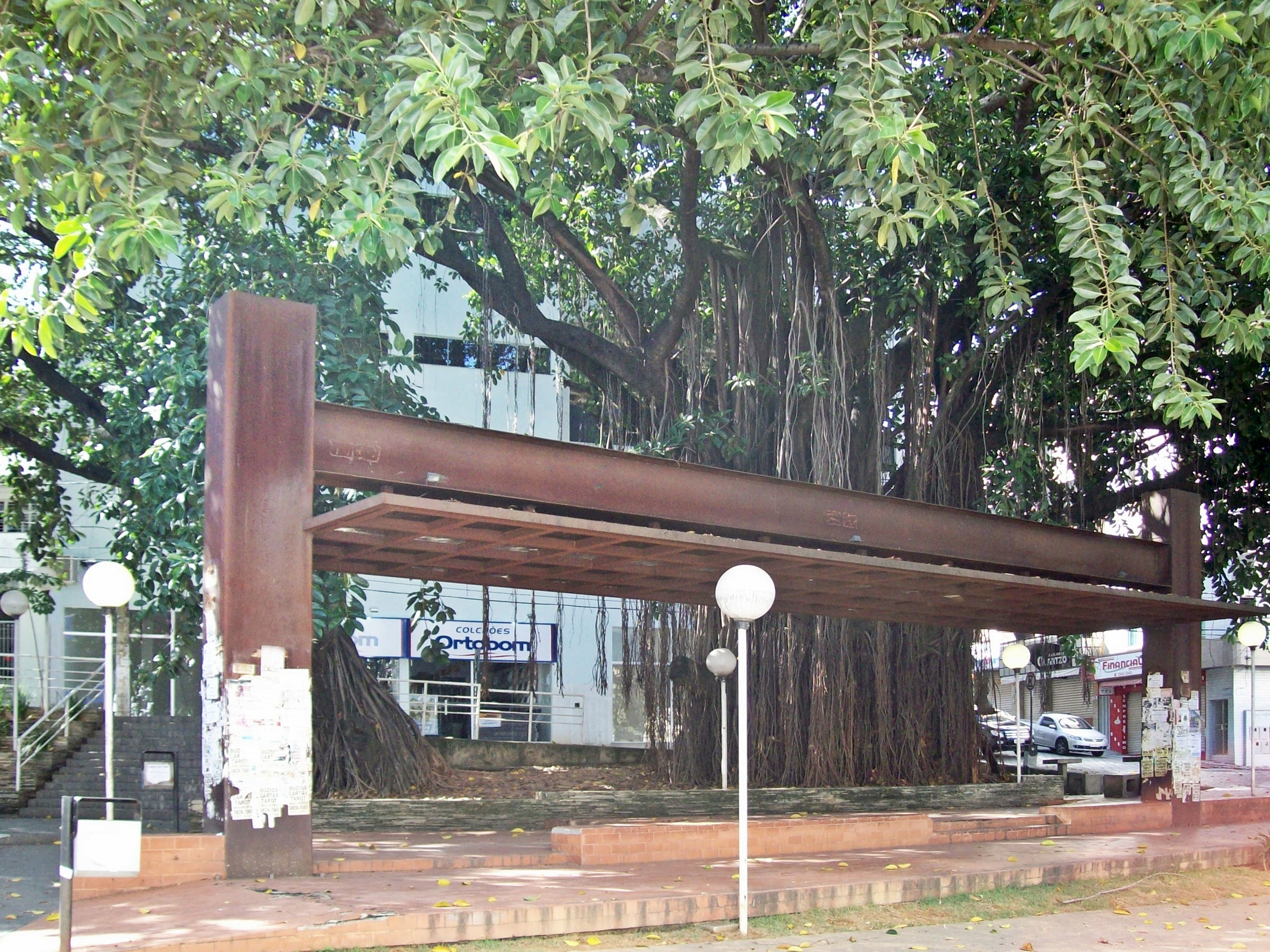
View of the JK Square.

== See also ==
- List of neighborhoods of Coronel Fabriciano
- History of Coronel Fabriciano
