= Bank of São Paulo Building =

Coordinates: 23°32′45″S 46°38′04″W

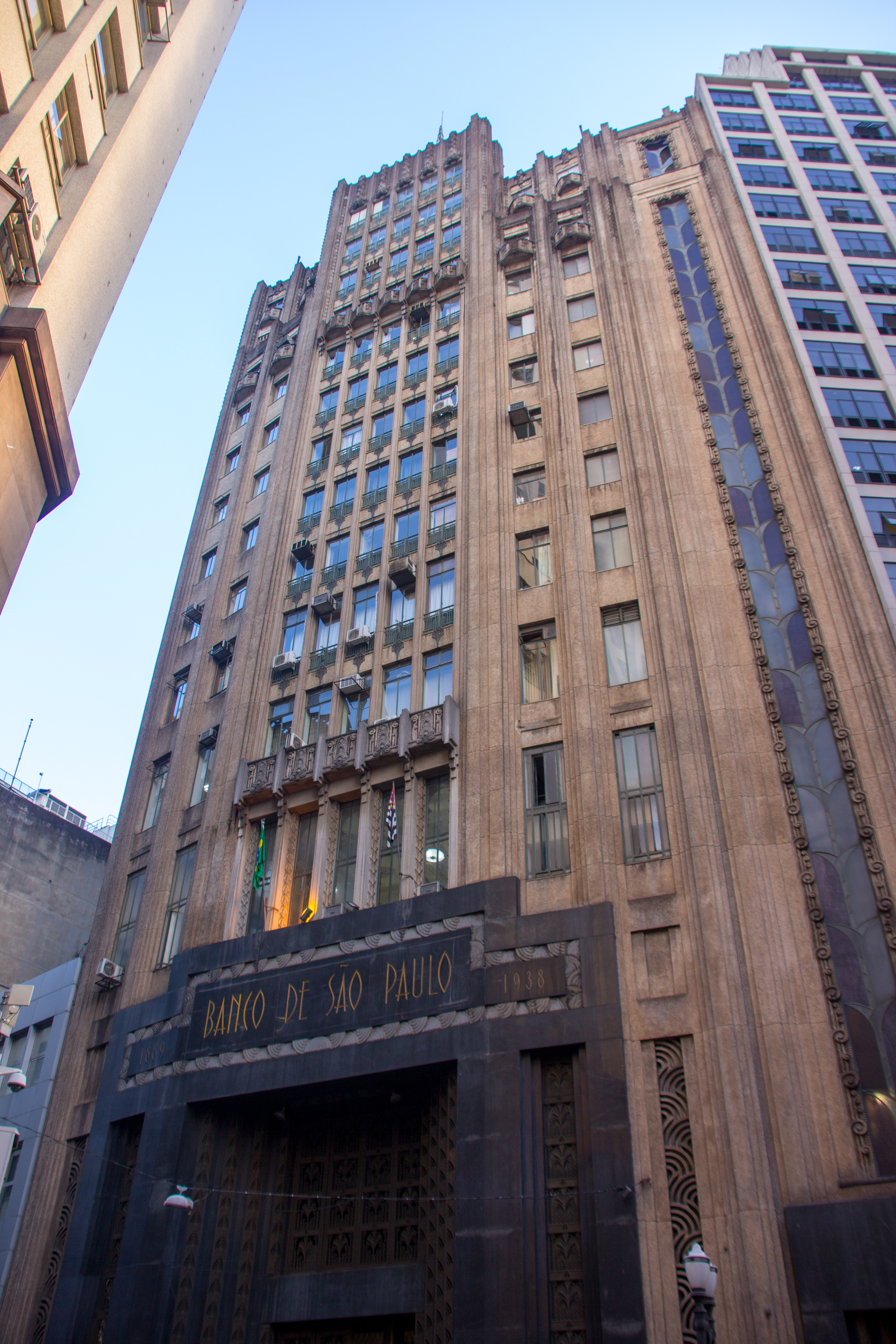
The building in 2018

The building of the former Banco de São Paulo is a listed monument located in the center of the city of São Paulo. Located at Praça Antônio Prado number 9 and Rua 15 de Novembro number 347, it was officially listed by Council for the Defense of Historical, Archaeological, Artistic and Tourist Heritage (CONDEPHAAT) in 2003 for its historical and architectural importance to the city.

Built between 1935 and 1938, the complex was designed by architect Álvaro de Arruda Botelho and housed the former Banco de São Paulo, founded by the Almeida Prado family in the late 19th century. The building, composed of two interconnected blocks, is one of the greatest examples of art deco architecture in the city of São Paulo, mainly due to its geometric design, use of iron and marble, and mosaic flooring.

In 1973, the Banco de São Paulo was sold to Banespa (the State Bank of São Paulo) and became a public asset. Since then, it has been the headquarters of the State Secretariat of Sports, Leisure and Youth of the State of São Paulo.
