= Banco Alfa =

Brazilian commercial bank

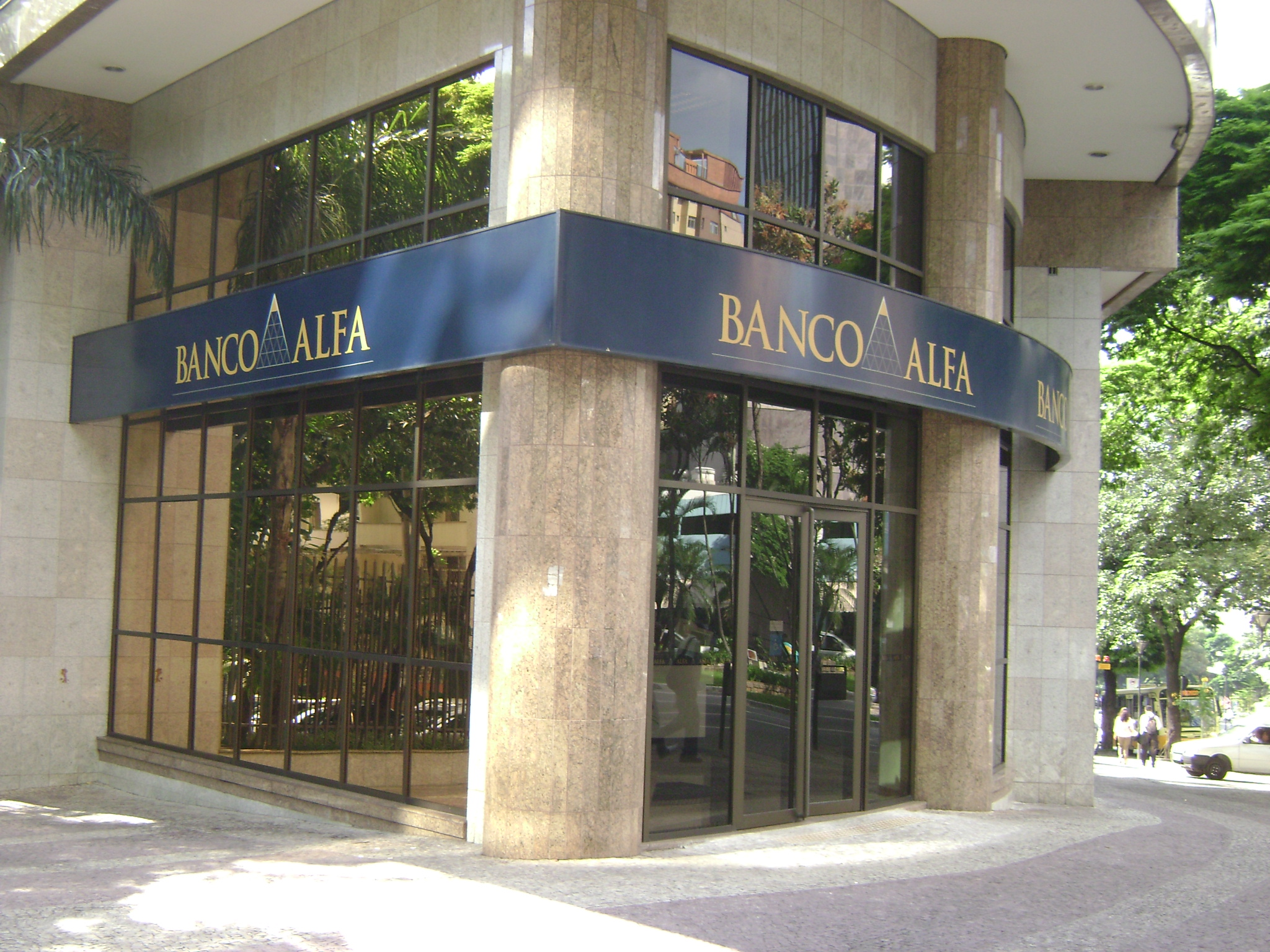
- Industry: Bank
- Founded: 1925; 101 years ago
- Headquarters: São Paulo, São Paulo, Brazil
- Key people: Aloysio de Andrade Faria (President)
- Number of employees: 501 - 1000

Alfa Bank is a Brazilian commercial bank based in São Paulo. The bank's president is Aloysio de Andrade Faria.

== History ==
The bank dates to 1925, when it was founded as Banco da Lavoura de Minas Gerais, whose name was changed in 1972 to Banco Real. In 1998 its controlling interest was sold to ABN AMRO. The financial companies that weren't sold became Alfa Financial Conglomerate, which later merged with Alfa Bank.

The company was acquired in November 2022 by Banco Safra.
