= Alfa Bank =

Alfa Bank may refer to:

- Alfa-Bank, a commercial bank in Russia
- Alfa Bank (Brazil) or Banco Alfa, a commercial bank in São Paulo, Brazil
- Alfa-Bank (Ukraine), former name of Sense Bank

== See also ==
- Alfa Group, Russian international investment group
- Alpha Bank, Greek
