= Santander Brasil =

Brazilian subsidiary of the Spanish Santander Group

Banco Santander (Brasil) S.A.

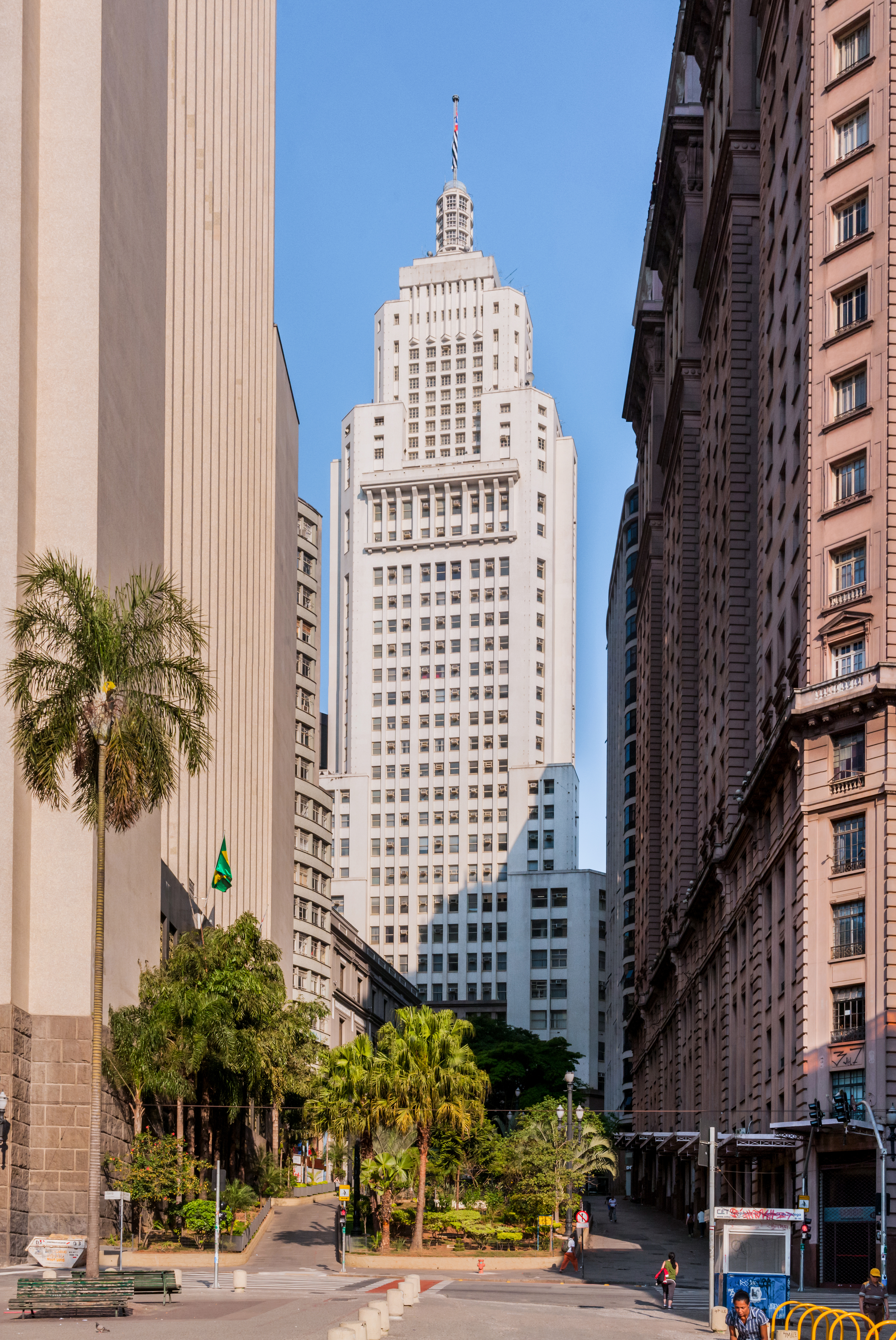
- Farol Santander Building owned and operated by Santander
- Type: Sociedade Anônima
- Traded as: B3: SANB11; NYSE: BSBR; Ibovespa Component
- Industry: Financial services
- Founded: 1982
- Headquarters: São Paulo, Brazil
- Key people: Gilson Finkelsztain, (CEO)
- Products: Banking, insurance, asset management
- Revenue: ▲US$ 15.0 billion (2025)
- Net income: ▲US$ 2.8 billion (2025)
- Total assets: ▲US$ 245.5 billion (2026)
- Number of employees: 49,661
- Parent: Banco Santander
- Website: www.santander.com.br

Banco Santander (Brasil) S.A. is the Brazilian subsidiary of the Spanish Santander Group, headquartered in São Paulo, Brazil. It is the fifth largest banking institution in Brazil, as well as the fifth largest in Latin America, and the largest division of the group outside Europe, accounting for around 30% of its financial results globally by 2019. The bank is listed at the B3 in São Paulo, and at NYSE though ADRs.

Founded in 1982, Banco Santander grew up in Brazil through several significant acquisitions from 1997 to 2007, which made it the fifth largest bank in the country, behind Itaú Unibanco, Banco do Brasil, Banco Bradesco and Caixa Econômica Federal.

== History ==
In 1997, Santander purchased Banco Geral do Comério S.A., initiating the wave of acquisitions through which it earned a position among the largest financial groups in Brazil. In 1998, it acquired Banco Noroeste S.A.. In January 2000, the Southern Financial conglomerate (Banco Meridional and Banco Bozano, Simonsen) joined the group. In November of the same year, Santander made its largest acquisition yet, taking control over Banespa, previously owned by Brazil's wealthiest state, São Paulo.

After the Banespa acquisition, the financial conglomerate Santander Banespa was formed. While a strong franchise, Santander's position was still heavily concentrated in the Southeast region of Brazil.

In 2007, Banco Santander participated along with Royal Bank of Scotland and Fortis in the acquisition of the Dutch financial conglomerate ABN AMRO. Santander took over ABN AMRO's Brazilian assets, mainly formed by the latter's acquisition of Banco Real, and developed a truly national platform, dropping the Banespa name and adopting the Santander Brasil franchise.

On October 7, 2009 the bank went public in the São Paulo Stock Exchange, also issuing ADRs in the NYSE. In Brazil, the IPO raised R$14.1 billion, or US$8.9 billion, the largest stock offering made in the BM&F Bovespa that year.

== See also ==
- Banco Santander
