= Aloysio de Andrade Faria =

Brazilian businessman (1920–2020)

- Born: 9 November 1920; Belo Horizonte, Brazil
- Died: 15 September 2020 (aged 99); Campinas, Brazil
- Education: University of Minas Gerais; Northwestern University
- Occupations: Chairman, Banco Alfa
- Spouse: married
- Children: 5 daughters

Aloysio de Andrade Faria (9 November 1920 – 15 September 2020) was a Brazilian banker and billionaire. At the time of his death he was noted as being one of the world's oldest billionaires.

== Early life ==
Aloysio de Andrade Faria was born in November 1920 in Belo Horizonte, Minas Gerais, Brazil.

== Career ==
A pediatrician by training, Faria shared his medical interest with the financial business sponsored by his father. In 1949 he succeeded his father, Clemente de Faria at the direction of the Banco da Lavoura, transforming it into one of the most successful Brazilian banks, Banco Real, which in late 20th century, sold all its local and international assets to the Netherlands-based ABN AMRO Bank, but keeping other companies from the Real Group, such as Seguros Real (insurance) and Real Leasing Co. Faria, who had two daughters married, did not retire from the financial market and re-invested by incorporating a new personal and investment bank in New York, the Alfa Bank, which is one of the ten largest and most successful banks in the country.

Faria also owned one of the largest Guarana plantations in the world, the Transamerica Corporation, including a hotel and media groups. However he preferred to keep a low profile, and drove a 1960s Mercedes-Benz.

Forbes estimated his net worth to be US$1.7 billion in March 2020.

== Death ==
Faria died on September 15, 2020, at the age of 99.

== See also ==
- List of billionaires
