= Banco Banespa =

Brazilian regional bank (1909–2000)

Banespa
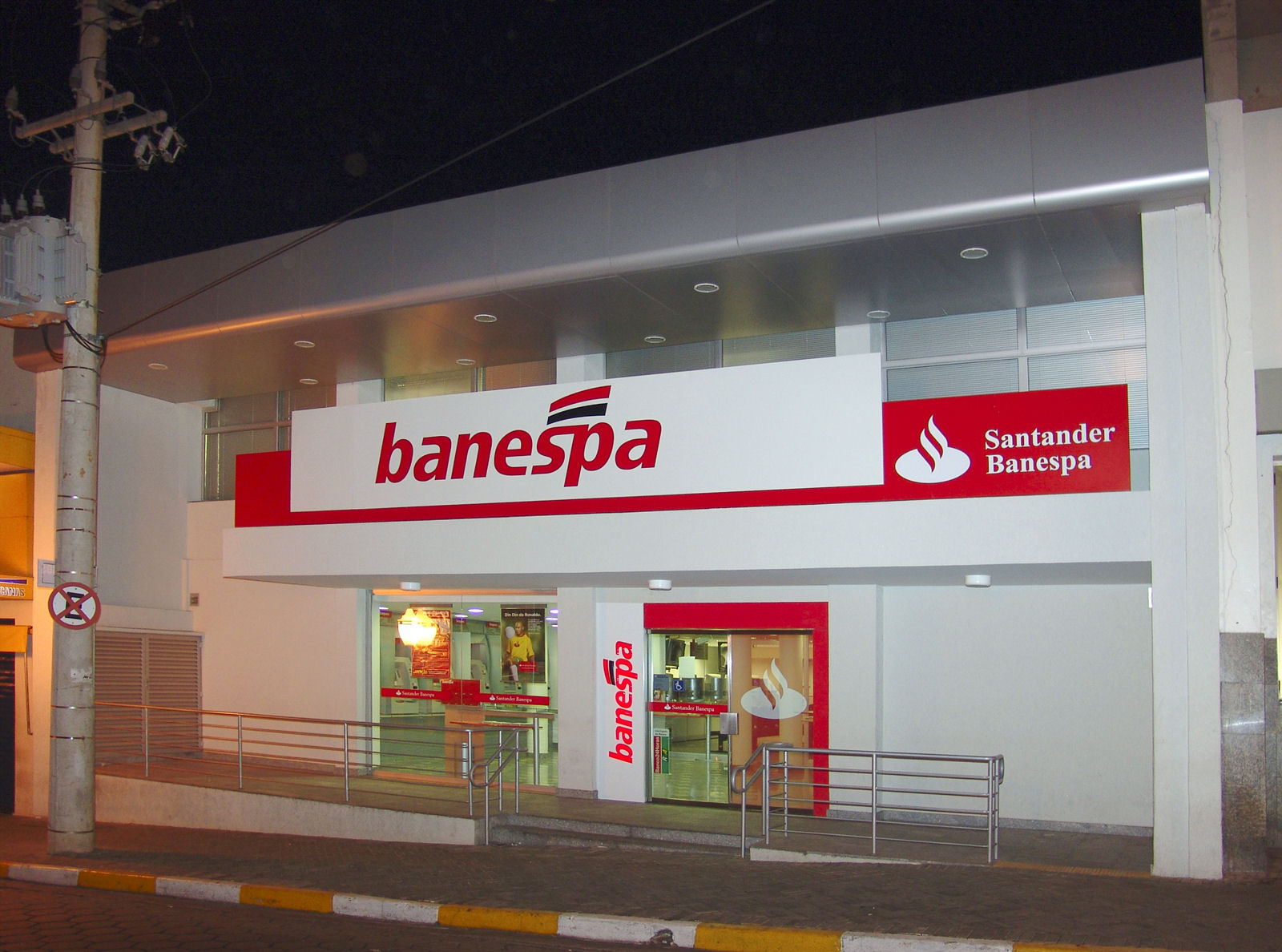
- Banespa agency (at the time as a brand of Santander) in Avaré, São Paulo
- Trade name: Banco do Estado de São Paulo S.A.
- Type: Public company
- Predecessor: Banco de Crédito Hipotecário e Agrícola do Estado de São Paulo
- Founded: 14 January 1909 in São Paulo, Brazil
- Defunct: 20 November 2000
- Fate: Acquired by Santander Brasil
- Successor: Santander Banespa
- Headquarters: Rua João Brícola, 24; Sé; São Paulo, Brazil
- Area served: Whole of São Paulo state
- Key people: José de Paiva Ferreira (CEO)
- Products: Bank services
- Revenue: ▲ R$ 406.7 million (2000)
- Net income: ▼ R$ 406.7 million (2000)
- Total assets: ▲ R$ 20.9 million (2000)
- Number of employees: 37,200 (2000)
- Parent: São Paulo State Government (1909–1996); Brazilian Federal Government (1996–2000); Santander Group (2000–2001)
- Website: www.banespa.com.br

Banco Banespa (Brazilian Portuguese: Banco do Estado de São Paulo) was a Brazilian regional bank, founded in 1909 by the state government of São Paulo. The bank was privatized in November 2000 by the government of former president Fernando Henrique Cardoso and sold to Spanish bank Santander.

== History ==
The bank was established in 1909 under the name Banco de Crédito Hipotecário e Agricultura de São Paulo to finance coffee production in the state. It was founded on the initiative of the then State Treasury Secretary Olavo Egydio de Souza Aranha.

Initially, the bank was dominated by French investors led by Joseph Loste & Cie, with Banco do Comércio e Indústria de São Paulo holding the second-largest stake and the state government ranking third.

Between 1923 and 1926, under Governor Altino Arantes, the institution was restructured: its bylaws were revised, its scope expanded to include industry and commerce, and it was renamed Banco do Estado de São Paulo. At the same time, the state government became the controlling shareholder after subscribing to 147,613 shares.

By the mid-1930s, the bank had grown to a network of 65 branches across both the capital and the interior. In 1937, it opened its first branch outside the state, in Campo Grande, Mato Grosso.

A further phase of expansion followed Brazil’s banking reforms in the mid-1960s. In 1966, the bank acquired controlling interests in Banco Cordeiro and Banco do Pará. In 1967, it absorbed Banco de Crédito Pessoal and purchased Banco Nacional da Lavoura e do Comércio.

The bank went public in 1969 and, in the same year, established its first overseas office in New York City, followed by London in 1970 and Tokyo in 1971. In 1973, it absorbed Banco de São Paulo, and in 1974, it consolidated the Banespa Financial Group, which included eight financial and non-financial entities. The Banespa brand was formally introduced in 1975.

In the early 1990s, the bank incorporated the Banco de Desenvolvimento do Estado de São Paulo (Badesp) and expanded into a full range of services, including commercial banking, credit, investment, and mortgages.

On December 29, 1994, the federal government intervened in the bank, with the intervention lasting until November 27, 1996, when 51% of its shares were transferred to the federal government under President Fernando Henrique Cardoso.

On November 20, 2000, the bank was privatised through an auction and acquired by Grupo Santander, returning it to private ownership. In 2001, the Santander Banespa group was formed, bringing together Banespa, Santander Meridional, Santander Brasil, and Santander S/A, all controlled directly or indirectly by Santander Central Hispano, based in Madrid.

== Controversy ==
In 1998, a public civil action was filed against Banespa concerning the payment of bonuses and profit-sharing to retired employees on equal terms with active staff.

In June 2024, Santander reached an agreement with the Associação dos Funcionários Aposentados do Banespa (Afabesp) to settle the dispute. The agreement, valued at approximately R$2.7 billion, covers 7,299 retirees and heirs and is considered one of the largest settlements ever reached within the Regional Labor Court of the 2nd Region (TRT-2).
