= Banco Real =

Brazilian bank

Banco Real (Renda Fixa)
- Trade name: Banco ABN Amro Real S.A.
- Type: S.A.
- Predecessor: Banco da Lavoura
- Founded: 1 March 1971 in São Paulo, Brazil
- Founder: Aloysio de Andrade Faria
- Defunct: 4 November 2010
- Fate: Acquired by Santander Brasil
- Successor: Santander Brasil
- Headquarters: São Paulo, Brazil
- Area served: Whole of Brazil
- Key people: Fabio Barbosa (CEO)
- Products: Bank services
- Revenue: ▲ R$ 14.7 billion (2007)
- Net income: ▲ R$ 1.6 billion (2007)
- Total assets: ▲ R$ 90.2 billion (2007)
- Number of employees: 33,202 (2008)
- Parent: Conglomerado Alfa (1971–1998); ABN AMRO (1998–2007); Santander Group (2007–2010)
- Website: rendafixacalculadora.com.br//

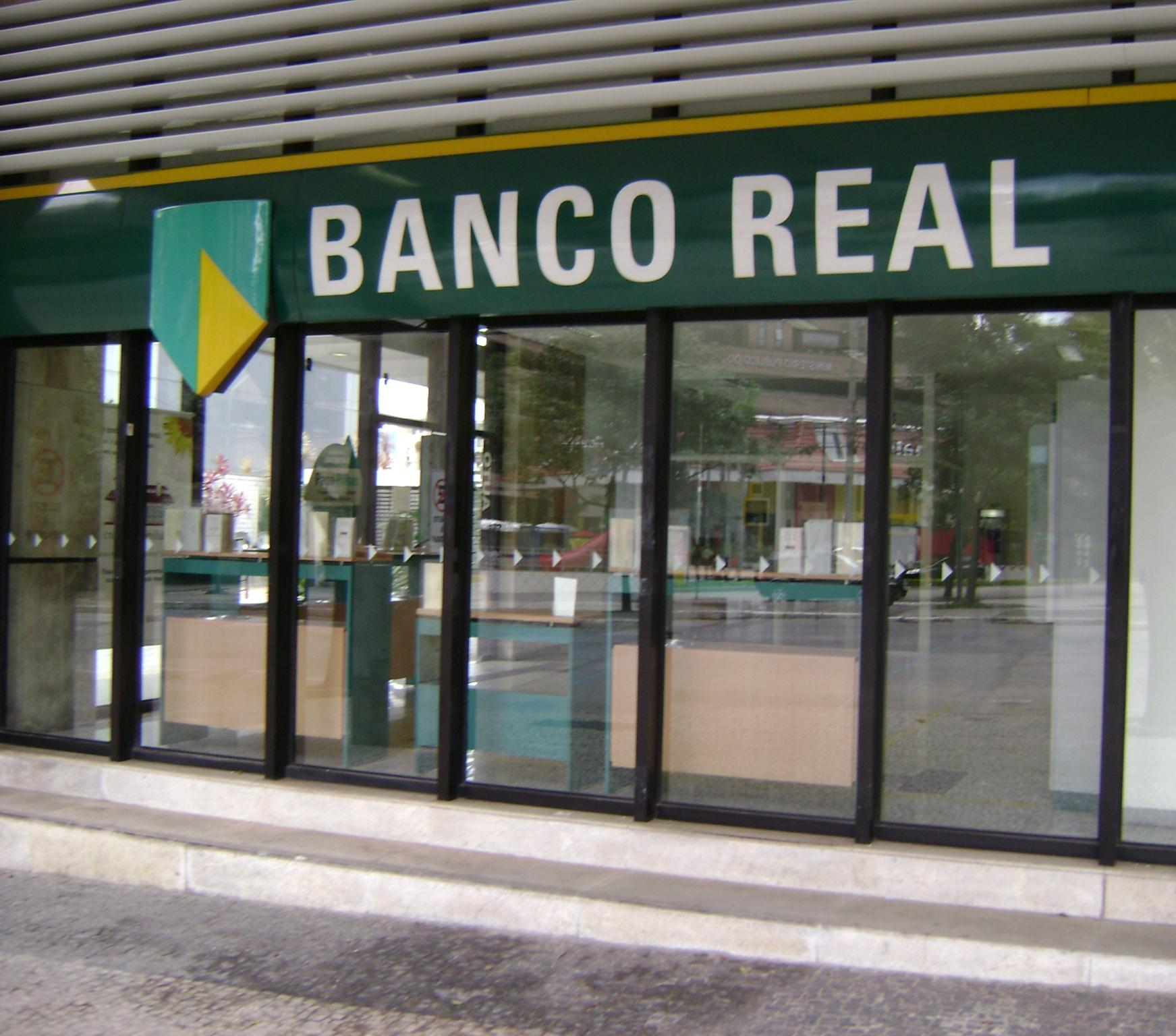
Banco Real branch, in Belo Horizonte

Banco Real was a Brazilian bank, owned by Spain's Banco Santander. ABN AMRO had owned the bank but in October 2007, a consortium led by Royal Bank of Scotland that also included Banco Santander and Belgium's Fortis, acquired ABN AMRO and proceeded to dismember it. Banco Santander acquired Banco Real from the consortium, together with some other ABN AMRO operations in Italy, particularly Banca Antonveneta. Banco Santander already owned Banco Santander Brazil, which incorporated Banco do Estado de São Paulo (Banespa). Combining its existing operations with Banco Real will make Banco Santander Brazil the third largest private bank in the country, after Banco Bradesco and Itaú.

Santander has named the CEO of Banco Real to be the head of the combined group in Brazil, with the charge to unify the operations; Santander transferred the CEO of Banco Santander Brazil to Madrid, and then to New York. He is now CEO of Santander's US subsidiary, Sovereign Bank.

== History ==
Banco Real traces its ancestry back to Banco da Lavoura de Minas Gerais, which was founded in Belo Horizonte, Minas Gerais in 1925. On 1 March 1971, Banco da Lavoura moved its head office from Belo Horizonte to São Paulo and the bank assumed its current name, Banco Real S.A. In 1973 Banco Real began to expand its operations abroad, creating Grupo Real del Paraguay (The Real Group of Paraguay), composed of a commercial bank and three other businesses. In the following year, Banco Real opened a branch on the Brazilian island of Fernando de Noronha and acquired Banco de Minas Gerais, which operated 133 branches at that time.

On its 50th anniversary, in 1975, Banco Real operated 512 branches in Brazil, the biggest branch network in the country, in addition to 12 associated businesses including Companhia Real de Investimentos, then the number one in the domestic ranking. It also had 10 units located abroad - in Bogotá, Panama, Grand Cayman, Nassau, Curaçao, Los Angeles, New York, Toronto, and Mexico City.

In mid-1998, Banco ABN AMRO SA - the Brazilian subsidiary of ABN AMRO Bank - acquired Banco Real. ABN AMRO had begun its activities in Brazil in 1917 as Banco Holandés da America do Sul, when it opened two branches: one in Santos, São Paulo (state) and another in Rio de Janeiro. In 1945, Banco Holandés opened its first branch in São Paulo, and other branches followed. Then in 1963, the bank acquired 50% of the finance company, Aymoré de Crédito, Financiamento e Investimento. Banco Holandés acquired the remainder of the shares in 1970.

In 1993, Banco ABN AMRO moved its headquarters to São Paulo. In November 1998 and November 2001 ABN AMRO-Banco Real acquired two Brazilian state-owned banks, Banco do Estado de Pernambuco S.A. (Bandepe) in Recife and Banco do Estado do Paraiba (Paraiban). Then in October 2003, Banco Real acquired Banco Sudameris from Banca Intesa; in 1998, Sudameris had bought Banco América do Sul, which Japanese immigrants had founded in 1944.
