= Banco da Lavoura de Minas Gerais =

- Company type: Private company
- Industry: Financial services
- Founded: June 16, 1925
- Defunct: March 1, 1971
- Fate: Moved city and renamed
- Successor: Banco Real
- Headquarters: Belo Horizonte, Minas Gerais, Brazil
- Products: Banking

Banco da Lavoura de Minas Gerais (Labor Bank of Minas Gerais) was a Brazilian bank, founded in 1925. On March 1, 1971 the bank moved its head office from Belo Horizonte to São Paulo and assumed its current name Banco Real S.A.

== History ==
Clemente de Faria founded Banco da Lavoura de Minas Gerais in Belo Horizonte, Minas Gerais state, on 16 June 1925. At that time, Brazil was going through a period of economic readjustment that held back economic development and particularly, industrial production, which had been expanding strongly since 1922. It was in the middle of this scenario of economic uncertainty that the lawyer Clemente de Faria - then 34 years old and quite popular as a result of a one-term mandate as state congressman - started a co-operative. The co-operative's objective was to offer credit to farmers in Minas Gerais, thus allowing them access to financial resources that would, in turn, give them the opportunity to develop their activities.

Business at the co-operative grew quickly, despite the general economic uncertainty. In only two years, it transformed itself into a financial institution - the Banco da Lavoura de Minas Gerais (Farmer's Bank of MG) - all the while remaining faithful to its initial goal: providing small farmers with access to farm loans and opportunities to invest their money.

Working with this constituency and adopting innovative solutions for the banking market of its time, "Lavoura", as it was called in Minas Gerais, began to distinguish itself. It attracted the attention of other bankers, who, laughingly, called the bank, "Clemente's little bank", thus was the reputation of its success in the market. However, this sense of humour did not keep them from adopting solutions and products pioneered by "Banco de Lavoura" for their own institutions, such as: personal credit, the economic account (very similar to today's savings account) and the idea of a "piggy bank".

The process of continuous growth at Banco da Lavoura led to its transformation into a limited liability corporation in 1928. Already in the following year, resting on solid foundations, Banco da Lavoura was able to survive the difficulties engendered by the international financial crisis (the crash of '29), which in turn brought economic instability to Brazil and culminated in the revolution of 1930. Despite all that, Banco da Lavoura continued its expansion, opening its first branch in the city of Queluz, later renamed Conselheiro Lafayette.

From then on, the bank grew by opening new branches and acquiring other institutions. In 1934, under the first Getulio Vargas government, the Lavoura bought Banco Comercial de Bom Sucesso. Two years later, while the economy signalled the shrinking importance of coffee exports for the Brazilian trade balance, Banco da Lavoura crossed the borders of Minas Gerais and opened its first branch outside the state, in the city of Rio de Janeiro. In 1937, already with 25 branches and 14 offices, Banco da Lavoura became the 25th largest financial institution in Brazil.

The policy of expansion through the acquisition of other banks consolidated itself in 1937 with the purchase of Banco J. O. Resende and received a strong impulse in 1938. That year, Banco de Lavoura also acquired Banco Comercial de Alfenas, Banco de Pouso Alegre, Banco de Campanha and Banco Santaritense.

Banco da Lavoura continued to consolidate its position as an active participant on the Brazilian financial market, counting on significant capital increases and the opening of new branches and offices in important locations, in addition to continuing its policy of acquiring other institutions.

The bank arrived in São Paulo, Brazil's financial centre, in 1945, when it opened its first branches in the capital of São Paulo state. At that time, Brazil was going through considerable political turmoil, which led to the removal of Getulio Vargas and the end of the Estado Novo, established by Vargas in 1937.

In 1948, the bank came to the north-east of Brazil, opening branches in the cities of Recife, Pernambuco state and Salvador in Bahia. At the same time, Banco da Lavoura set up business in Amapá, thus helping with the integration of the then federal territory through the provision of credit for a company created to extract manganese, the mineral wealth of that region.

In the same year, Dr. Aloyisio de Andrade Faria succeeded his father, who had died in October 1948 at the age of 57. Aloyisio Faria managed the bank by closely following his father's project and policies. Only 28 years at the time, he accomplished the goal of transforming Banco da Lavoura into a financial institution present all over Brazil.

From 1948 until 1955, Banco da Lavouras expanded its network of branches in São Paulo state and in the north-east of the country. It installed a branch in Porto Alegre, Rio Grande do Sul and acquired Banco do Norte do Brasil S.A., Alagoas, adding a network of 180 branches to the organisation. At that time, Banco da Lavoura became the largest private bank in Brazil.

With its position in Brazil consolidated, the bank began its operations abroad. In 1957, it was the first Brazilian bank to open a representative office - which was to become a full agency in 1964 - in New York City. Also in 1957, it was the first bank to set up business in Brasília, even before the inauguration of the future federal capital, thus receiving the "operating license No. 1". During the period from 1958 to 1966, Banco da Lavoura purchased Banco Vera Cruz, with a total of 346 branches, and created Banco Real de Investimentos S.A.

The year 1969 was marked by important events, such as the creation of two additional financial businesses: Companhia Real de Investimentos (The Real Investment Company) and Companhia Real de Crédito Imobiliário (The Real Property Loans Company), in addition to the purchase of Banco Mercantil de Niterói.

On 1 March 1971 the bank moved its head office from Belo Horizonte to São Paulo and the bank assumed its current name Banco Real S.A.
