= Rio Doce, Minas Gerais =

Brazilian municipality located in the state of Minas Gerais

Coordinates: 20°14′31″S 42°54′25″W

- Municipality
- Interactive map of Rio Doce, Minas Gerais
- Country: Brazil
- State: Minas Gerais
- Region: Southeast
- Time zone: UTC−3 (BRT)

Location of Rio Doce within Minas Gerais

Rio Doce is a Brazilian municipality located in the state of Minas Gerais. The city belongs to the mesoregion of Zona da Mata and to the microregion of Ponte Nova. As of 2020, the estimated population was 2,620.

== See also ==
- List of municipalities in Minas Gerais
