= Graciano (disambiguation) =

Graciano is a Spanish red wine grape that is grown primarily in Rioja.

It may also refer to:

== People with the name ==
- Graciano Antuña (1903–1937), Spanish union socialist politician
- Graciano Brito (born 1985), Cape Verdean footballer
- Graciano Atienza Fernández (1884–1935), Spanish journalist, lawyer and politician
- Graciano Fonseca (born 1974), Colombian road racing cyclist
- Graciano Ricalde Gamboa (1873–1942), Mexican mathematician
- Graciano García García (born 1939), Spanish journalist
- Graciano Junior Gonçalves (born 1993), Brazilian footballer
- Graciano López Jaena (1856–1896), Filipino national hero
- Graciano Nepomuceno (1881–1974), Filipino sculptor and woodcarver
- Graciano dos Santos Neves (1868–1922), Brazilian physician and politician
- Graciano Rocchigiani (1963–2018), German boxer
- Clóvis Graciano (1907–1988), Brazilian artist
- Eduardo Graciano (born 1967), Mexican cyclist
- Fernando Torres Graciano (born 1970), Mexican politician

== See also ==
- Graciano San Francisco, a Honduran football club based in Gracias
- Soledad de Graciano Sánchez, the second-largest city of the state of San Luis Potosí in Mexico
