= DMA Distribuidora =

Brazilian supermarket chain

DMA Distribuidora S/A
- Type: Private
- Industry: Retail (Discount/Grocery)
- Founded: 1950
- Headquarters: Belo Horizonte, Brazil
- Key people: Levy Nogueira, (Chairman)
- Products: Consumer Goods
- Revenue: ▲US$ 1.0 Billion (2012)
- Number of employees: 15,000
- Website: www.grupodma.com.br

DMA Distribuidora is the seventh largest supermarket chain in Brazil, both in number of stores and value of sales, and are the largest Brazilian grocery store chain without foreign participation in their capital. DMA Distribuidora is the 230th largest overall company in Brazil.

It was founded in 1950 in Belo Horizonte, Minas Gerais. It is the market leader in the states of Minas Gerais (Brazil's second largest state by population) and Espírito Santo. Its position among the largest grocery chains is duly recognized by its loyal customers. The company has 91 stores branded as Epa Supermercados, Martplus and Viabrasil.

== History ==
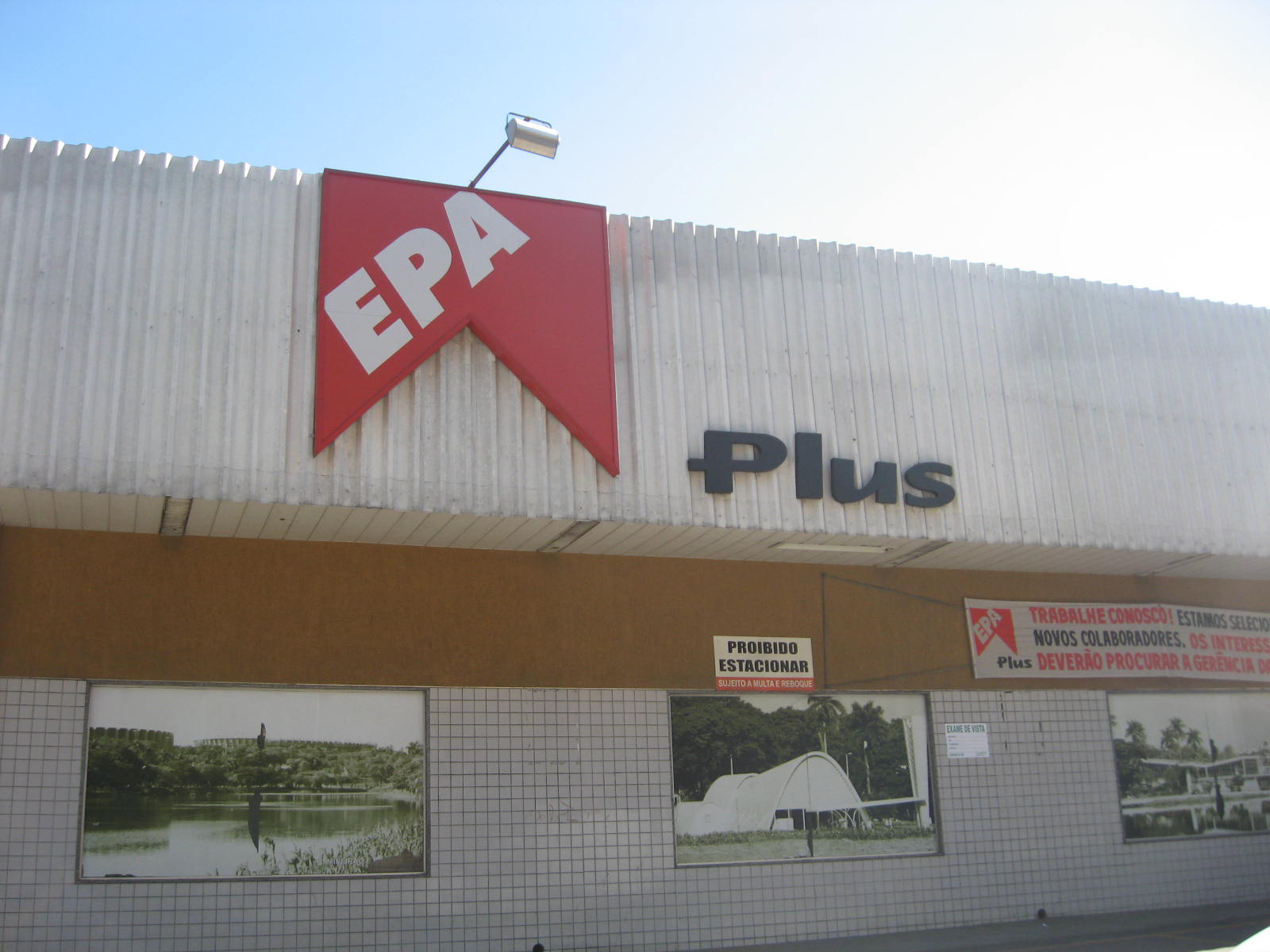
Store in the Pampulha region, in Belo Horizonte

The first supermarket opened in 1972, in Belo Horizonte. The company becomes then a joint stock corporation with the name of Epa Supermercados, Inc., and enjoyed thereafter a remarkable expansion period.

The company, as of its foundation, has been focused on customers from the economic consumer classes C, D and E. In 1996, it decided that it should operate within another niche market, made up by customers from classes A and B, so the company launched a new brand, Mart Plus.

Early in 2000, a new shareholders group, named WRV Empreendimentos, joined the family that originated the group. DMA Distribuidora Inc. became a stock corporation. With the new entrepreneurs, the company had found a new dynamic, passing from the 21st place to 6th place in 2006, according to the ranking of ABRAS – Brazilian Supermarkets Association.

In 2003, the network, then operating only in Minas Gerais, started its participation in the State of Espírito Santo market.

In 2004, Viabrasil, a compact hypermarket network, was incorporated into DMA.

Currently, DMA Distribuidora Inc. is the largest food retail company in Minas Gerais and Espírito Santo states, both in number of shops and amount of sales invoices.

As for retail companies, DMA Distribuidora is among the largest ten companies in Brazil, according to the ABRAS ranking for 2007, and it is among the largest five with a 100% national stock capital, employing more than 10.500 workers.

== Brands ==
=== Epa Supermercados ===
This network operates in the State of Minas Gerais, using a total sales area of 60,420 square meters (645,800 sq. ft.) serving 3,046,000 consumers / month; and in the State of Espírito Santo the network has a total sales area of 33,572 square meters (355,200 sq. ft.) and a flow of 1,239,000 consumers / month. The shops are medium-size stores, selling to the most diversified levels of customers. EPA concentrates on the economic classes C, D and E, being the oldest retail trade mark of DMA and of the State of Minas Gerais, where it was inaugurated 50 years ago. EPA currently owns 77 sales outlets distributed in the two states: they are corner stores, working within this concept, with expertise and competence.

=== Martplus ===
This is a differentiated supermarket model, adequate to the needs and expectations of a more demanding public. It is focused on economic consumers classes A and B, and operates presently 8 stores, with a total of 11,866 square meters (118,400 sq. ft.) of sales area and a delivery service. The customer flow in the Mart Plus stores is around 500 thousand customers/ month; customers with high purchasing power, which gives to this network a special status in the retail industry of Belo Horizonte.

=== Viabrasil ===
This is a compact market network that has three stores in the state capital city of Belo Horizonte and the adjoining city of Contagem, Minas Gerais State. One of the stores operates the retail concept jointly associated with the wholesale concept serving a diversified public. With a total sales area that is around 13,938 square meters (139,900 sq.ft.) and a flow of 400 thousand consumers/ month within Greater Belo Horizonte.
