= Catholic University Center of Eastern Minas Gerais =

Brazilian higher education institution

- Centro Universitário Católico do Leste de Minas Gerais
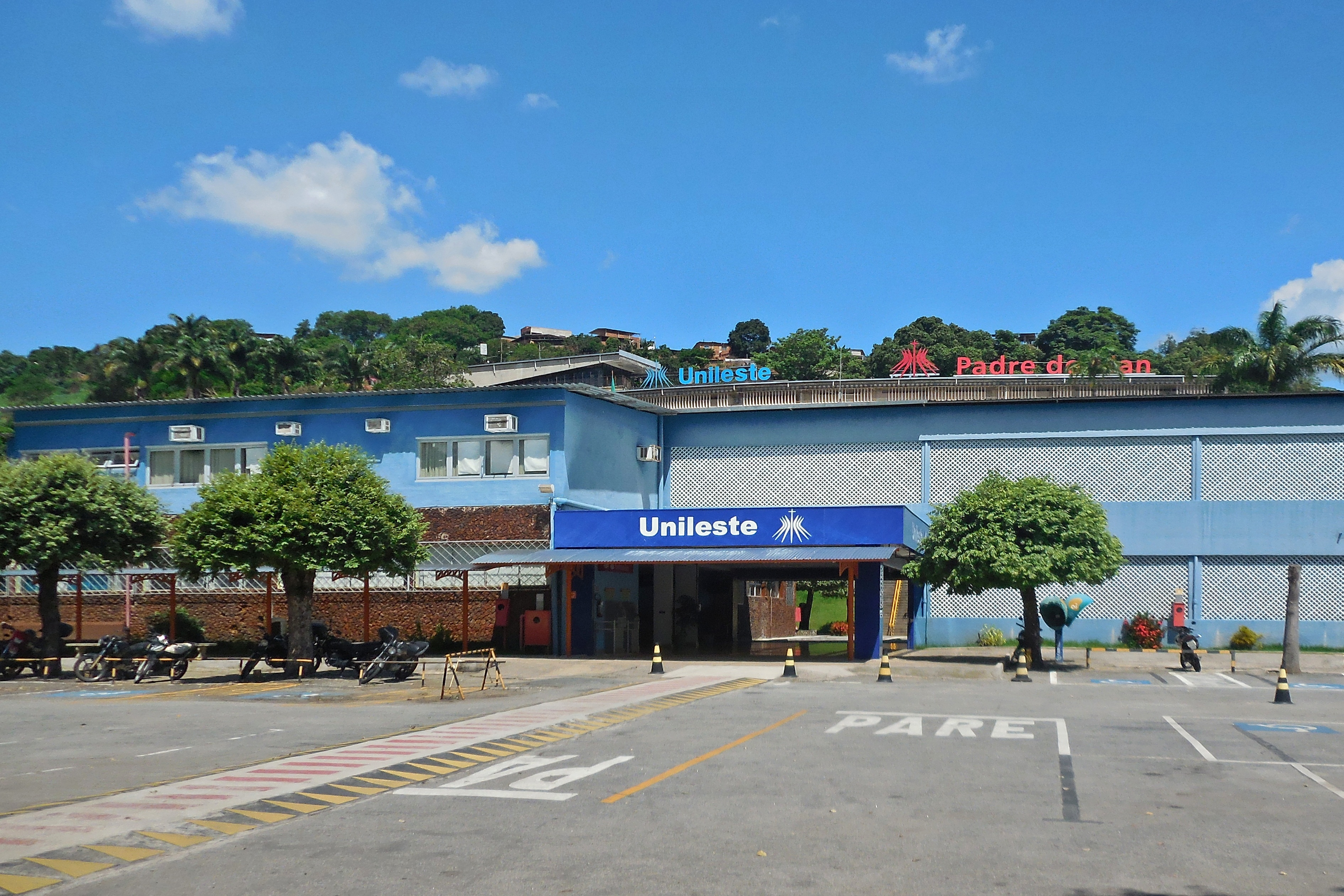
- Other names: Unileste
- Type: Private University Center
- Established: April 1, 1969
- Affiliations: Brazilian Catholic Education Union (UBEC)
- Location: Coronel Fabriciano, Minas Gerais, Brazil; 19°30′52.05″S 42°36′42.18″W
- Website: http://unileste.catolica.edu.br/
- Location in Brazil Minas Gerais

The Catholic University Center of Eastern Minas Gerais (Unileste) is a Brazilian private higher education institution based in Coronel Fabriciano, in the interior of the state of Minas Gerais. It was created as part of the social works of the Padres do Trabalho Congregation in 1969, configuring itself as the first technical and higher education level school in the current Steel Valley Metropolitan Region (RMVA).

Recognition as a University Center occurred in 2000, and the Brazilian Catholic Education Union (UBEC) became the maintainer in 2005. Its complex is distributed over two campuses - one main campus in Coronel Fabriciano, which also includes the Padre de Man School, and another in Ipatinga.

== History ==
=== Origin and development ===
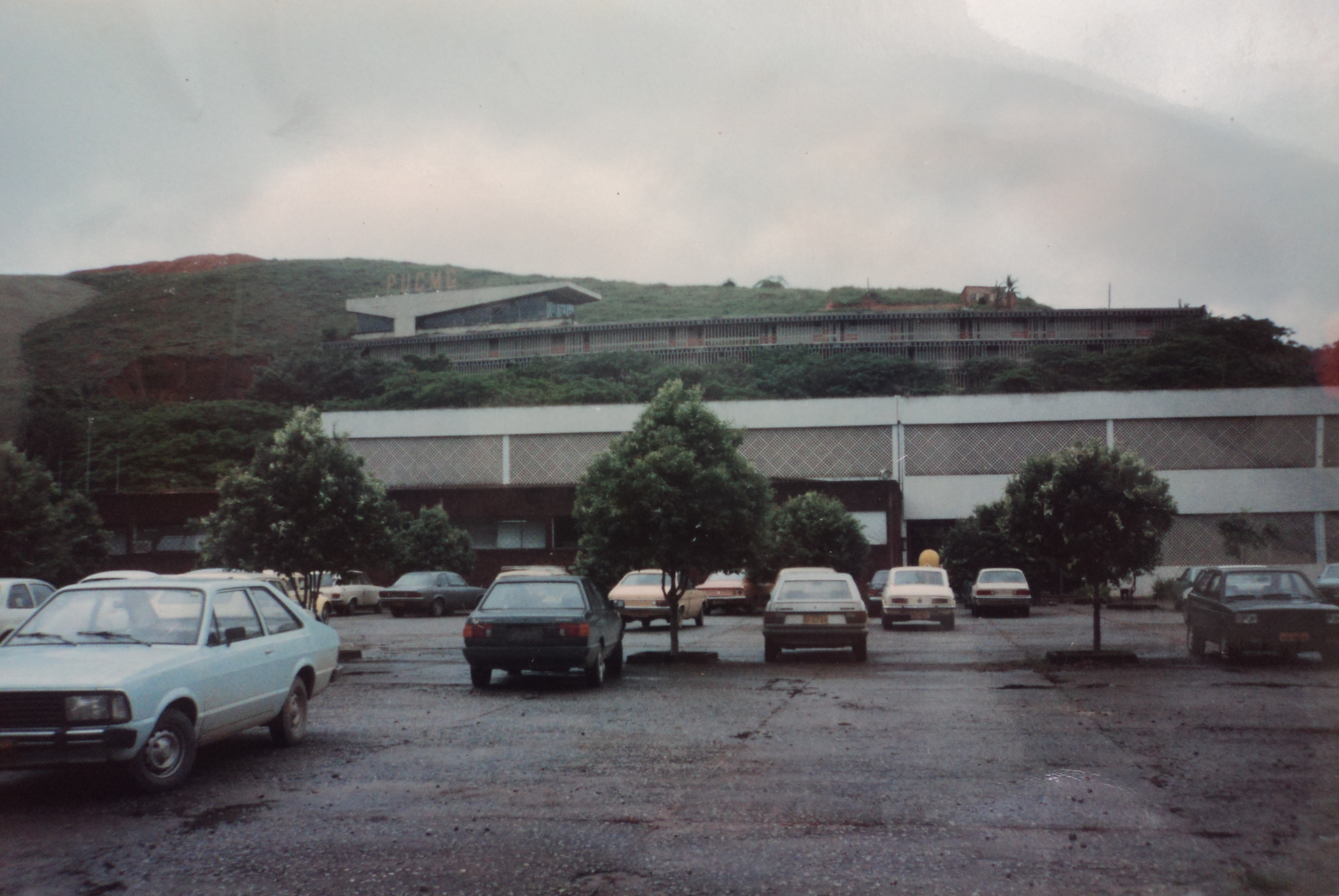
Unileste in the 1990s.

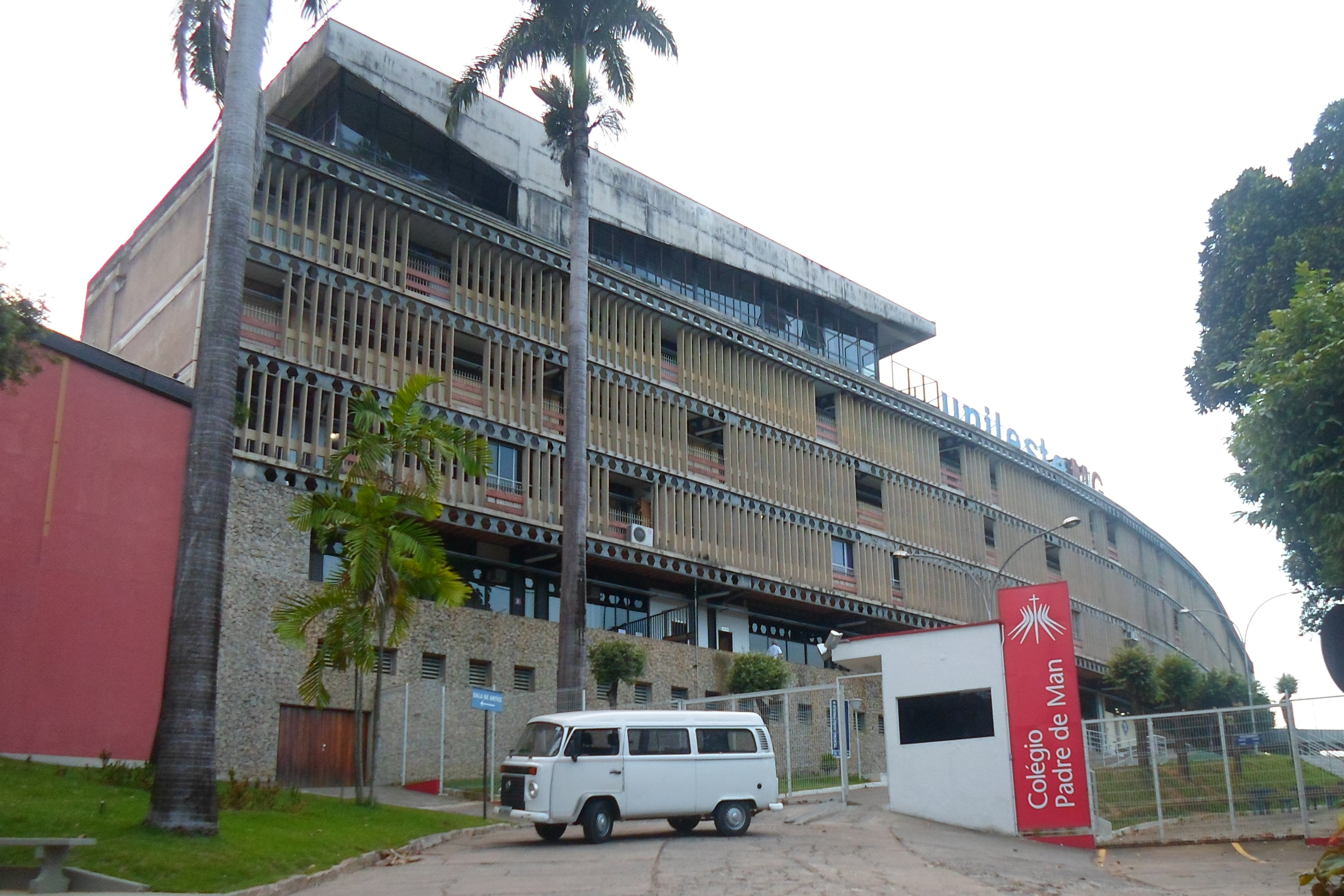
Padre de Man School, on the Coronel Fabriciano campus.

The implementation of large industries in the current Steel Valley Metropolitan Region, as well as in other cities of eastern Minas Gerais, implied a strong process of socioeconomic and cultural transformation in the region. The accelerated and, sometimes, uncontrolled demographic growth favored the increase of the housing deficit and of violence. Thus, the Catholic Church began to intervene with religious teachings and the organization of social projects. In this sense, the Padres do Trabalho Congregation was established in Rio Doce Valley, under the leadership of Father José Maria de Man, a native of the Netherlands, on October 28, 1963, three weeks after the episode known as the Ipatinga Massacre.

The Padres do Trabalho worked on social projects in the Steel Valley region and proposed the construction of the University of Labor (UT), at first in the so-called Buraco Street, in the current downtown area of Ipatinga, when it was still a district of Coronel Fabriciano. This location was desired because it was a poor slum with a high incidence of prostitution, at the same time as it was close to the Usiminas plant, which could provide both educational training and professional opportunities to this population. However, the Mariana Archdiocese donated the land of Caladinho Farm, where the installation of the university was initiated by the Padres do Trabalho in 1965.

With the support of the then Diocese of Itabira, the UT was built and, attached to it, the Technical School of Coronel Fabriciano (CTCF) - now the Padre de Man School. Thus, the complex became the first technical and higher education school in the Steel Valley. The "T" shape expressed at the top of the tallest building, where the Padre de Man School is located, refers to the first emblem and acronym and means "work (trabalho), tenacity (tenacidade)". The CTCF became operational in 1967 and the university's higher education courses in Literature and Social Studies were started in 1968, but the founding of UT occurred on April 1, 1969, with the inauguration of the School of Engineering. Initially the unit served about 300 students, while the CTCF had started its activities with another 400.

In 1972, the Padres do Trabalho Congregation gave rise to the Educational and Technical Society (SEUT), which was in charge of building the university neighborhoods, a set of elitist housing created in order to house students, teachers and employees in Coronel Fabriciano. On October 13, 1976, SEUT's property was donated to the Minas Gerais Culture Society (SMC), the same maintainer of the Catholic University of Minas Gerais (UCMG), now the Pontifical Catholic University of Minas Gerais (PUC-MG). This was one of the last actions of José Maria de Man, who died in Contagem in 1981.

=== Reformulation and consolidation ===
The donation of the former UT to the SMC kept the institution in Coronel Fabriciano as a PUC campus until 1990. In this year, demands that were not met by PUC, such as the creation of new courses, investments, and social and economic autonomy in relation to the main campus in Belo Horizonte, associated with financial problems in the last years of the 1980s, led to the announcement of the closure of the Steel Valley campus by PUC. This event was a direct effect of the crisis generated by hyperinflation, a situation that plagued the entire country at this turn of the decade and that led to a significant reduction in the number of students.

The deactivation of the university was taken for granted and there were demonstrations in the city against the end of activities in 1990, which encouraged the return of its assets to SEUT and the subsequent creation of the Catholic Institute of Minas Gerais (ICMG). Thus, this organization, linked to the Diocese of Itabira-Fabriciano, took over the maintenance of the educational institution under the direction of Dom Lélis Lara; the religious, active in several social works in the Steel Valley, as well as Father José Maria de Man, intermediated the mobilization of several fronts, leaders and local entities in favor of the continuity of the university's operation. With the change in administration, the teaching center acquired the name and acronym of its new manager (ICMG).

The recognition as a University Center occurred on June 5, 2000, which led the institution to be transformed into the University Center of Eastern Minas Gerais (Unileste-MG), as had been projected by ICMG. This process favored the expansion of the educational institution's reach throughout the municipalities of the RMVA and surrounding cities. Later, the campuses of Ipatinga and Timóteo (the latter later extinct) were created, and there was the insertion of several new courses, reaching a total of 27 in 2007. This was a context of expansion of higher education in Brazil, coupled with the introduction of mechanisms for low-income students to access the country's colleges by the Federal Government.

In 2005, the UBEC became the center's maintainer, based on a proposal by the ICMG itself and the diocese, as a way to ensure greater financial security for Unileste. The acronym "Unileste-MG" was simplified to "Unileste" in 2011, as part of a visual identity reform. On May 10, 2019, the name change from "University Center of Eastern Minas Gerais" to "Catholic University Center of Eastern Minas Gerais" was published in the Official Diary of the Union.

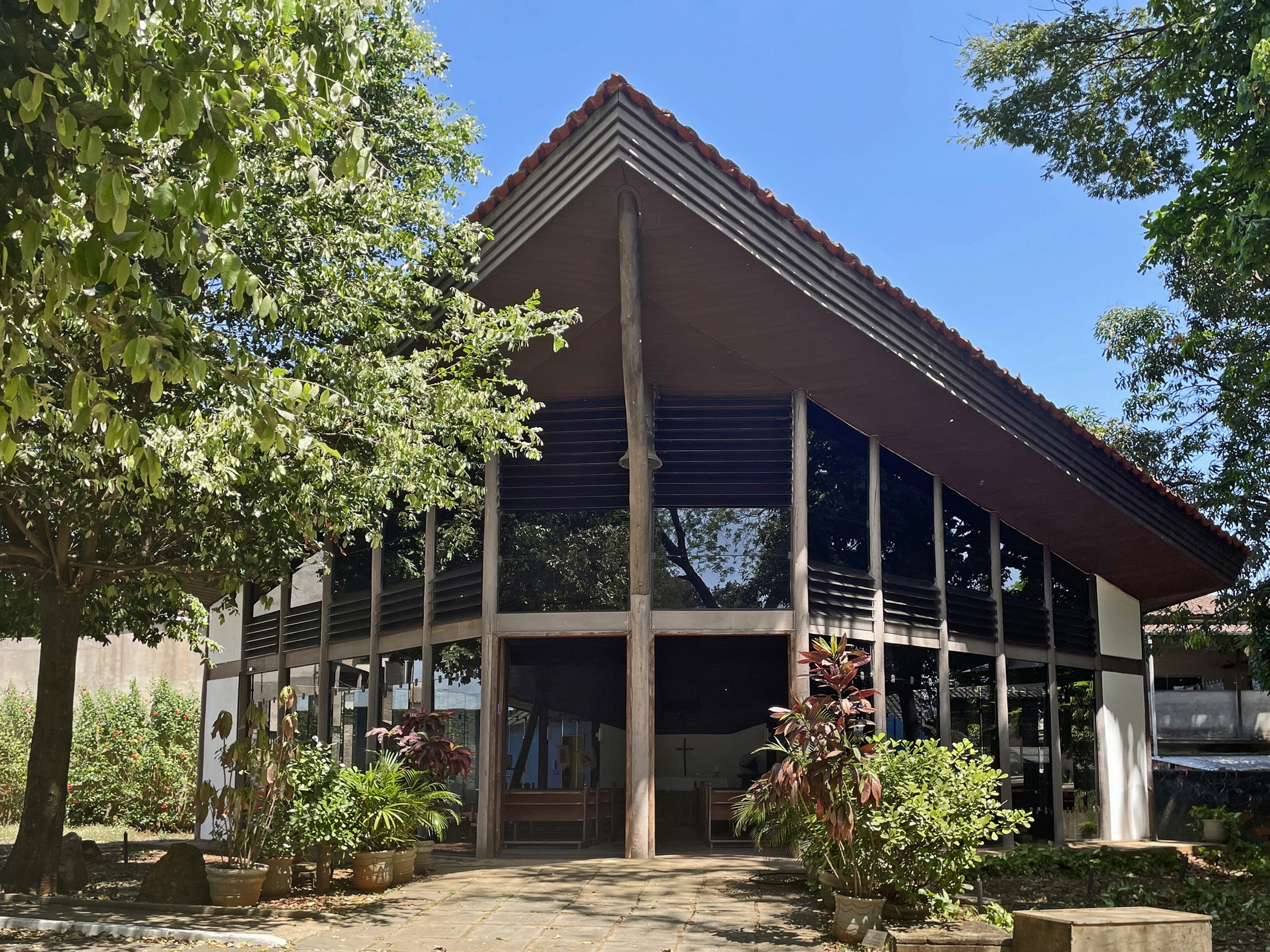
Holy Trinity Chapel.

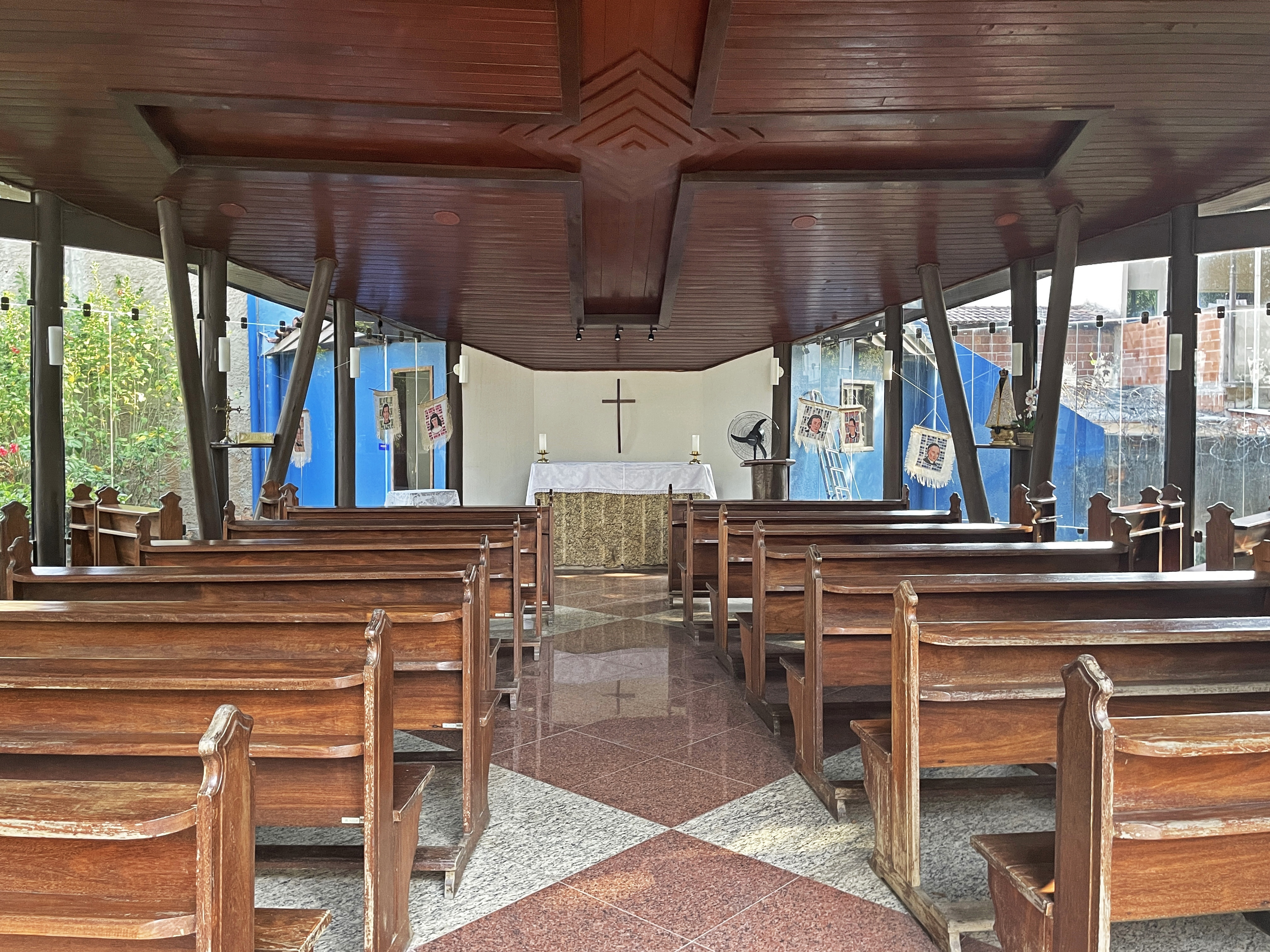
Holy Trinity Chapel interior.

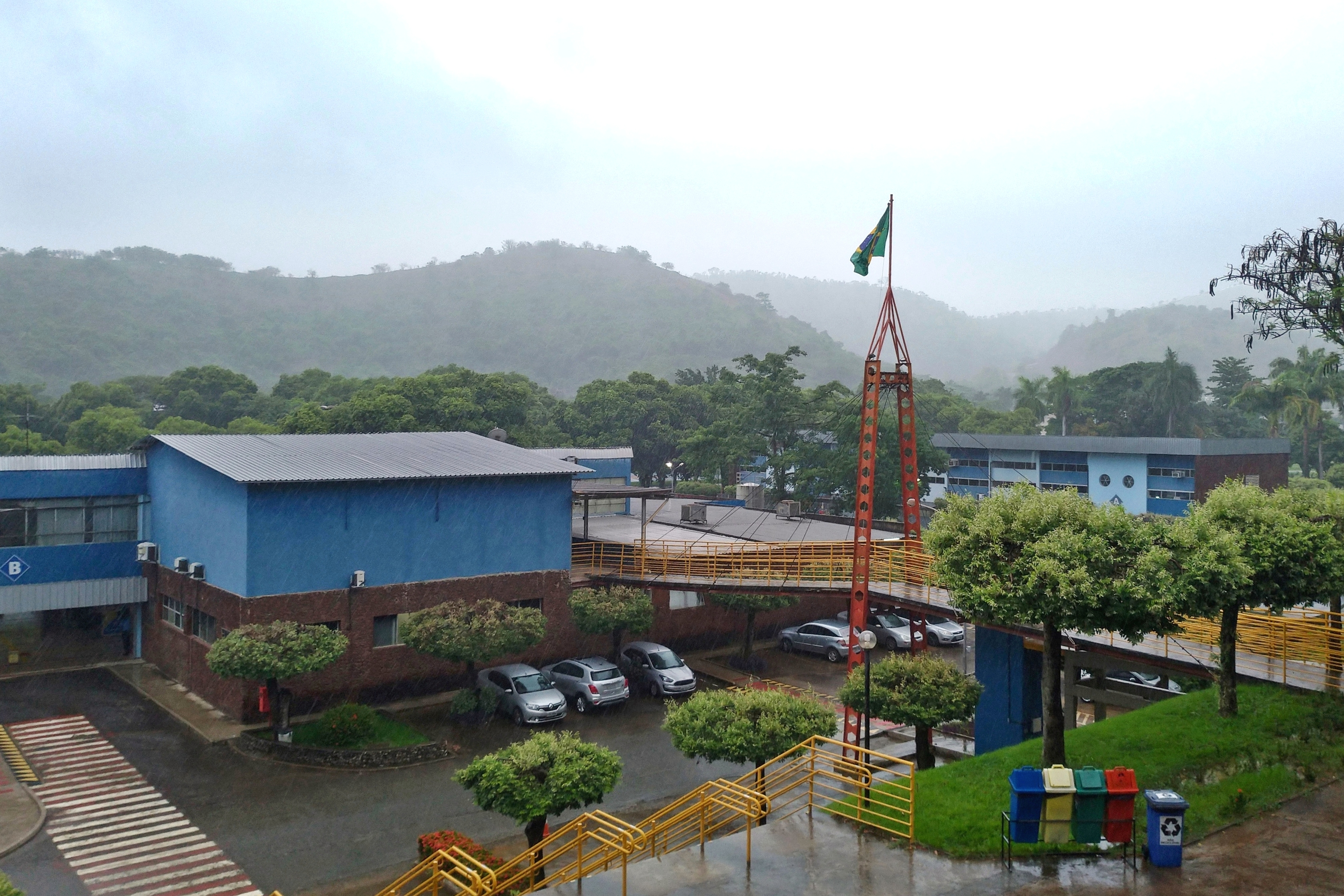
Interior view of Coronel Fabriciano campus.

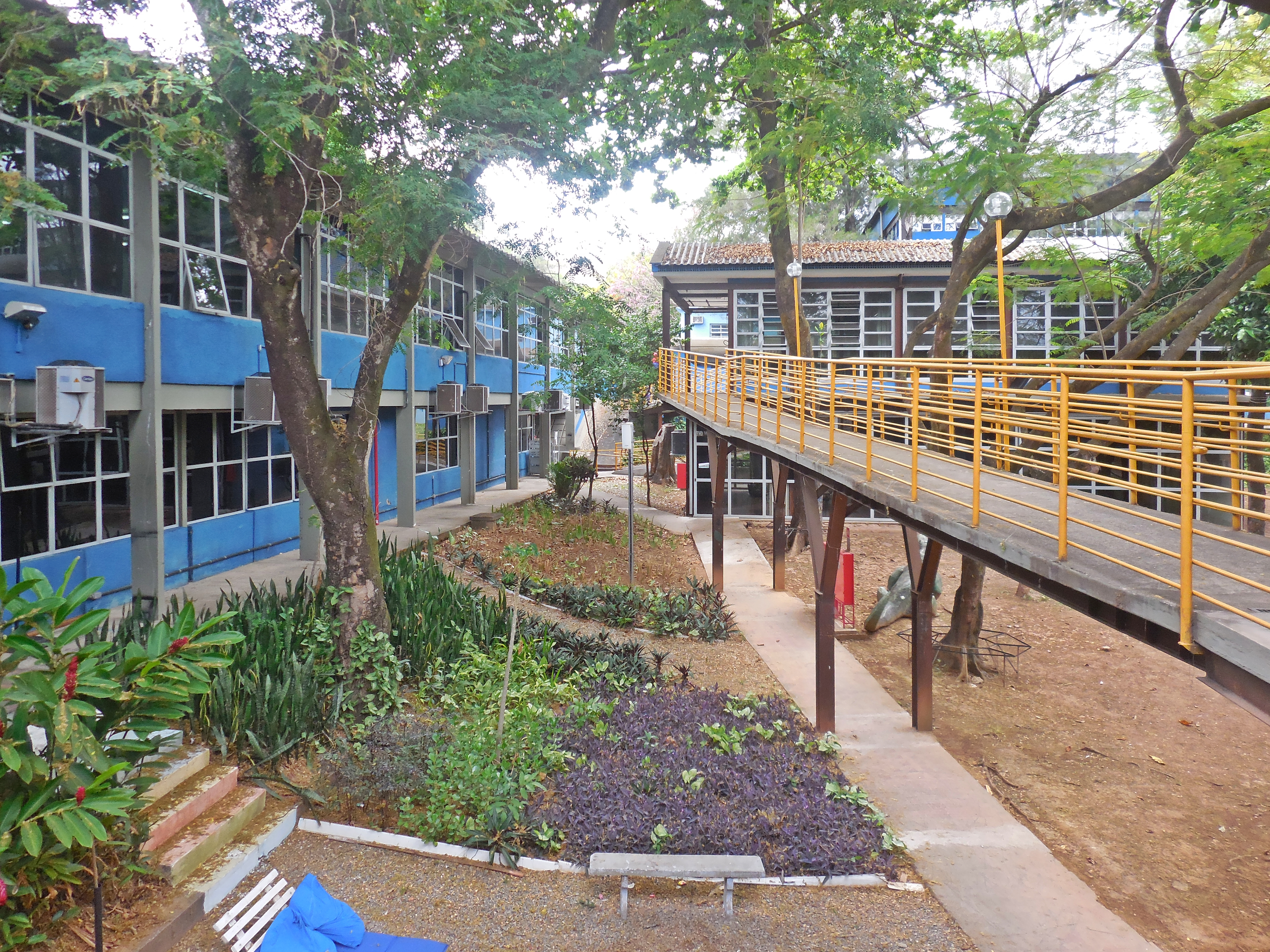
Building E of Unileste, college of Architecture and Urbanism, a course created in 2000.

== Courses and infrastructure ==
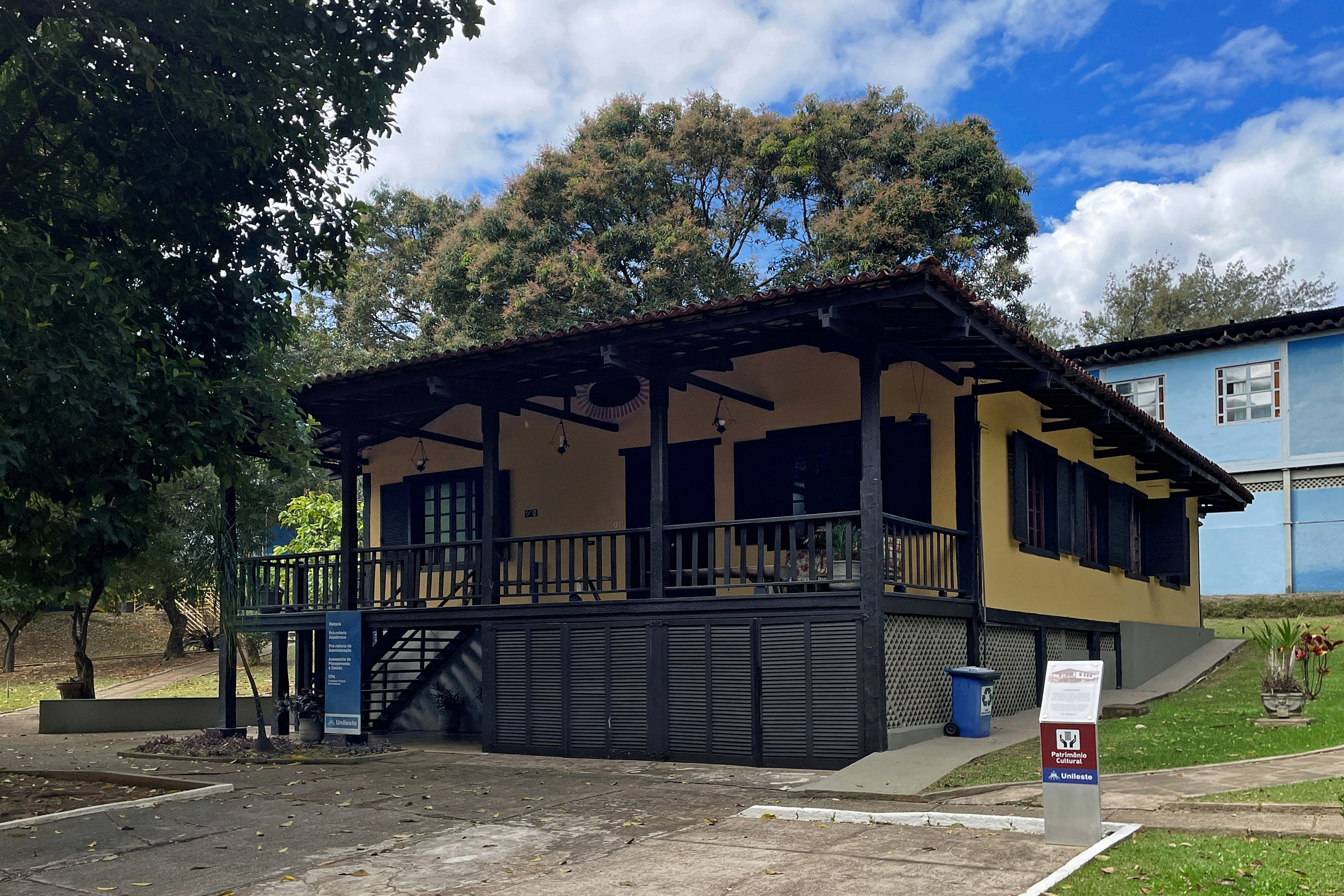
View of Fazendinha, Coronel Fabriciano's cultural patrimony.

The institution provided 23 undergraduate courses within the areas of social and applied sciences, polytechnics, education, and health, as well as technical training in distance learning and graduate studies, according to information from December 2019. Moreover, the university center carries out teaching, research, and outreach activities in various areas of knowledge. Among research activities it is worth mentioning the production of the Integrated Development Master Plan (PDDI) of the Steel Valley Metropolitan Region, finalized in 2018. There is also provision of services to the community by students under the coordination of professors, such as gymnastics classes for children, psychological care, and law practices.

The main campus of Unileste, in Coronel Fabriciano, has about 128 thousand m^{2}, of which 18 thousand m^{2} were built-up areas until 2008. This unit is equipped with the Padres do Trabalho Auditorium (with 99 seats), Mr. Zezinho Auditorium (110 seats), the Aldir Castro Chaves Sports Center (three sports courts and two fields), and laboratories in the areas of chemistry, electronics, mechanics, electricity, telecommunications, and industrial automation. The Padre de Man School is also located on the Coronel Fabriciano campus. Below the university center's parking lot runs the Caladinho Stream, whose stretch of the stream is canalized. The Unileste unit in Ipatinga, in turn, corresponds to the School of Health.

The campus of Unileste in Coronel Fabriciano houses landmarks such as the Fazendinha, which was planned as a replica of the farmhouse that existed prior to the construction of the university center and initially functioned as a guest house; the João Paulo II Theater, built on the first floor of the Padre de Man College in 1978; and the Father Joseph Cornélius Marie de Man Museum, which is shaped like a circle and whose building dates back to the 1970s. However, the museum was established on July 13, 1993. These three buildings were listed as cultural heritage of the municipality in 1997. Also noteworthy is the Dom Cardeal Serafim Fernandes Araújo Library (Central Library), which is open to the public and has one of the largest bibliographic collections in the region.

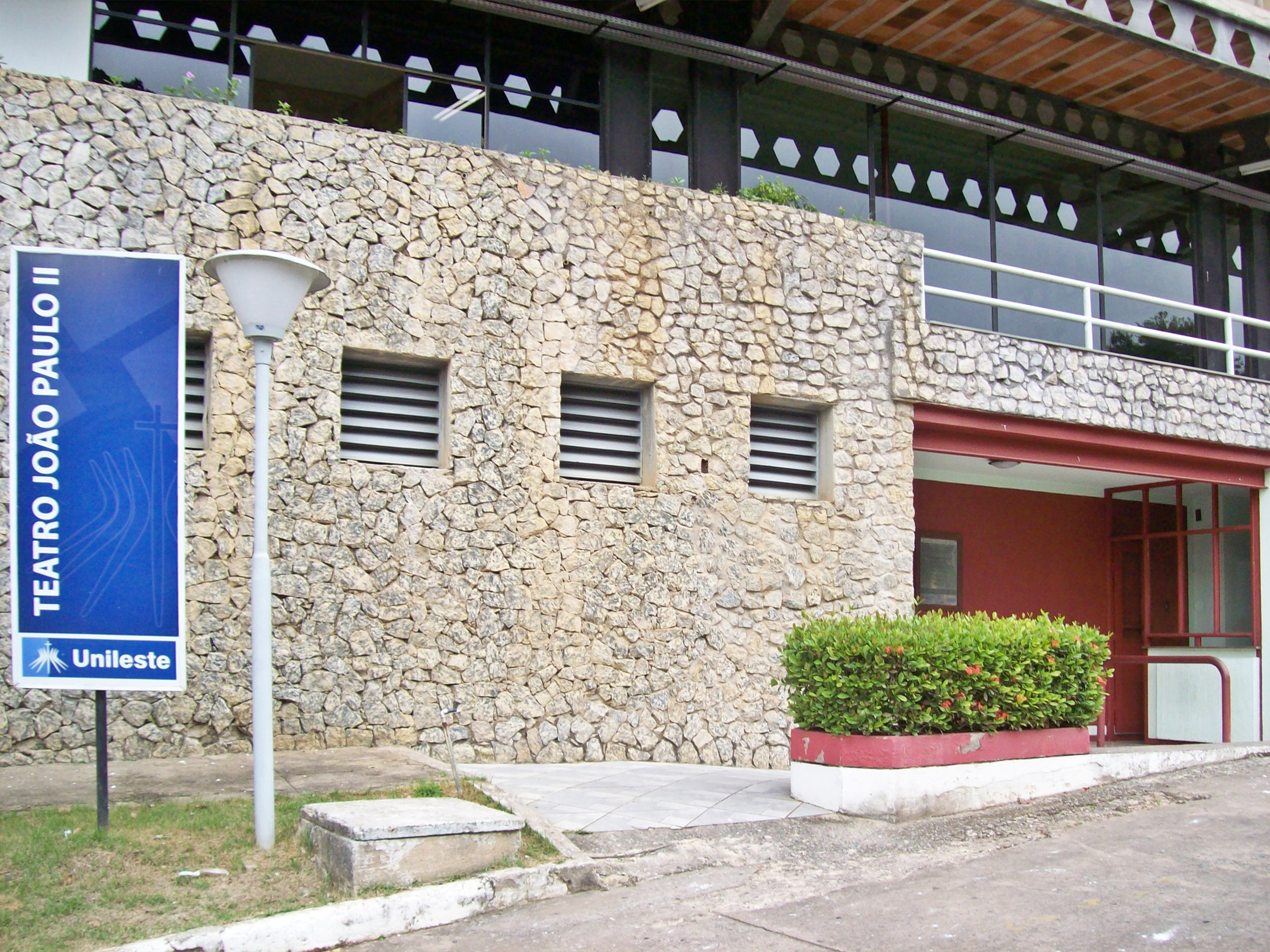
Main entrance of the João Paulo II Theater, at Padre de Man College.

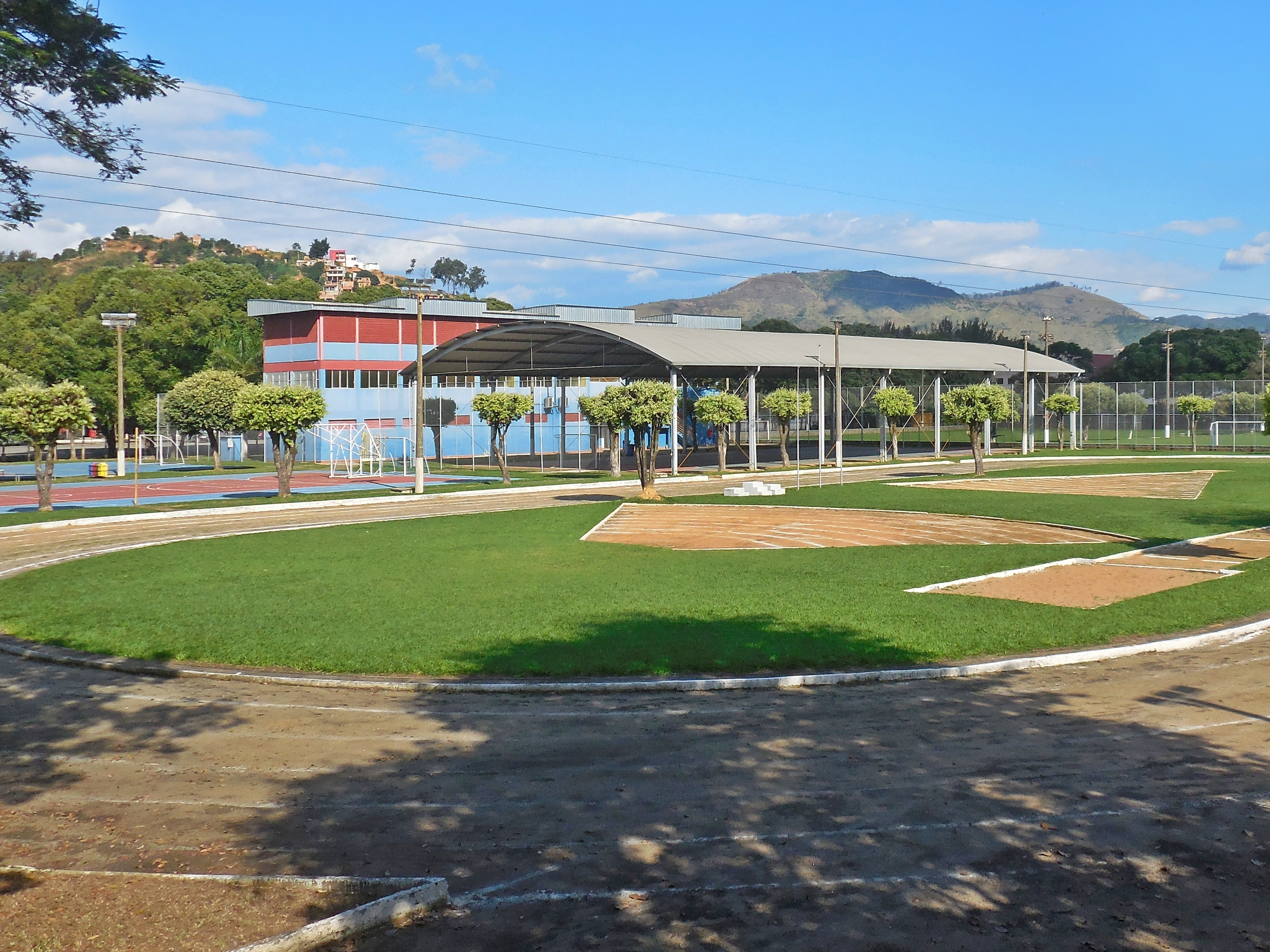
Aldir Castro Chaves Sports Center, inaugurated on May 29, 1981.

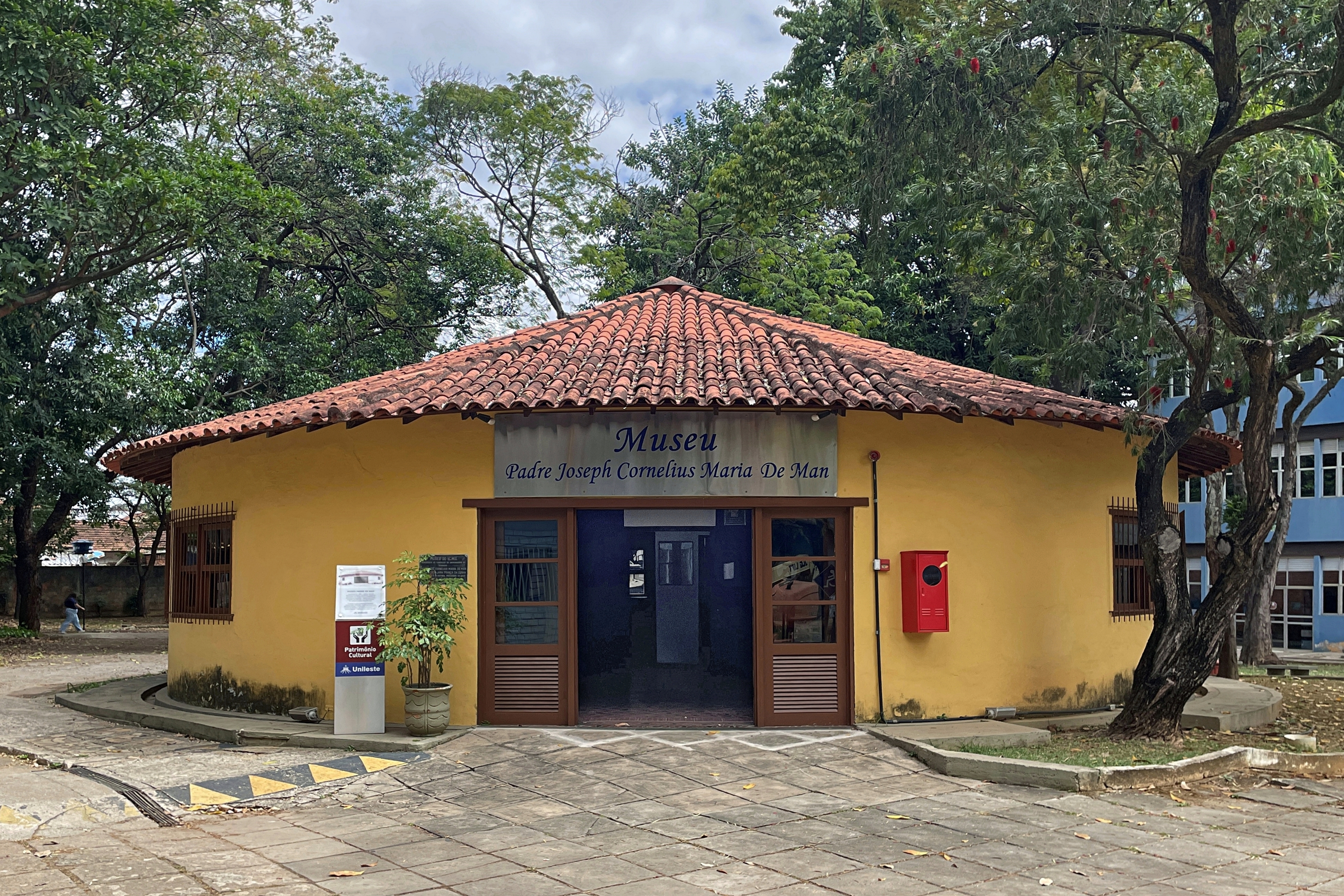
Father Joseph Cornelius Maria de Man Museum (1993)

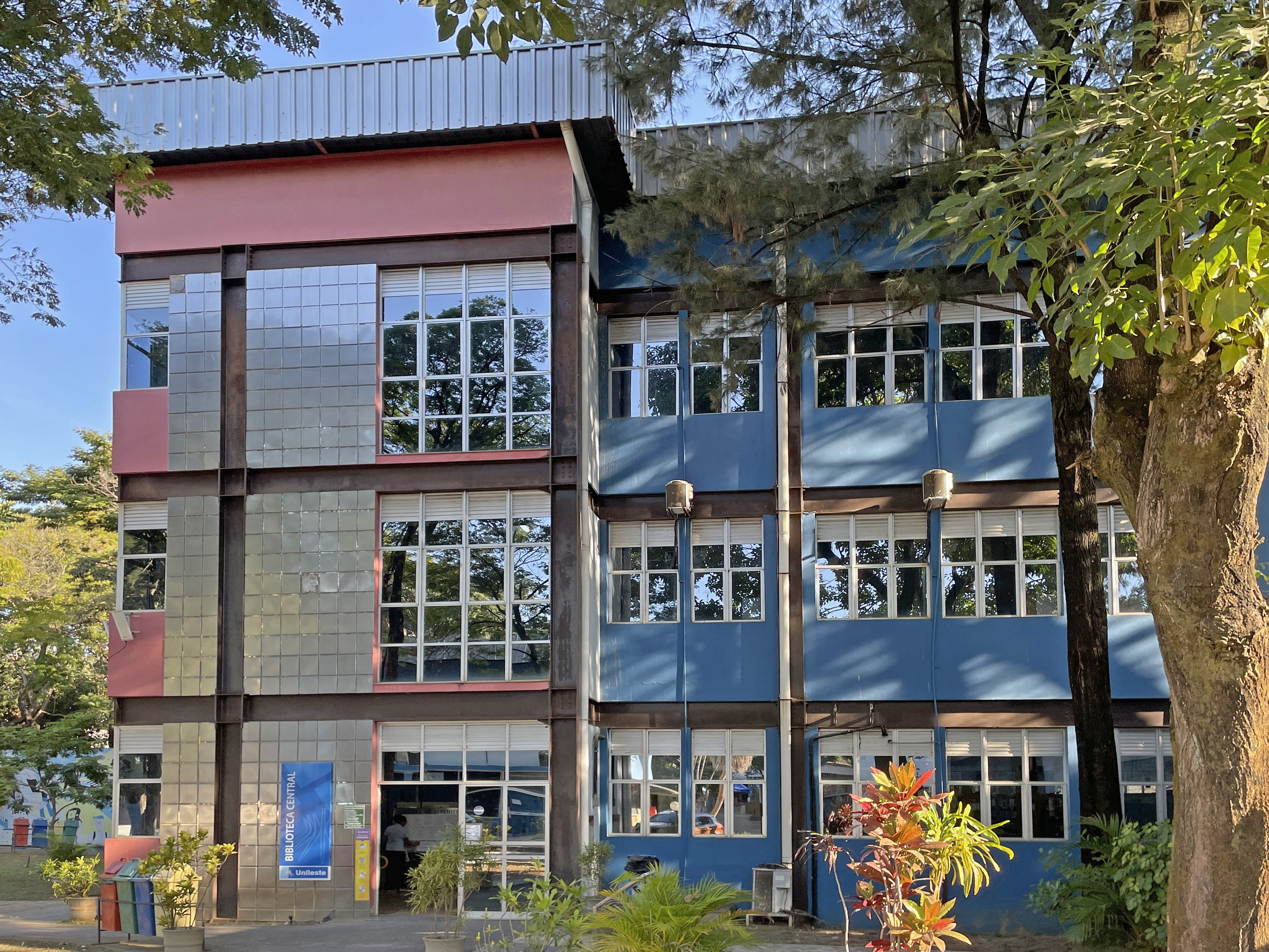
Dom Cardeal Serafim Fernandes Araújo Library (Central Library), opened on February 26, 1999.

== See also ==
- Steel Valley Metropolitan Region (RMVA)
- Coronel Fabriciano
- Pontifical Catholic University of Minas Gerais

== Bibliography ==
- Moreira, Nathalie de Castro (2008). UNILESTE: cultura organizacional e identidade (Thesis) (in Brazilian Portuguese). FPL.
- Silva, Sávio Tarso Pereira da (2019). "50 anos Unileste: o tempo revela quem sou". Archived from the original on 21 July 2020.
