= Caladinho Stream =

Brazilian watercourse

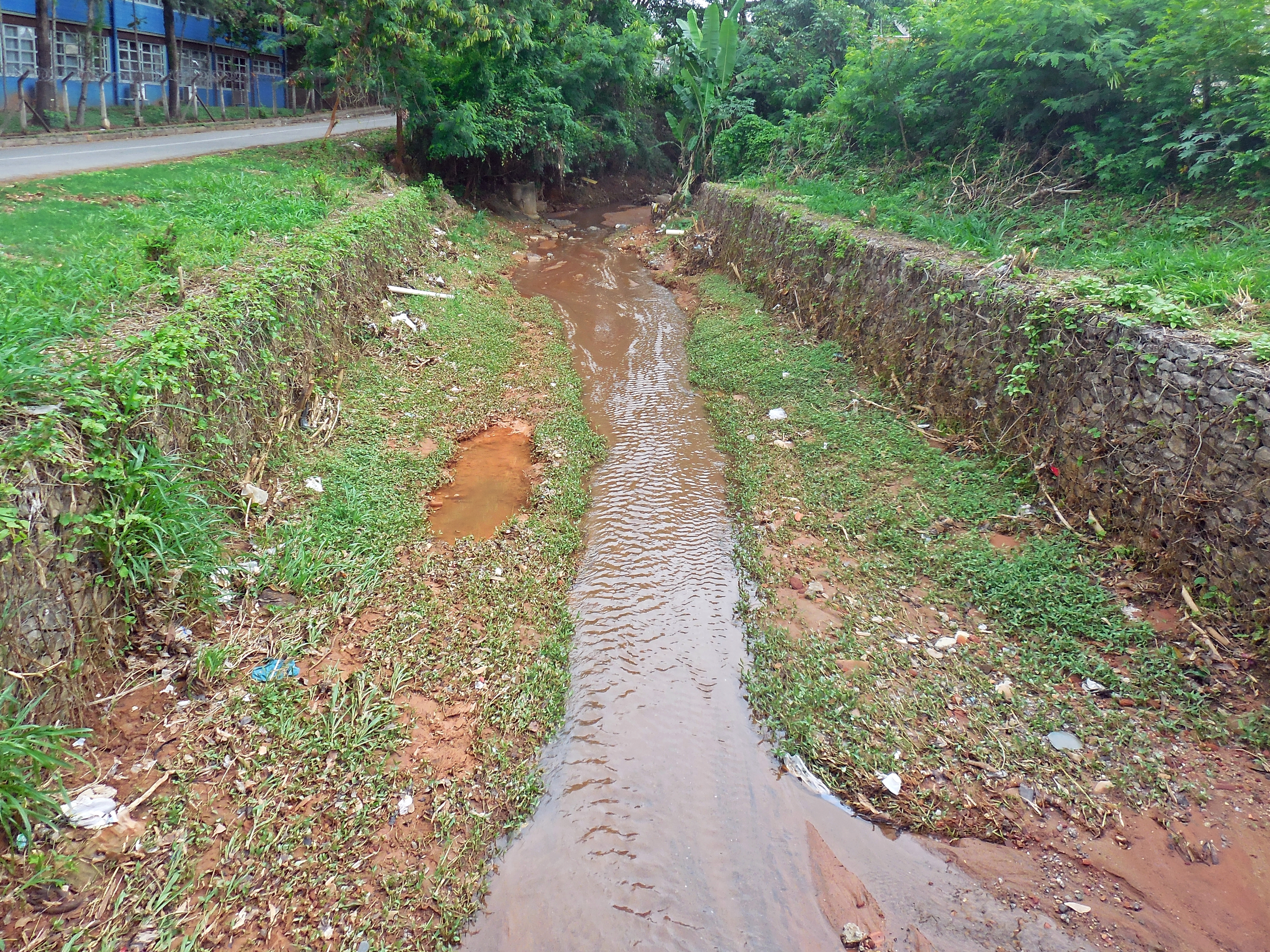
- A stretch of the Caladinho Stream in the Universitário neighborhood
- Native name: Ribeirão Caladinho (Portuguese)

Location
- Country: Brazil
- State: Minas Gerais
- Region: South America

Physical characteristics
- Source: Near the Caladinho neighborhood
- Mouth: Piracicaba River
  - coordinates: 19°31′33″S 42°36′32″W
- Length: 12km

The Caladinho Stream (Portuguese: Ribeirão Caladinho) is a watercourse that rises and flows in the Brazilian municipality of Coronel Fabriciano, in the state of Minas Gerais. The source is located near the Caladinho neighborhood and it runs for about 12 kilometers to its mouth in the Piracicaba River through the Industrial Novo Reno, Universitário, Aparecida do Norte, Morada do Vale, Aldeia do Lago and Santa Terezinha II neighborhoods. Its sub-basin covers 9 km^{2}.

Pollution and the disorderly occupation of adjacent areas, especially during the 20th century, have caused a propensity to flooding during storms. Solutions are being developed through environmental education projects in the city's schools, hillside containment, drainage and reforestation works.

== History and occupation ==
Urbanization in the area of the Caladinho Stream Sub-basin began in the 1960s, when the current Caladinho and Santa Terezinha II neighbourhoods were settled. Its name pays homage to Calado, the first name given to the current central area of Coronel Fabriciano. In the 1950s, the site underwent an earthmoving process for the implementation of the BR-381 highway (formerly MG-4), which cut through the city via Presidente Tancredo de Almeida Neves Avenue, but the stretch under federal concession was municipalized after being transferred outside the urban perimeter.

Many of the first lots in Coronel Fabriciano were located on the banks of watercourses, which were occupied without planning and resulted in a propensity to flooding during storms. Historically, Tancredo Neves Avenue has been one of the areas most affected by flooding caused by deficiencies in the flow of rainwater into the stream. The impacts of heavy rainfall were reduced after drainage works, the construction of water collection branches, the opening of galleries and gabions between 2007 and 2008.

The source of the Caladinho Stream is located in the Caladinho neighborhood, near an allotment. It runs from north to south through the neighborhoods of Industrial Novo Reno, Universitário, Aparecida do Norte, Morada do Vale, Aldeia do Lago and Santa Terezinha II, and flows into the Piracicaba River, covering a distance of around 12 km. In several stretches, including the area that intersects the interior of the campus of the Catholic University Center of Eastern Minas Gerais (Unileste), its course is channeled. Covering 9 km^{2}, its sub-basin is bordered by the Caladão Stream Sub-basin and is part of the Piracicaba River Sub-basin, which is part of the Doce River Basin.

== Ecology ==
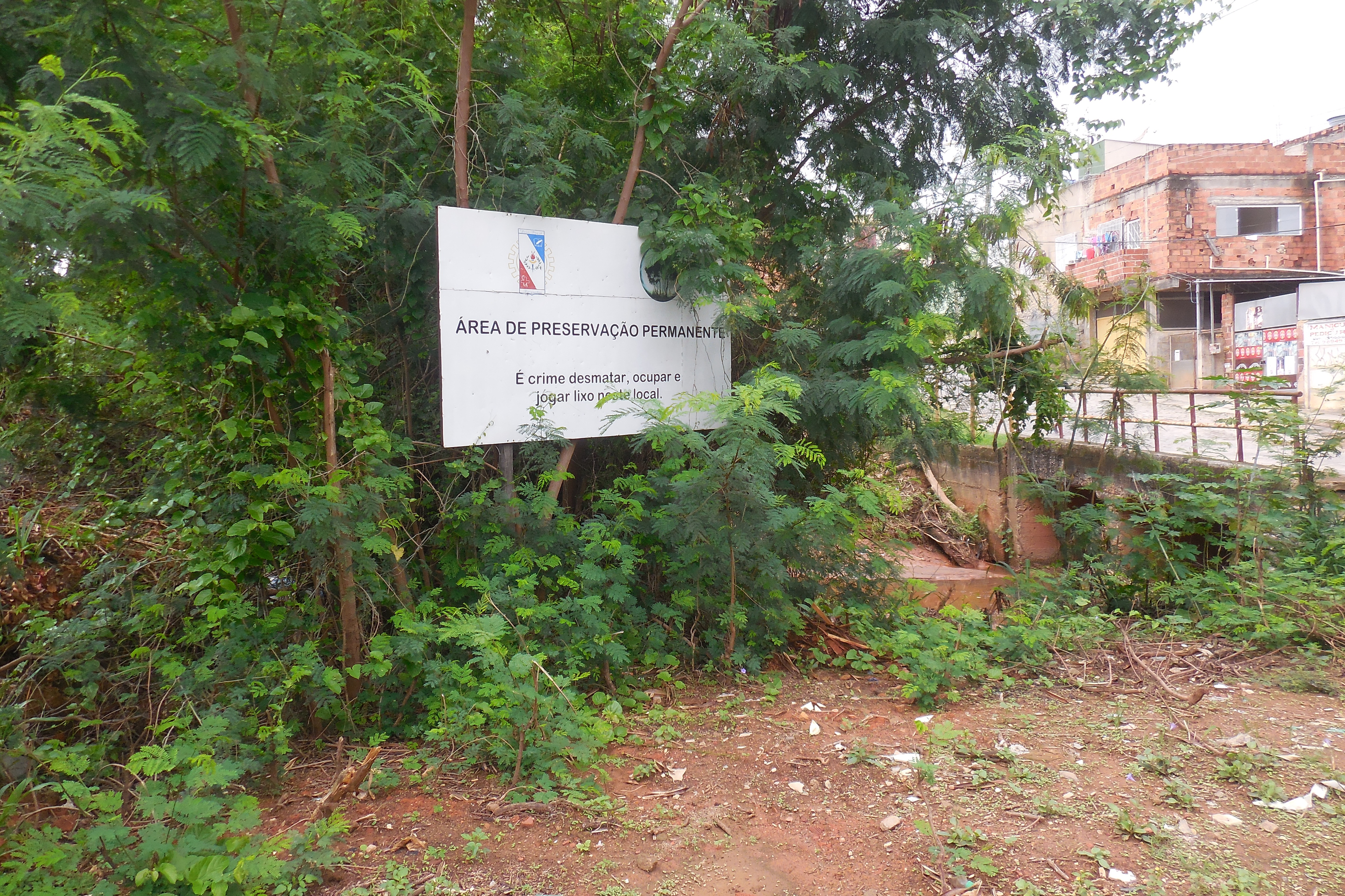
Permanent preservation area in the Caladinho Stream, in the Aparecida do Norte neighborhood.

Coronel Fabriciano's Ordinance Plan includes reforestation of the section inside the urban area, an increase in flow capacity and flood control. In 2004, the construction of a sewage treatment plant located between the Mangueiras and Santa Terezinha II neighborhoods to meet the demand from the city's waterways began to be studied. However, the project was suspended because residents in the area feared odors. In the following years, collection networks and interceptors were installed throughout the sub-basin.

Sewage from Coronel Fabriciano remained discharged directly into the watercourses bordering the urban perimeter without any management until 2019, when the construction of a treatment plant in Limoeiro, district of Timóteo, to supply 165,000 inhabitants in both cities was authorized. Despite the start of wastewater treatment, irregular dumping of garbage and debris on the banks of the spring can also be spotted in some stretches. At a distance of 300 meters from the source, the water is already considered to be outside the parameters of the National Environment Council (CONAMA) and cannot be consumed and contact avoided. There are a considerable number of people, including children, who use the water for irrigating vegetables, collecting recyclable material or even for leisure.

During the rainy season, which usually runs from October to April, the lower areas are affected by floods. Besides pollution, siltation, erosion and damage to biodiversity have been observed in the course of the stream. There are places demarcated as permanent protection areas (APP), but that have been occupied irregularly. The City Hall regularly weeds, cleans and removes debris from public spaces and provides disposal sites around the city for construction debris, furniture and branches. Environmental education projects in the city's schools, lectures, photographic exhibitions, video presentations and community meetings are held to alleviate the situation.

== Gallery ==
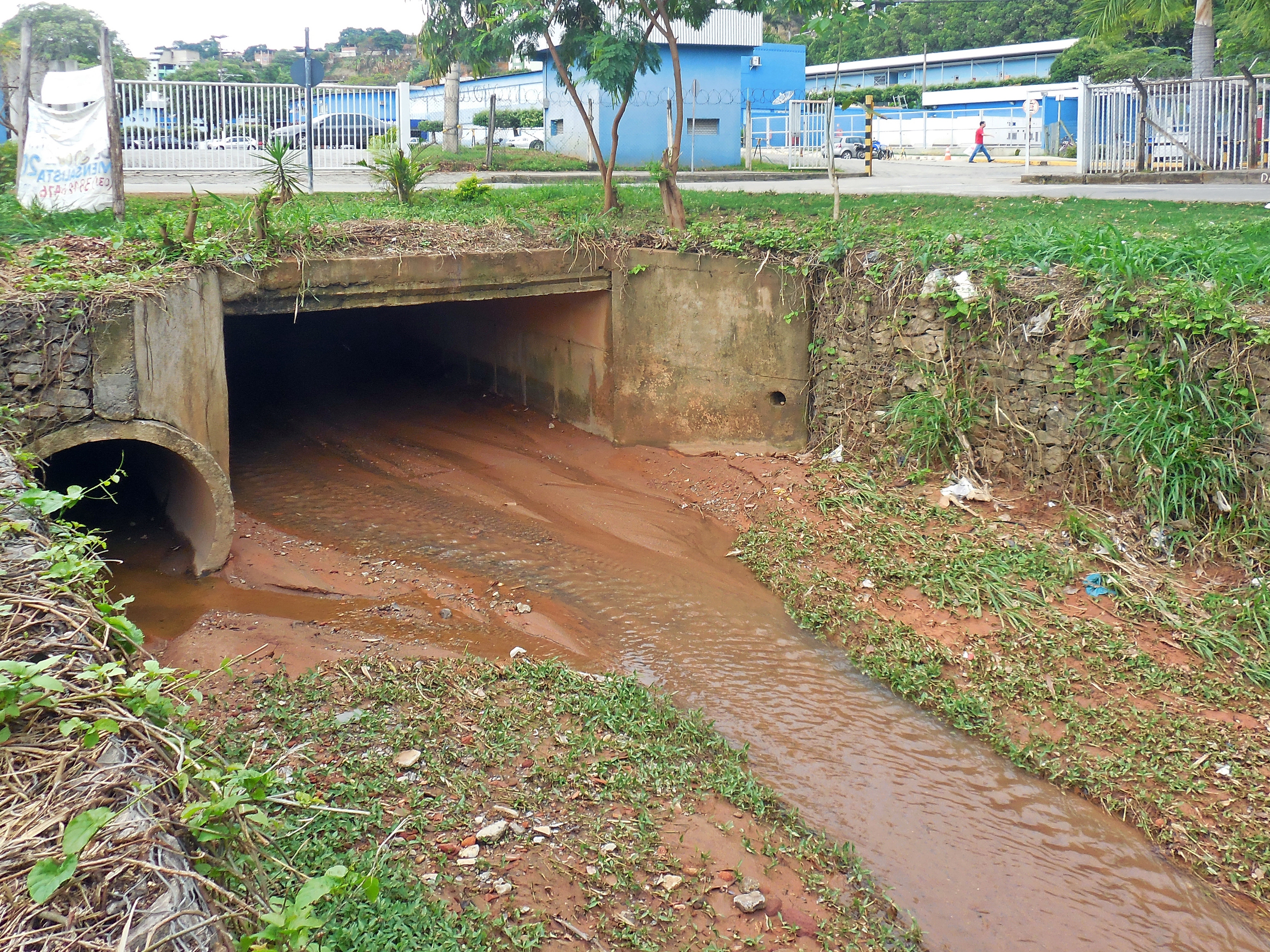
Plumbing of the Caladinho Stream.

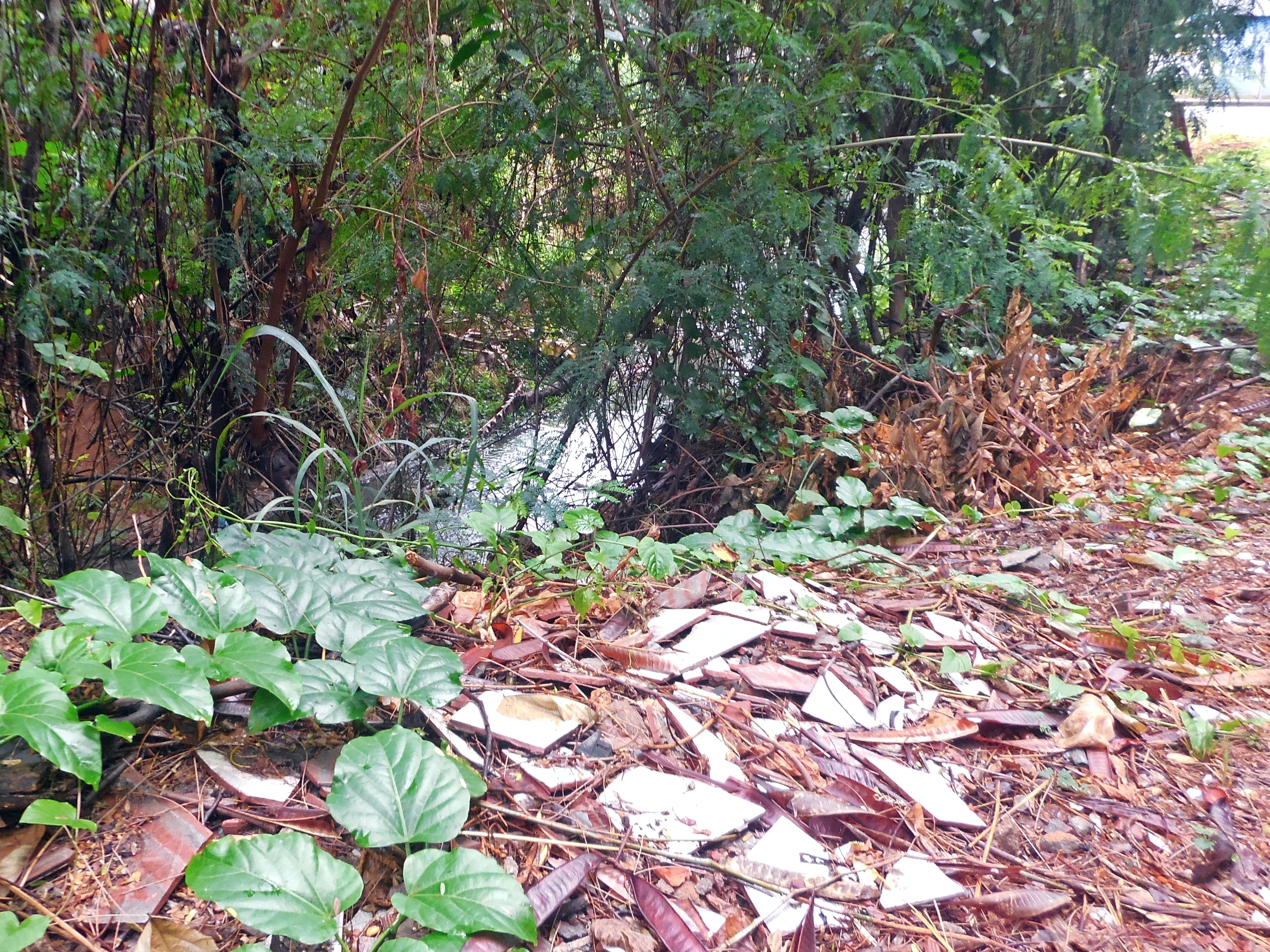
Irregular disposal of waste and rubble in the bank of the Caladinho Stream.

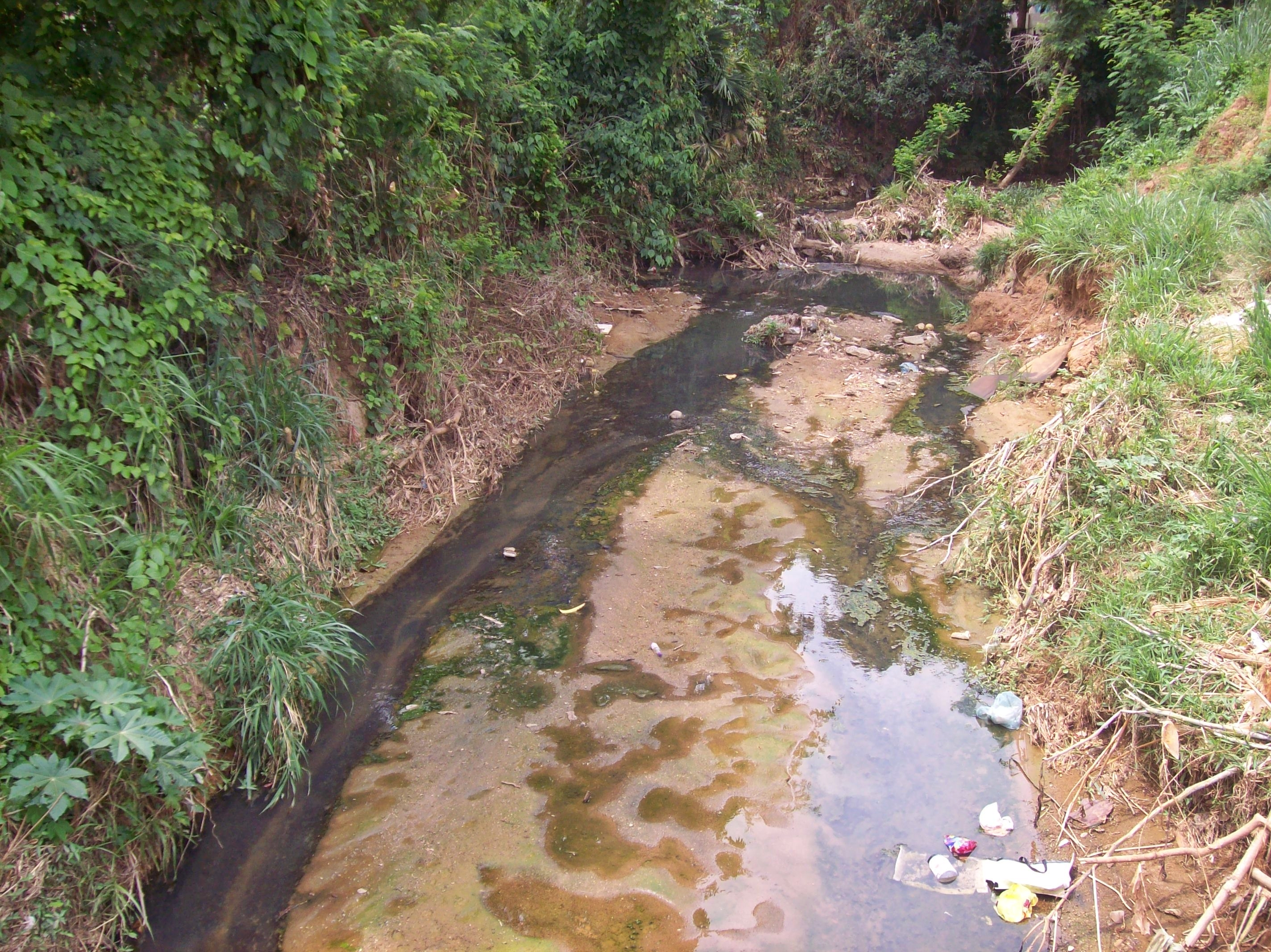
Garbage and aggradation in the Caladinho Stream between the Aparecida do Norte and Universitário neighborhoods.

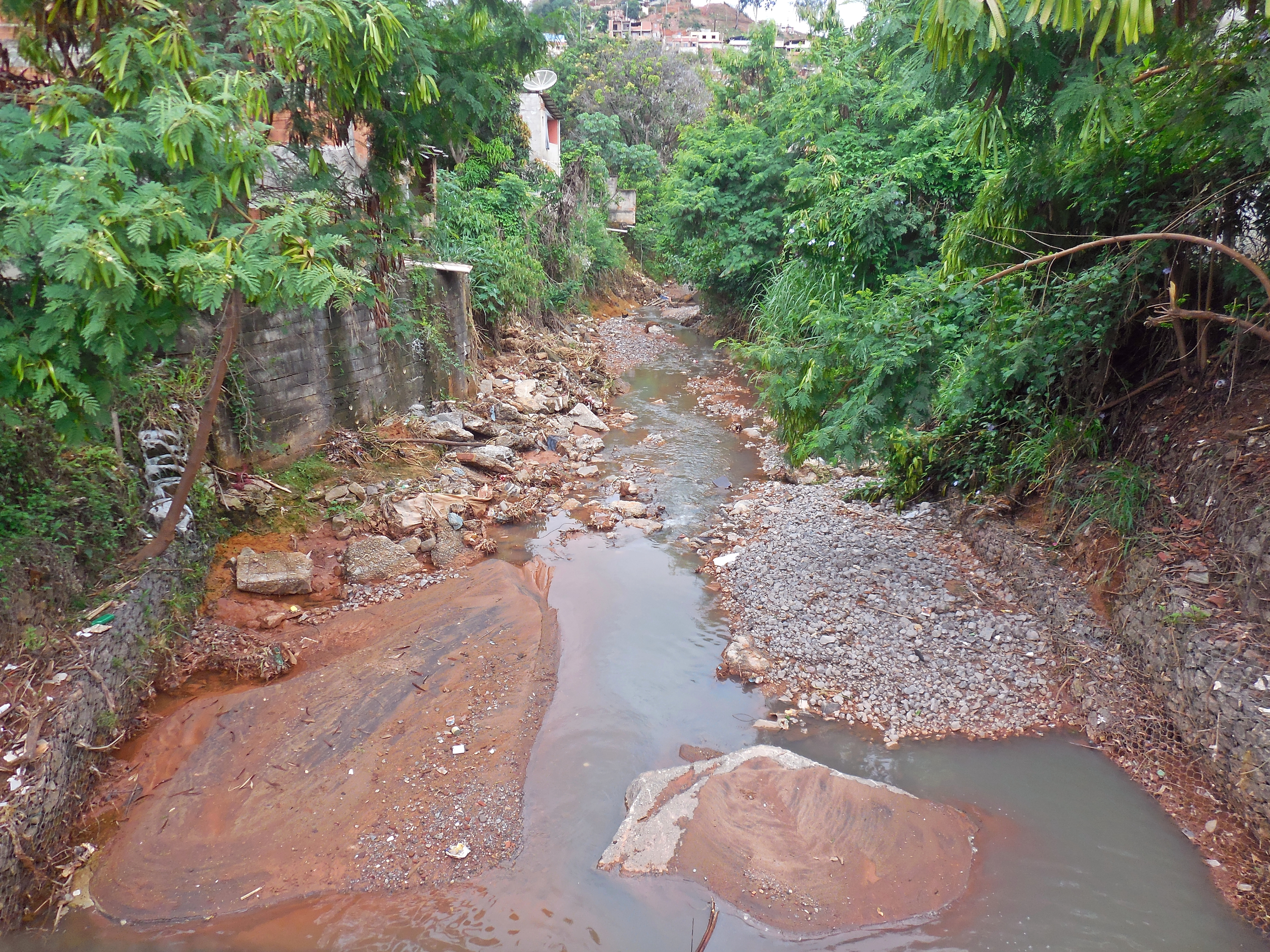
Caladinho Stream in the Universitário neighborhood.

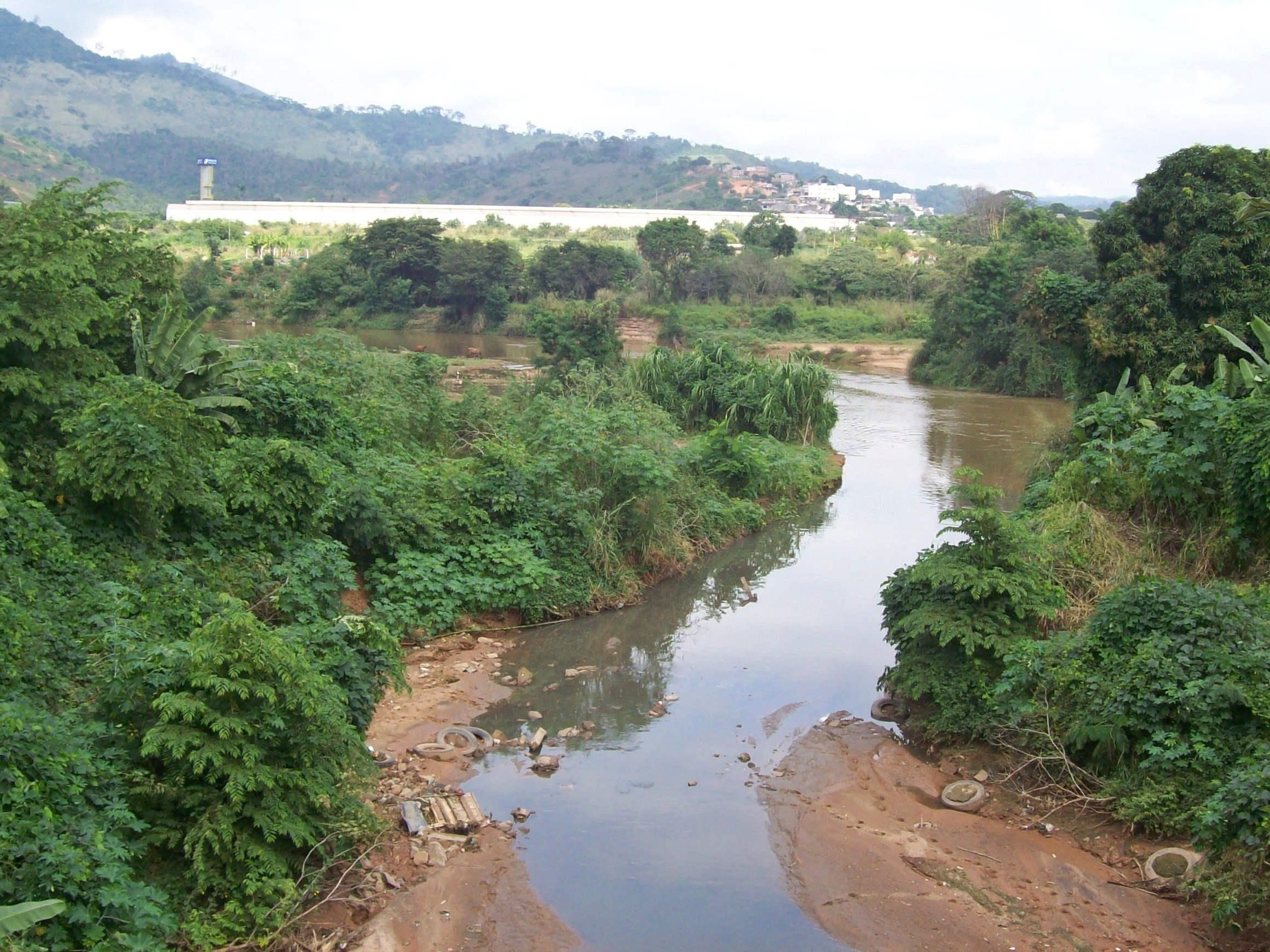
View of the river mouth of the Caladinho Stream in the Piracicaba River.

== See also ==
- History of Coronel Fabriciano
