= Marília Campos =

Brazilian politician (born 1961)

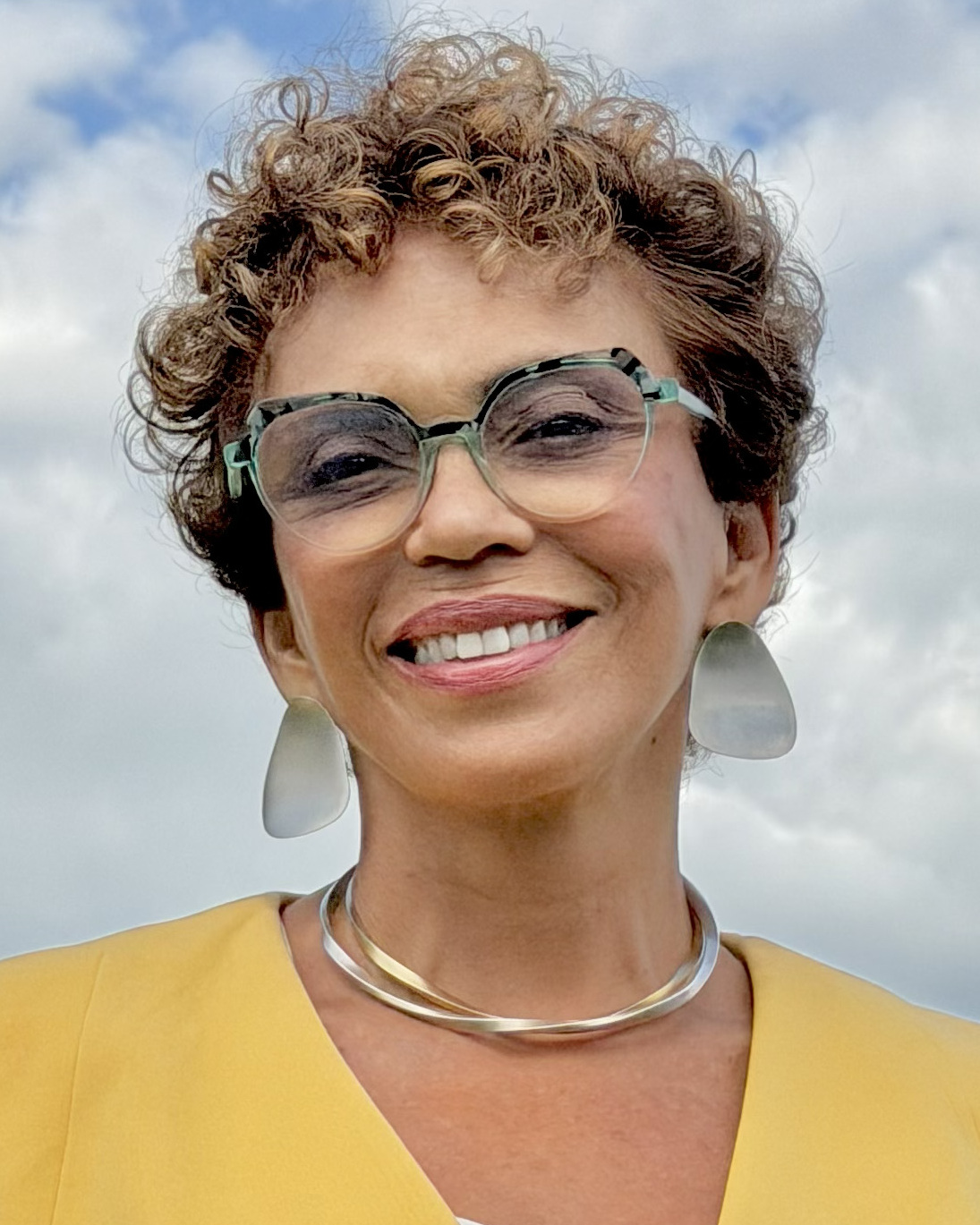
- Campos in 2026

Senator-elect for Minas Gerais
- Assuming office 1 February 2027

Mayor of Contagem
- In office 1 January 2021 – 26 March 2026
- Vice Mayor: Ricardo Faria
- Preceded by: Alex de Freitas
- Succeeded by: Ricardo Faria
- In office 1 January 2005 – 1 January 2013
- Vice Mayor: Agostinho Silveira
- Preceded by: Ademir Lucas Gomes
- Succeeded by: Carlin Moura
Other offices
Member of the Legislative Assembly of Minas Gerais
In office 1 February 2015 – 31 December 2020
Constituency	At-large
In office 1 February 2003 – 30 December 2004
Constituency	At-large
Member of the Municipal Chamber of Contagem
In office 1 January 2001 – 31 January 2003
Constituency	At-large

Personal details
- Born: Marília Aparecida Campos; 14 September 1961 (age 65) Ouro Branco, Minas Gerais, Brazil
- Party: PT (1980–present)
- Education: Federal University of Minas Gerais
- Occupation: Politician; Psychologist

Marília Aparecida Campos (born 14 September 1961), is a Brazilian politician and psychologist who is Senator-elect for Minas Gerais. A member of the Workers' Party (PT), she previously served as Mayor of Contagem, becoming the first woman to hold the position. She was elected mayor four times, in 2004, 2008, 2020, and 2024, and served three terms in the Legislative Assembly of Minas Gerais. In March 2026, she resigned as mayor to run for Federal Senate, winning election in October 2026.

== Early life and career ==
Marília Aparecida Campos was born on 14 Semptember 1961, in Ouro Branco, Minas Gerais. She moved to the Triângulo Mineiro region in childhood and worked as a bank employee in Uberlândia. She holds a degree in psychology from the Federal University of Minas Gerais.

=== Trade union career ===
In the early 1980s, Campos became politically active through Catholic groups influenced by liberation theology. She subsequently became involved in student movements and then trade unionism. Campos joined the Workers' Party (PT) in 1980 and participated in the establishment the Central Única dos Trabalhadores (CUT) and of local PT branches in the Uberlândia area.

Following her marriage to fellow trade unionist José Prata de Araújo, Campos settled in Contagem, in the Belo Horizonte metropolitan area. She was part of a CUT-aligned opposition slate that won control of the Belo Horizonte bank workers' union from leadership affiliated with the rival Central Geral dos Trabalhadores (CGT). She served first as a union director and later as president for two terms, from 1990 to 1995. She represented the union in wage negotiations with the Brazilian Federation of Banks (FEBRABAN). After leaving union leadership she returned to work as a bank teller.

=== Early political career ===
Campos first ran for elected office in 199 as the PT candidate for mayor of Contagem. She placed third with 43,935 votes (18.32%), losing to Newton Cardoso of the PMDB.

In 1998, Campos unsuccessfully ran for a seat in the Legislative Assembly of Minas Gerais. In 2000 she was elected to the Municipal Chamber of Contagem with more votes than any other PT candidate. In 2002, Campos won a seat in the Legislative Assembly.

== Mayor of Contagem (2005–2012) ==
In 2004, Campos was elected mayor of Contagem, defeating incumbent Ademir Lucas of the Brazilian Social Democracy Party (PSDB) in a runoff with 59.7% of the vote. She became the first woman elected mayor of the city.

Her administration introduced participatory budgeting and expanded municipal policy councils. The PT has credited her two terms with investment in health care, infrastructure, sanitation, housing and infrastructure.

Campos was reelected in 2008, again defeating Lucas in a runoff with 56.88% of the vote. She became the first mayor of Contagem to win reelection.

According to the municipal government, the city received multiple awards during this period. She was mayor during the centenary of the city's political emancipation in 2011.

Ineligible for a third consecutive term in 2012, Campos supported PT candidate Durval Ângelo, who lost a runoff to Carlin Moura of the Communist Party (PCdoB).

== Electoral history ==
Year	Election	Party	Office	Coalition	Partners	Party	Votes	Percent	Result	Ref.
1996	Contagem Mayoral Election	PT	Mayor				43,935	18.32%	Not elected	
2000	Contagem Municipal Chamber Election	PT	City Councillor	Popular Front of Contagem (PT, PV, PSTU)	—N/a		3,463	1.19%	Elected	
2002	State Elections of Minas Gerais	PT	State Deputy	Nilmário, governor (PT, PL, PCdoB, PMN, PCB)	—N/a		45,625	0.48%	Elected	
2004	Contagem Mayoral Election	PT	Mayor	Contagem Wants Change (PT, PL, PTN, PSB, PCdoB)	Agostinho Silveira	PL	120,693	36.42%	Runoff; 1st round	
2004	Contagem Mayoral Election	PT	Mayor	Contagem Wants Change (PT, PL, PTN, PSB, PCdoB)	Agostinho Silveira	PL	183,515	59.71%	Elected; 2nd round	
2008	Contagem Mayoral Election	PT	Mayor	Democratic Popular Contagem _{(PT, PPS, PSL, PHS)}	Agostinho Silveira	PPS	132,154	43.87%	Runoff; 1st round	
2008	Contagem Mayoral Election	PT	Mayor	Democratic Popular Contagem _{(PT, PPS, PSL, PHS)}	Agostinho Silveira	PPS	174,198	56.88%	Elected; 2nd round	
2014	State Elections of Minas Gerais	PT	State Deputy	Minas for Everyone (PT, PROS, PMDB, PRB)	—N/a		78,801	0.76%	Elected	
2018	State Elections of Minas Gerais	PT	State Deputy	Together with the People (PT, PCdoB, PSB, DC, PR)	—N/a		71,329	0.70%	Elected	
2020	Contagem Mayoral Election	PT	Mayor	Contagem Happy Again (PT, MDB, PCdoB, PSB)	Ricardo Faria	MDB	118,955	41.83%	Runoff; 1st round	
2020	Contagem Mayoral Election	PT	Mayor	Contagem Happy Again (PT, MDB, PCdoB, PSB)	Ricardo Faria	MDB	147,768	51.35%	Elected; 2nd round	
2024	Contagem Mayoral Election	PT	Mayor	Together for Contagem (Brazil of Hope (PT, PCdoB, PV), PSOL REDE Federation (PSOL, REDE), Always Forward (PSDB, Cidadania), PSD, PSB, PDT, PP, Solidariedade, União Brasil, MDB)	Ricardo Faria	PSD	188,228	60.68%	Elected; 1st round	
2026	State Elections of Minas Gerais	PT	Senator	For Minas Gerais to Dream Again (Brazil of Hope (PT, PCdoB, PV), PSB, PSOL REDE Federation (PSOL, REDE))	Luciana Duca Costa	PSB	3,990,864	19.44%	Elected	(Note: Costa and Cintra were elected as alternates on the same ticket as Campos.)
2026	State Elections of Minas Gerais	PT	Senator	For Minas Gerais to Dream Again (Brazil of Hope (PT, PCdoB, PV), PSB, PSOL REDE Federation (PSOL, REDE))	Laércio Cintra	PSB	3,990,864	19.44%	Elected	(Note: Costa and Cintra were elected as alternates on the same ticket as Campos.)

== Notes ==
Political offices
Preceded by Ademir Lucas Gomes	Mayor of Contagem; 2005–2013	Succeeded by Carlin Moura
Preceded by Ricardo Faria	Mayor of Contagem; 2021–2026	Succeeded by Alex de Freitas
