= Graciano Atienza Fernández =

Spanish journalist, lawyer and politician

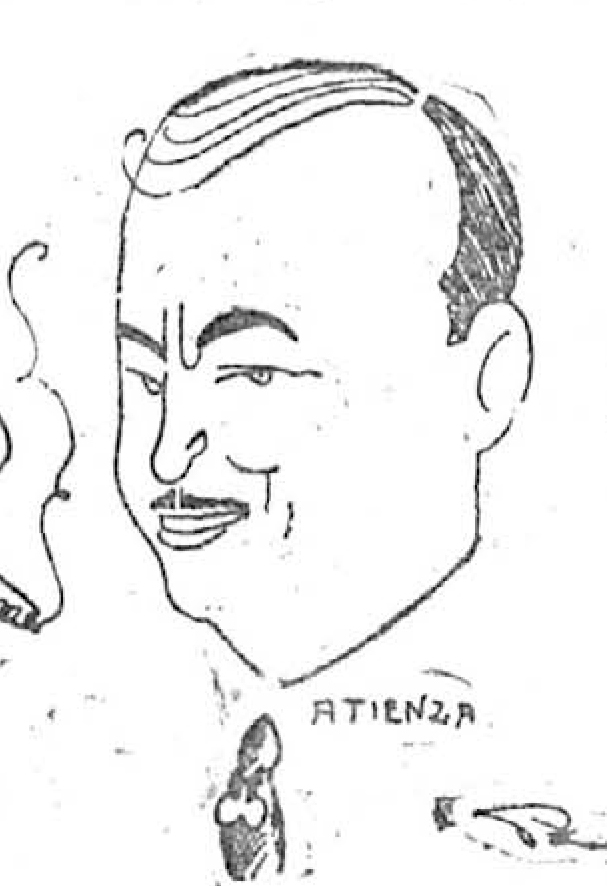
Graciano Atienza Fernández

Graciano Atienza Fernández ( 18 December 1884 – 3 November 1935) was a Spanish journalist, lawyer and politician.

== National Journalism Award Graciano Atienza ==
In 1959, his widow, Mrs. Mary Gullón, instituted in his memory the National Journalism Award Graciano Atienza.
