= Graxa =

Brazilian footballer (born 1993)

Personal information
- Full name: Graciano Junior Gonçalves
- Date of birth: 8 October 1993 (age 33)
- Place of birth: Contagem, Brazil
- Height: 1.77 m (5 ft 10 in)
- Position: Defensive midfielder

Youth career
- 2004–2009: Atlético Mineiro
- 2009–2011: São José-SP
- 2012: Náutico

Senior career*
| Years | Team | Apps | (Gls) |
| 2012 | Náutico | 0 | (0) |
| 2013–2015 | Bragantino | 10 | (0) |
| 2013 | → União Barbarense (loan) | 0 | (0) |
| 2015 | Caldas | 9 | (2) |
| 2016 | CRAC | 7 | (0) |
| 2016 | Marbella | 6 | (0) |
| 2017 | Mamoré | ? | (?) |
| 2017 | Rio Branco | 0 | (0) |
| 2018 | Central | 4 | (0) |
| 2018 | → Santa Helena (loan) | | |
| 2019 | Real | | |
| 2019 | Portuguesa | | |
- * Club domestic league appearances and goals as of 22:48, 24 April 2019 (UTC)

Graciano Junior Gonçalves (born 8 October 1993), commonly known as Graxa, is a Brazilian professional footballer who plays as a defensive midfielder.

== Career ==
Graxa was born in Contagem, Minas Gerais, and represented Atlético Mineiro, São José-SP and Náutico as a youth. Known as Graciano with the latter, he made his senior debut on 7 March 2012, coming on as a second half substitute for Rodrigo Tiuí in a 2–0 Campeonato Pernambucano home win against Porto.

In January 2013 Graxa moved to Bragantino, but after being rarely used, moved on loan to União Barbarense ahead of the year's Copa Paulista. He returned to his parent club on 3 October, making his Série B debut six days later by coming on in the 19th minute of a 3–5 away loss against Ceará.

On 26 October 2013, Graxa appeared in a 0–3 loss at Avaí, and was suspended for 180 days after a heavy challenge on Héracles. Upon returning, he was sparingly used, and released in 2015.

After leaving the Massa Bruta, Graxa represented Caldas Esporte Clube and CRAC before moving abroad on 18 July 2016, after signing for Marbella FC. He left the club on 22 December 2016.
