= Contagem =

- Municipality
- Municipality of Contagem
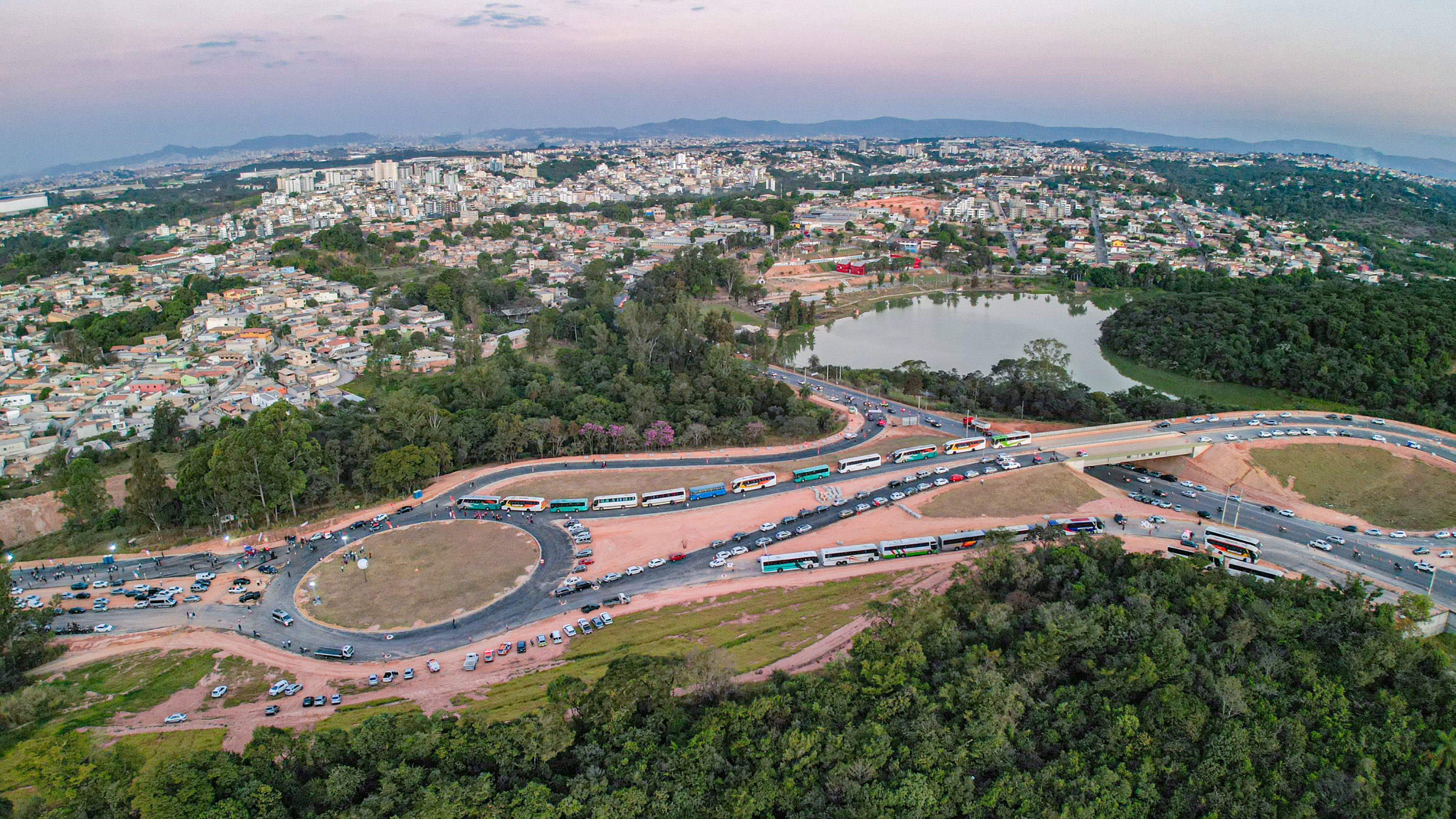
- Skyline of Contagem

- Flag Coat of arms
- Nickname: Contagem das Abóboras
- Motto: Per Populum Omnis Potestas A Deo
- Location in Minas Gerais

- Location within Brazil
- Coordinates: 19°55′55″S 44°03′14″W
- Country: Brazil
- Region: Southeast
- State: Minas Gerais
- Founded: 1716

Government
  - Mayor: Marília Campos (PT)

Area
  - Total: 194.586 km^{2} (75.130 sq mi)
- Elevation: 858 m (2,815 ft)

Population (2022 Census)
  - Total: 621,863
  - Estimate (2025): 651,718
  - Density: 3,195.83/km^{2} (8,277.15/sq mi)
- Time zone: UTC−3 (BRT)
- Postal Code: 32000-000
- Area code: +55 31
- HDI (2010): 0.756 – high
- Website: www.contagem.mg.gov.br

Contagem (Portuguese pronunciation: [kõˈtaʒẽj]) is a city in the center of the state of Minas Gerais, in Brazil. It is only 21 kilometres (13 miles) from the capital, Belo Horizonte, and forms part of a metropolitan area with a population of 4.8 million. The city has a population of 651,718, making it the state’s third-most-populous city after Belo Horizonte and Uberlandia.

Over time, the city's geographic boundaries were lost due to its horizontal growth towards the capital, causing intense conurbation with Belo Horizonte. Contagem is part of the Greater Belo Horizonte area and is one of the most important cities in this urban agglomeration, mainly due to its large industrial park. Its road system, designed to accommodate an intense flow of vehicles and cargo, is made up of the country's main highways, BR-381 (Fernão Dias - access to São Paulo), BR-262 (access to Vitória and Triângulo Mineiro) and BR-040 (access to Brasília and Rio de Janeiro).

== Geography ==
The city belongs to the metropolitan mesoregion and to the microregion of Belo Horizonte, has a territorial extension of 195.2 square kilometres (75.4 square miles), and borders the municipalities of Ribeirão das Neves, Esmeraldas, Betim, Ibirité and Belo Horizonte. The elevation of the city hall is 939 metres (3,081 feet).

== Demography ==
According to estimates from 2020 the municipal population was 668,949 making it the third most populous city in the state of Minas Gerais, after Belo Horizonte and Uberlândia.

The population is very young with 86% of the population being less than 50 years old.

Education indicators:

- adults with up to 10 years of education: 23.67%
- young people between 10 and 14 years old attending school: 96.8%
- adults with no formal schooling: 5.21%
- young people ages between 15 and 17 enrolled in secondary education: 83.7%
- adults who have studied some university: 23%
- illiteracy rate for adults over 25: 7%

Color/Race	Percentage
Mixed	48.6%
White	38.9%
Black	10.1%
Asian	1.3%
Amerindian	0.1%

Source: Census 2010

== Economy ==
Contagem is primarily a city of heavy industry with a diversified industrial complex; even though minerals processing and chemicals still have a large importance. The municipality is responsible for 5.28% of the state GDP, occupying third place after Belo Horizonte and Betim.

Serious problems with water and air pollution exist, and the Pampulha Lake (Belo Horizonte) receives large quantities of heavy metals from the city.

Contagem was the first industrial district built in Minas Gerais. Inaugurated in 1946, by 1950 it was the largest in the state. The Gafanhoto power plant (on the Pará River) was built by the state government in 1952 to provide for the implementation and development of the district, which is still the largest industrial region in Minas Gerais.

Ceasa Minas Greater BH (regional wholesale supply center) is in Contagem. It has a built area of 605,000m^{2}, with 535 companies installed, and a public on busy days of 65,000 people. It is the largest in vegetables in all of Brazil.

== Sister city ==
Cuba Cienfuegos

Carmelo is a sister city in Cuba.

== Notable people ==
- Gilson Bernardo (born 1968), volleyball player
- Arlene Xavier (born 1969), volleyball player
- Ramon Menezes (born 1972), footballer
- Glaydson (born 1979), defensive midfielder
- Rafael Pereira (born 1997), athlete
- Serginho (born 1986), footballer
- Philipe Fidélis dos Santos (born 1989), footballer
- Jonathan Reis (born 1990), footballer
- Raquel Fernandes (born 1991), footballer
- Ricardo Lucarelli (born 1992), volleyball player
- Graxa (born 1993), footballer
- Kay (born 1999), 2-time UR2D Sunday League World Champion

== See also ==
- List of municipalities in Minas Gerais
