= Ipatinga =

City in Minas Gerais, Brazil

- Municipality
- Municipality of Ipatinga
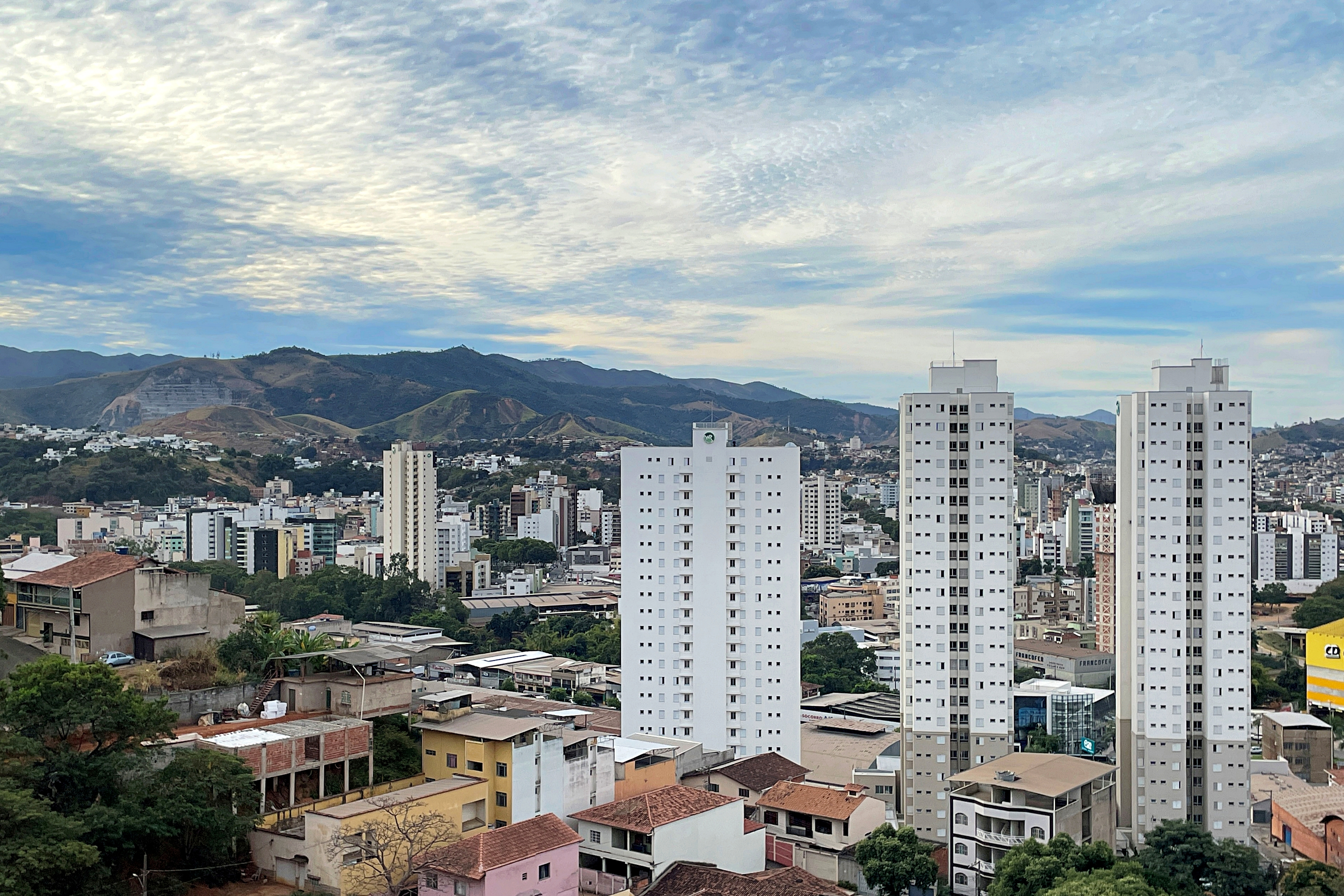
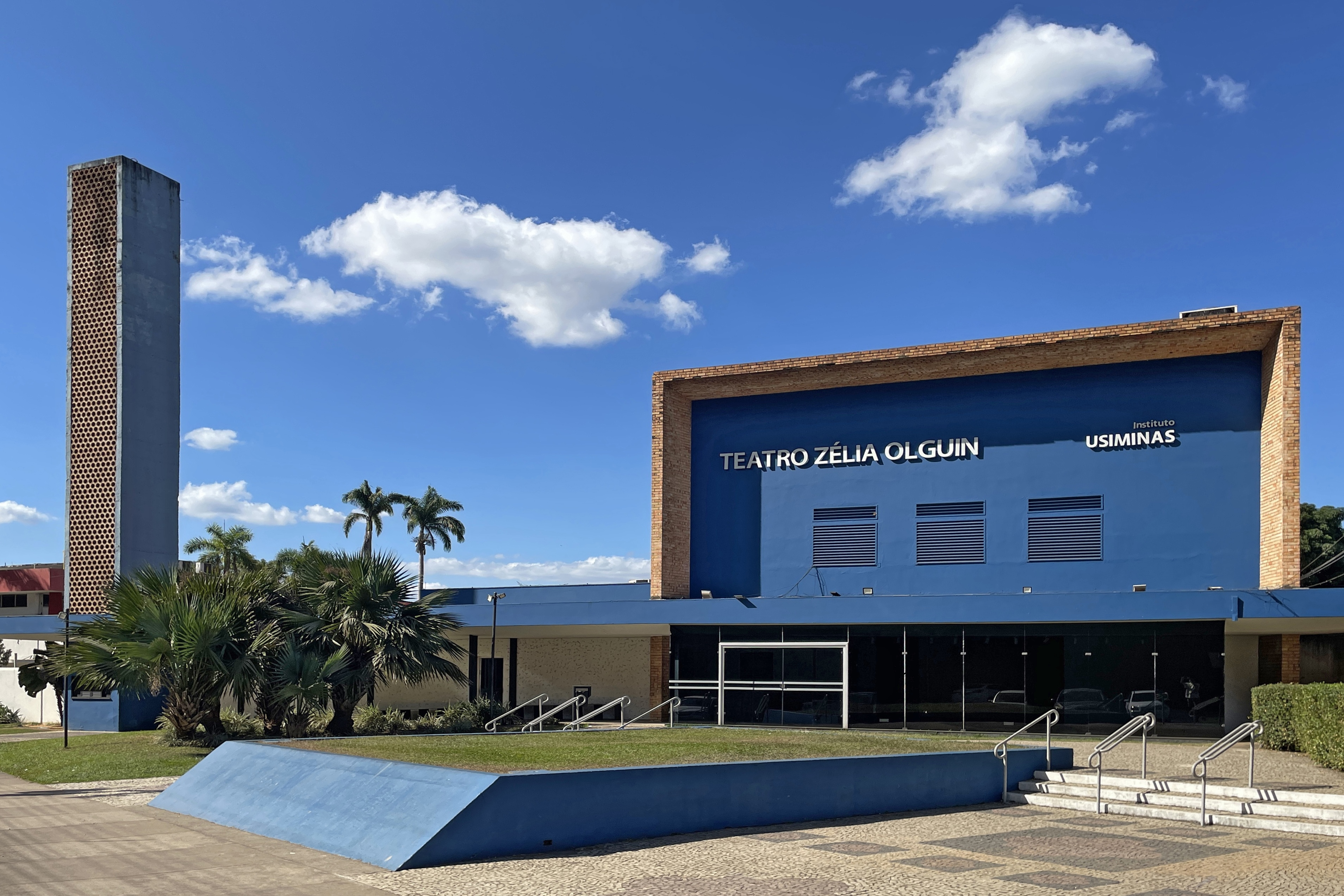
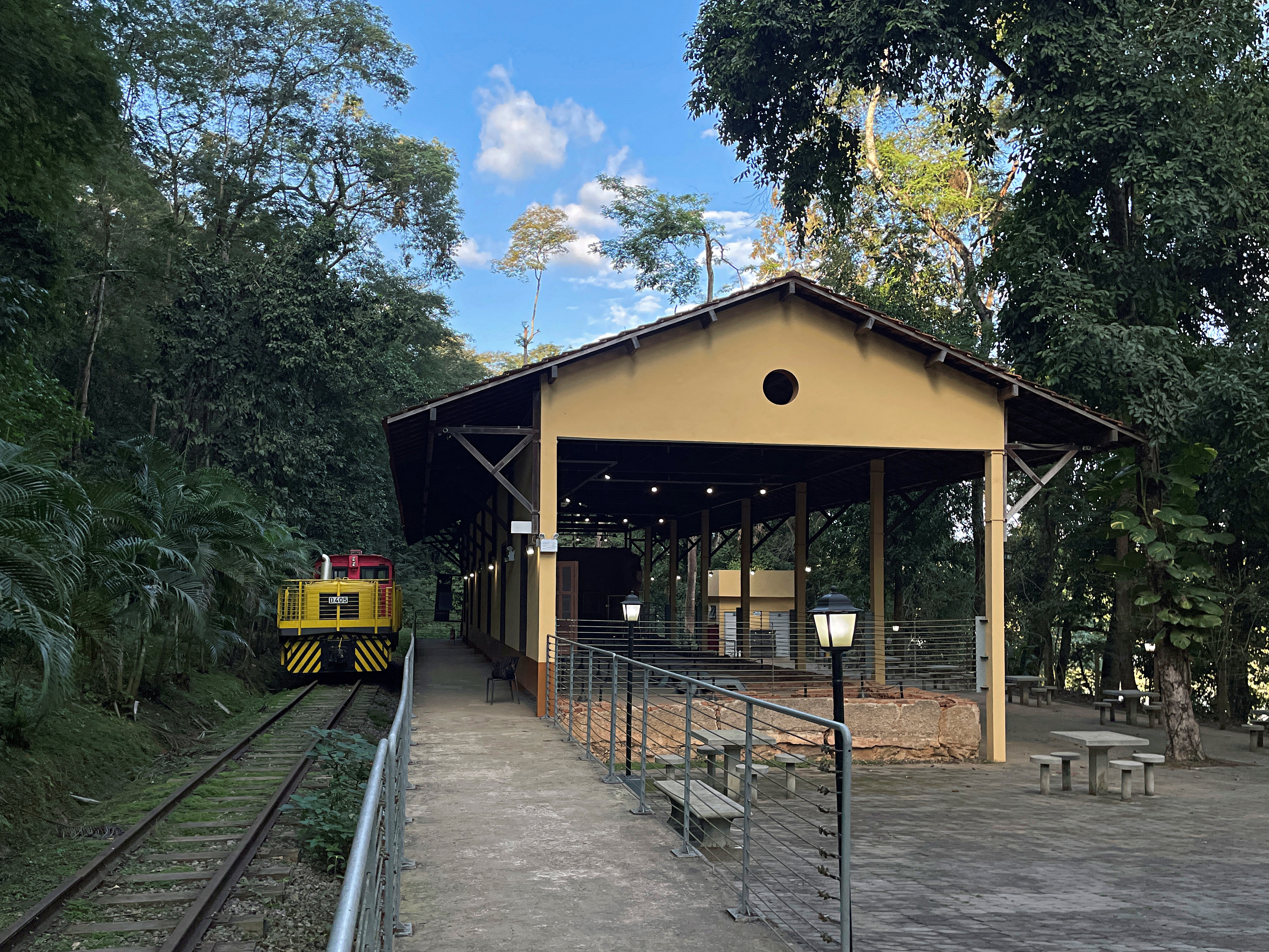
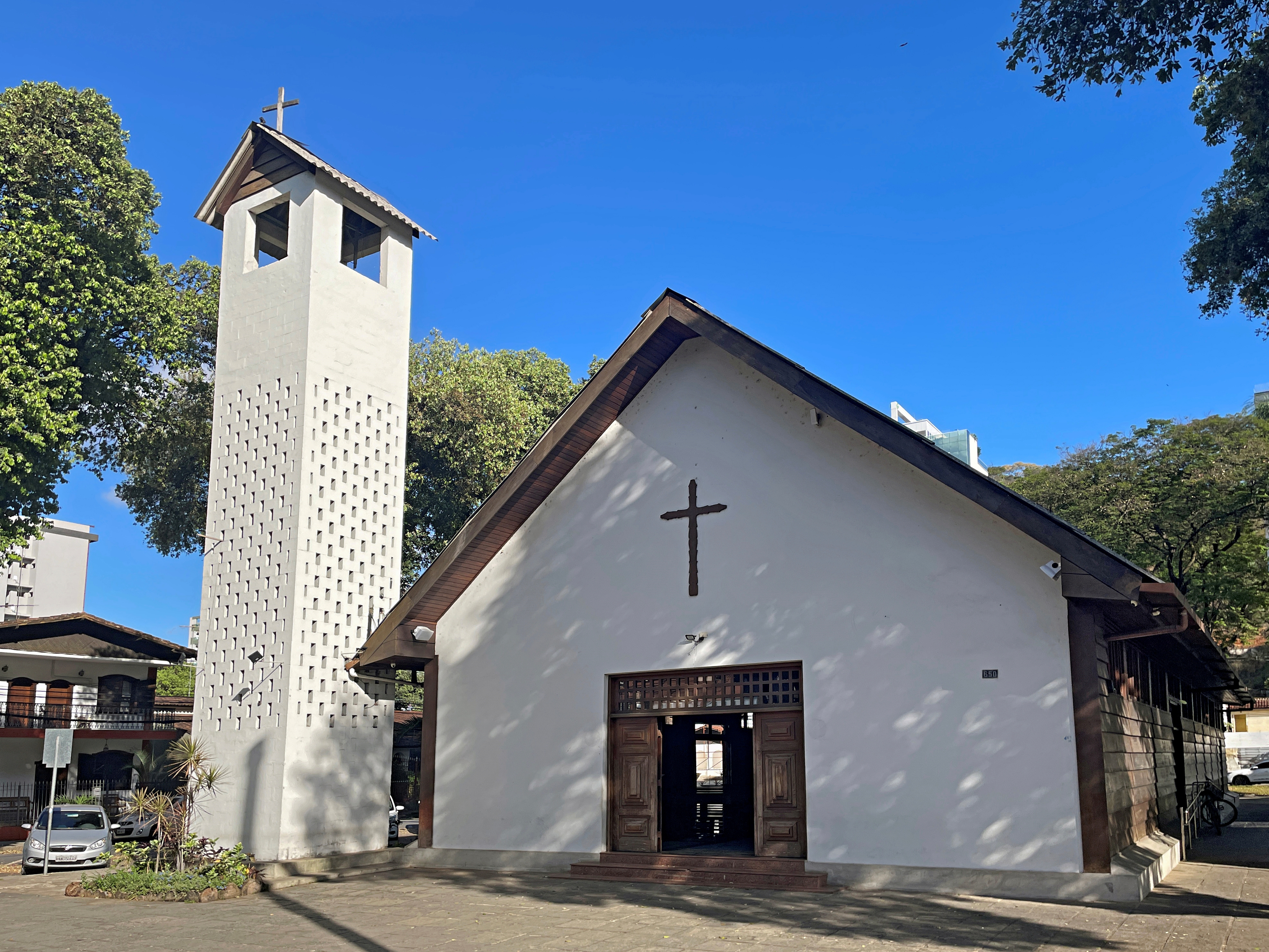
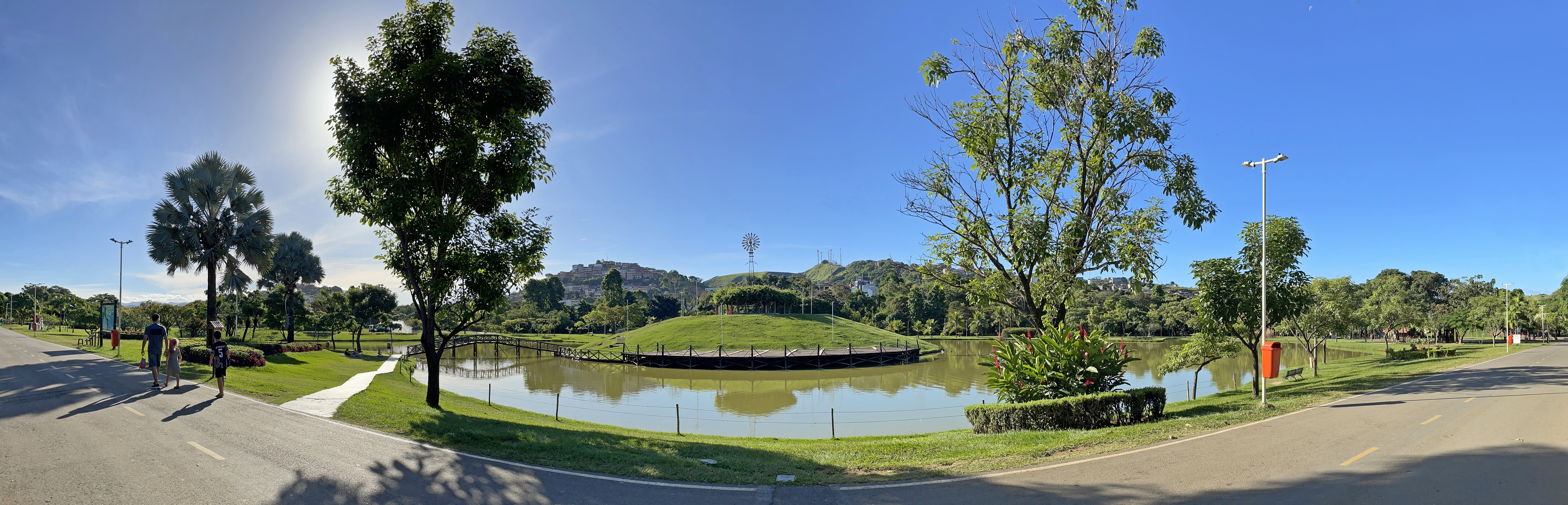
- From top to bottom, left to right: buildings between the Iguaçu and Cidade Nobre neighborhoods; Zélia Olguin Theater; a section of Pedro Linhares Gomes Avenue; town hall of Ipatinga; Pedra Mole train station; Nossa Senhora da Esperança Church in Horto; and Ipanema Park.

- Flag Coat of arms
- Motto(s): Confiança, Trabalho, Progresso "Confidence, Labour, Progress"
- Location in Minas Gerais
- Coordinates: 19°28′04″S 42°32′13″W
- Country: Brazil
- State: Minas Gerais
- Region: Southeast
- Intermediate Region: Ipatinga
- Immediate Region: Ipatinga
- Metropolitan region: Vale do Aço
- Neighboring municipalities: West: Coronel Fabriciano; North: Mesquita and Santana do Paraíso; East: Caratinga; South: Timóteo.
- Founded: 29 April 1964
- Districts: Barra Alegre and Ipatinga (seat)

Government
  - Mayor: Gustavo Morais Nunes (PL)
  - Term ends: 2028

Area
  - Municipality: 164.884 km^{2} (63.662 sq mi)
  - Urban: 39.78 km^{2} (15.36 sq mi)
- Elevation: 220 m (720 ft)

Population (2022 Brazilian census)
  - Municipality: 227,731
  - Estimate (2025): 235,311
  - Rank: BR: 133rd MG: 11th
  - Density: 1,381.16/km^{2} (3,577.19/sq mi)
- Demonym: Ipatinguense
- Time zone: MGT
- Postal code: 35160-000 to 35169-999
- HDI (UNDP/2010): 0.771
- Climate: Tropical savanna (Aw)
- GDP (IBGE/2021): 17,609,176.97 BRL
- GDP per capita (IBGE/2021): 65869.82 BRL
- Major airport: Vale do Aço Regional Airport
- Passenger rail: Vitória-Minas Railway
- Website: ipatinga.mg.gov.br

Ipatinga is a Brazilian municipality located in the interior of the state of Minas Gerais, in the Southeast Region of Brazil. Situated in the Vale do Rio Doce, it is part of the Vale do Aço Metropolitan Region, approximately 210 km east of the state capital. The municipality covers an area of just over 160 km², with about 40 km² in urban area, and its population was estimated at 235,311 inhabitants in 2025, making it the eleventh most populous municipality in Minas Gerais. The municipal seat is located near the confluence of the Piracicaba River and the Doce River.

Exploration of the region where Ipatinga now stands began in the 19th century with the arrival of bandeirantes. However, significant settlement only occurred between the 1910s and 1920s with the establishment of the EFVM. In 1953, the area was designated a district under Coronel Fabriciano, and during the same decade, it was selected as the site for the industrial hub of Usiminas, leading to rapid population growth as people migrated from various parts of Brazil. At the request of the company, the first neighborhoods of Ipatinga were constructed to house its workers, culminating in the municipality's emancipation in 1964.

Alongside the original "Workers' Village," the growth of the non-industrial population spurred the development of new neighborhoods unrelated to Usiminas during the second half of the 20th century, although industry remains the primary source of municipal revenue. The sustained industrial activity in the region contributed to the formation of the Vale do Aço Metropolitan Region, one of the main urban hubs in the state's interior. Ipatinga plays a pivotal role as an employer for surrounding cities and generates over 60% of the metropolitan region's GDP.

Cultural traditions such as handicrafts and congado from rural communities are present in the municipality, alongside recreational attractions such as Ipanema Park, Shopping Vale do Aço, and Usipa. Much of Ipatinga's entertainment stems from Usiminas' community investments, notably the Usiminas Cultural Center, which hosts cultural events of regional or even national significance.

== Etymology ==
The origin of the name "Ipatinga" varies by source. One version suggests it is a term from the Tupi language meaning "clear water landing." However, according to Eduardo Navarro in his Dictionary of Old Tupi (2013), the name translates to "clear lagoon" (upaba, lagoon, and tinga, clear). Another account claims that the name was created by engineer Pedro Nolasco, responsible for the Vitória-Minas Railway project, combining "Ipa" (from Ipanema) and "tinga" (from Caratinga).

== History ==
=== Colonization of the region ===
Exploration of the region, initially known as the Sertões do Rio Doce, began in the late 16th century with expeditions seeking precious metals. However, exploration was banned in the early 17th century to prevent gold smuggling from the nearby Diamantina region. Settlement was permitted in 1755, and during the 19th century, under Emperor Pedro I of Brazil, the bandeirantes visited the area, noting the presence of indigenous peoples. Nevertheless, significant colonization in the Ipatinga area did not occur until the 20th century. By around 1920, small settlements had formed in the current neighborhoods of Barra Alegre, Ipaneminha, Taúbas, and Bom Jardim, resulting from land appropriations or, in the case of Ipaneminha, as stopping points along a road used by tropeiros traveling to Ouro Preto and Diamantina.

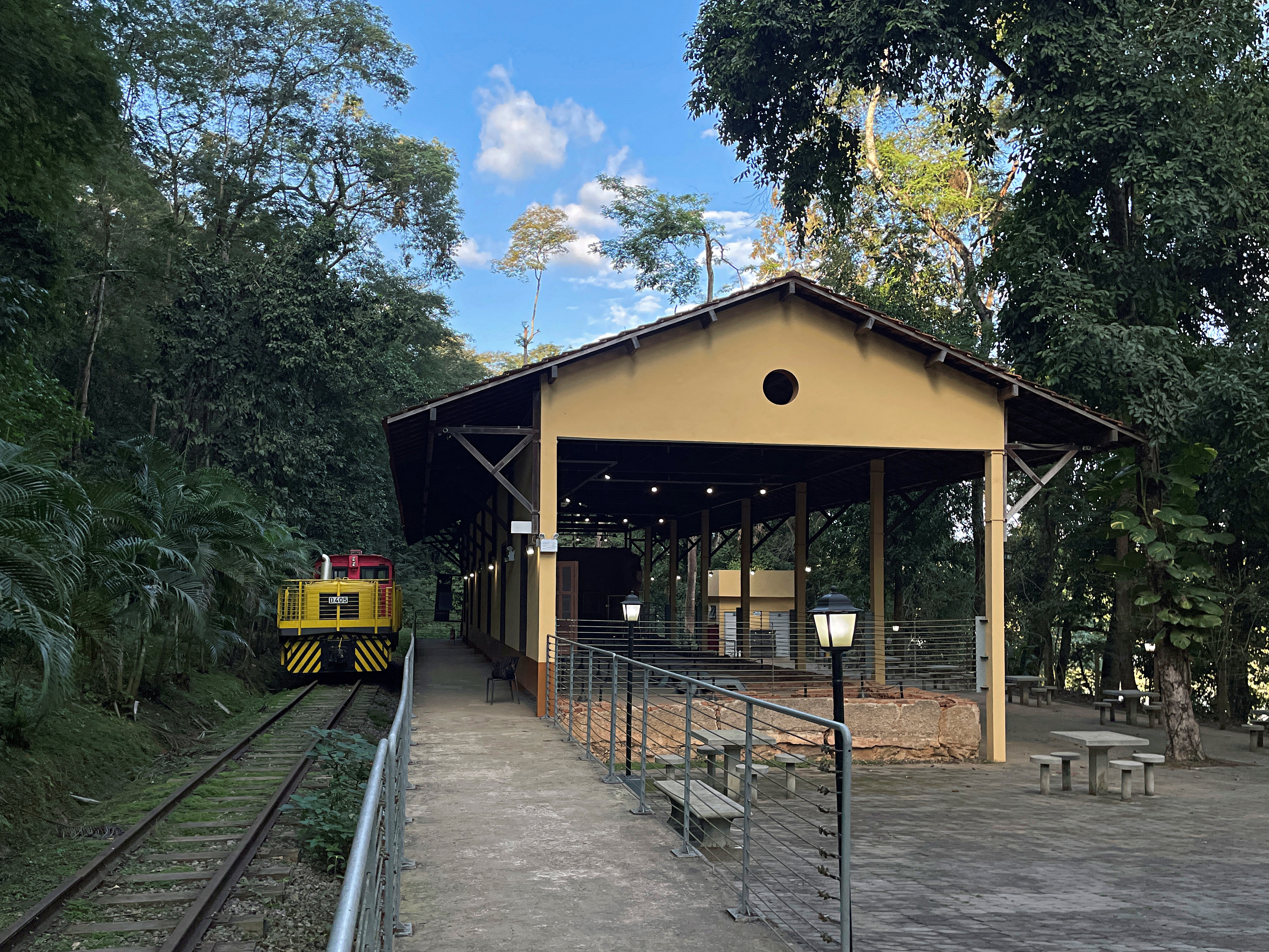
Pedra Mole Station, the first railway station in Ipatinga and the Vale do Aço, after restoration.

The construction of the EFVM through eastern Minas Gerais stimulated population growth along the banks of the Doce and Piracicaba rivers, as it would in the Vale do Aço region. On 1 August 1922, the Pedra Mole Station was inaugurated near the current Cariru neighborhood, and in the same year, the Nossa Senhora Station was built, leading to the emergence of the Córrego de Nossa Senhora or Horto de Nossa Senhora settlement in the present-day Horto neighborhood. At this location, the first pharmacy in the current Vale do Aço Metropolitan Region was established by pharmacist (and future politician) Raimundo Alves de Carvalho.

The Pedra Mole Station was deactivated a few years after its opening due to a change in the EFVM's route, and a new terminal was built in the current Center of Ipatinga. In 1924, the Calado Station was established in Coronel Fabriciano, where the Belgo-Mineira Steel Company set up operations in the 1930s. Large areas were acquired to centralize the company's timber extraction in the region to fuel its furnaces in João Monlevade. However, only Coronel Fabriciano experienced significant population and urban growth between the 1930s and 1940s, intensified by the establishment of Acesita in 1944, leading to its emancipation from Antônio Dias in 1948. Under Law No. 1,039, dated 12 December 1953, the Ipatinga settlement was elevated to a district of Fabriciano.

The presence of charcoal kilns operated by Belgo-Mineira and Acesita boosted local commercial activity, further supported by the construction of the Salto Grande Hydroelectric Plant in Braúnas. Machinery for this project was unloaded in the settlement, stored, and gradually transported to the dam. Nevertheless, the Ipatinga district received little attention from the municipal seat until the late 1950s. Until then, its primary economic activities remained tied to agriculture and livestock.

=== Economic and industrial expansion ===
In 1956, a Japanese commission visited the then-district of Ipatinga, selecting it as the site for the Usiminas steel plant. Factors influencing this decision included suitable topography, proximity to raw material sources and consumer markets, availability of water resources, abundant electricity, local railway infrastructure, and proximity to other steelmaking centers. News of the steel plant's construction attracted many new residents even before its establishment, necessitating urban planning for the city.

With the establishment of Usiminas in Ipatinga, entire neighborhoods were built to house its workers, with Horto being the first. At that time, the settlement had about 60 houses and 300 inhabitants. The development of the first urban plan for what was then called the Workers' Village, designed by architect Raphael Hardy Filho in 1958, enabled the establishment of the municipality's initial neighborhoods. The residential complexes of the former Workers' Village are located between the Piracicaba River and the steel plant and were distributed according to the company's hierarchy, distinguishing between engineers, technicians, workers, and supervisors. Usiminas began operations on 26 October 1962, after then-President João Goulart ignited the blast furnace for the first time, enabling the initial run of pig iron.

However, state investments, which accounted for 55% of Usiminas' state capital—5% from national entrepreneurs and 40% from Japanese investors— were largely confined to the company's surroundings and gave little consideration to Coronel Fabriciano as a whole, which had exempted Usiminas from taxes. Moreover, the infrastructure provided by the company was insufficient to meet the needs of workers from the region or those arriving from other parts of Brazil seeking employment, as well as those not employed in the industry. In Ipatinga, housing was scarce, and violence rates were high.

=== Urban conflicts and emancipation ===
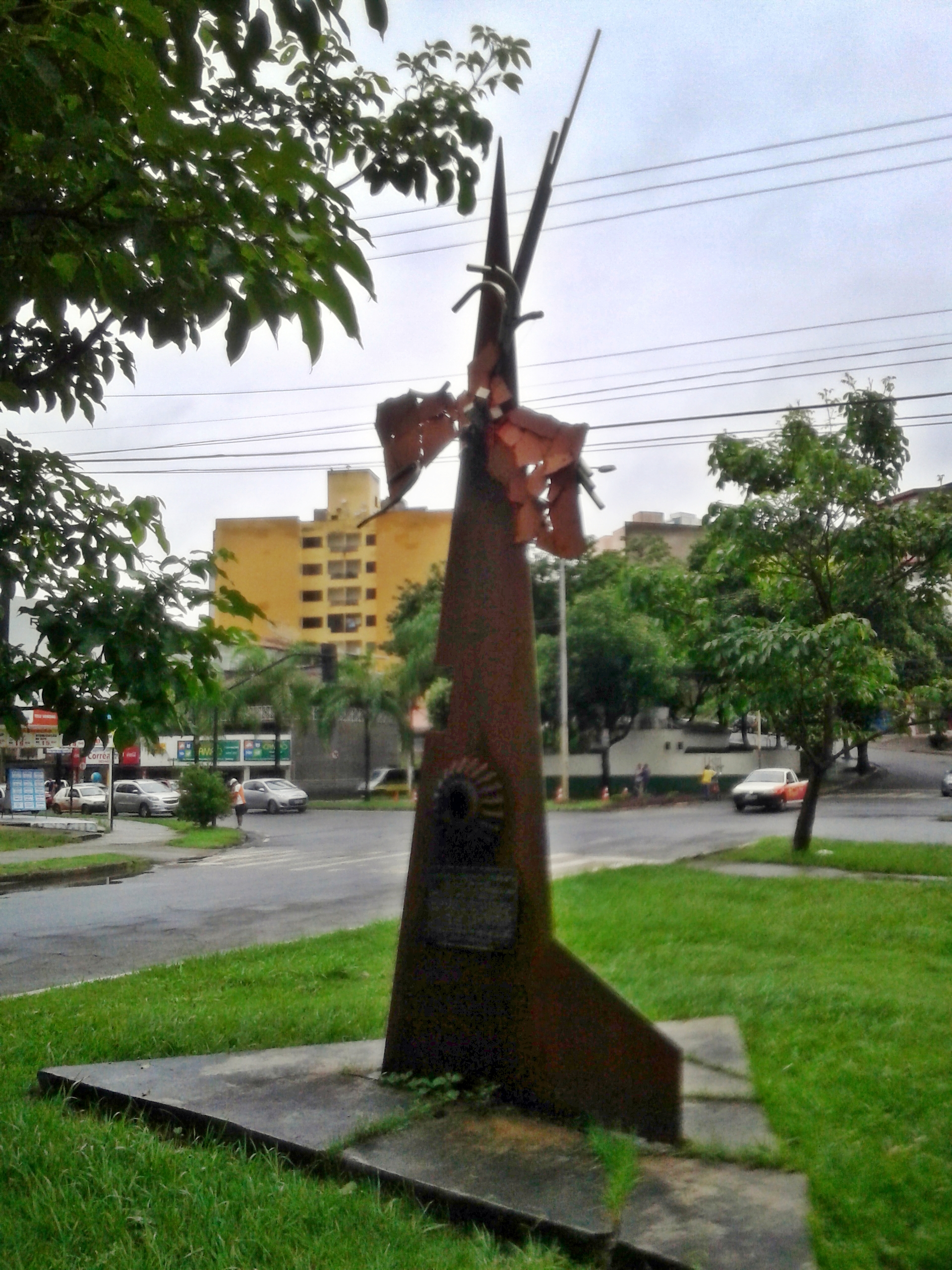
"7 October" Monument in the Bom Retiro neighborhood, commemorating the victims of the Ipatinga Massacre.

Protests by Usiminas workers against poor housing and working conditions, compounded by humiliations such as being searched before entering and leaving the company, intensified military oppression under orders from Minas Gerais Governor José de Magalhães Pinto. On 7 October 1963, approximately six thousand striking workers at the company's entrance were fired upon by 19 soldiers positioned on a truck. The incident, known as the Ipatinga Massacre, officially resulted in eight deaths and 79 injuries, though these figures have been contested.

In the months following the massacre, salary increases were granted, the security team was replaced, and the soldiers involved in the attacks and massacre were convicted. However, the 1964 coup ousted then-President and unionist João Goulart, initiating the military regime. This led to the arrest of local unionists and labor movement leaders, and the involved police officers were acquitted. The construction of residential complexes also intensified during the 1960s.

Prior to the massacre, there was already dissatisfaction among Ipatinga's population with Coronel Fabriciano's administration due to the distance to the municipal seat and a sense of isolation, leading to the formation of a pro-emancipation commission in 1962. Like the district of Timóteo, Ipatinga's emancipation was approved by the Coronel Fabriciano City Council and enacted by the Legislative Assembly of Minas Gerais through state law No. 2,764, dated 30 December 1962, but was vetoed by Governor Magalhães Pinto under the influence of a political alliance with then-Fabriciano mayor Cyro Cotta Poggiali. Fabriciano's administration was reluctant to lose revenue from Acesita (in Timóteo) and Usiminas, and the governor claimed he aimed to maintain the political, administrative, economic, and financial unity of this industrial hub.

In 1962, the district had about 20,000 inhabitants. However, influenced by the 1963 massacre and a rift between Fabriciano's mayor and Magalhães Pinto, a new commission secured Ipatinga's emancipation approval by the State Interior Secretariat on 28 April 1964. The same process also emancipated the district of Timóteo, as well as João Monlevade and Bela Vista de Minas, from Coronel Fabriciano. The independence of Ipatinga and Timóteo was announced on a stage set up in Fabriciano's Centro around noon on the same day, formalized with publication in the Official Gazette the following day, 29 April. José Orozimbo da Silva was appointed as interim mayor, later replaced by Délio Baêta Costa, but Fernando Santos Coura was the first elected mayor, assuming office on 4 December 1965.

=== Urban consolidation ===
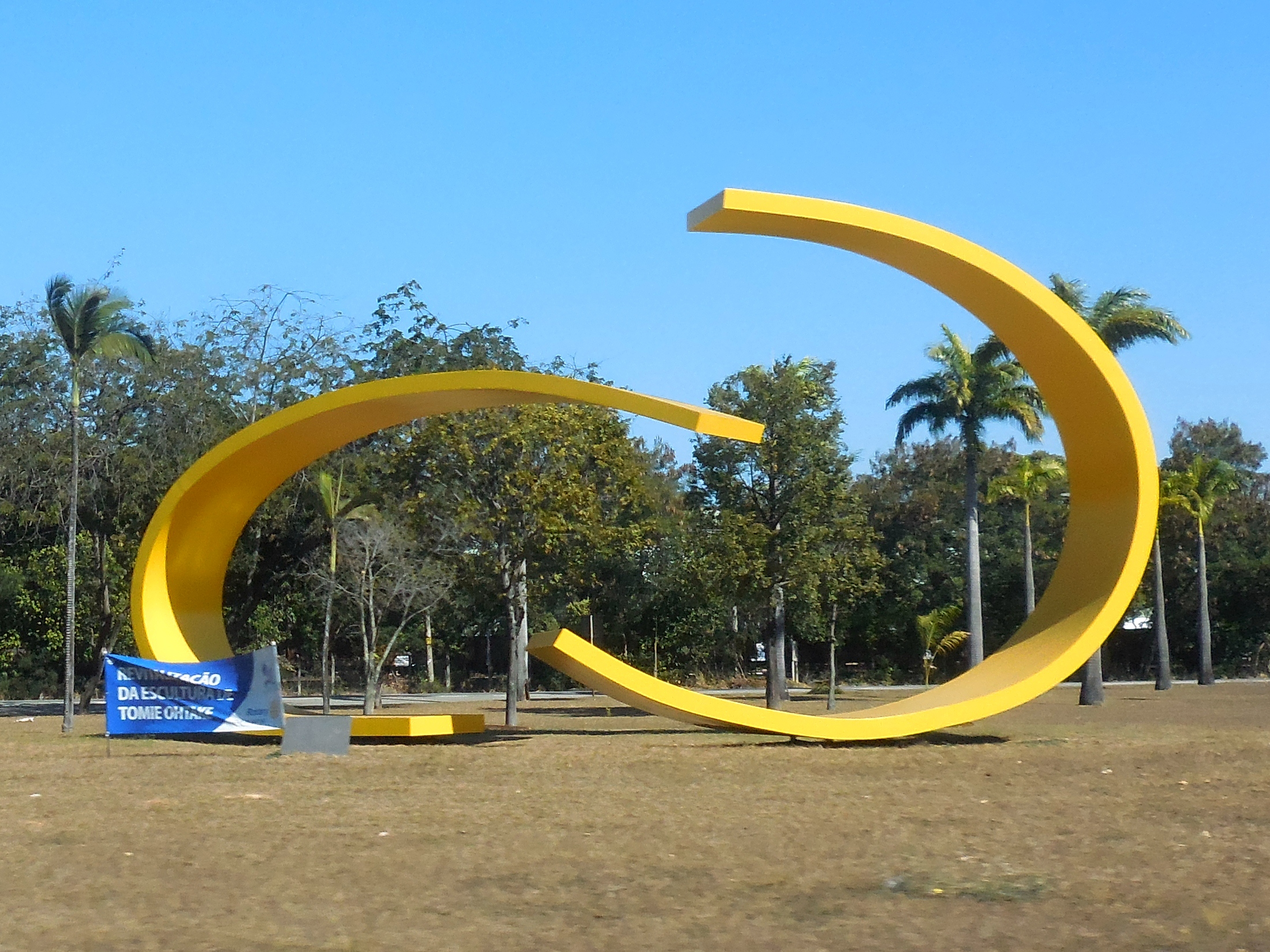
Tomie Ohtake Monument (2004). Commissioned by Usiminas to mark its 41st anniversary, it is located near the site of the Ipatinga Massacre, though its designer does not assign a specific meaning to the work.

By 1967, the Workers' Village included the neighborhoods Amaro Lanari, Bom Retiro, Cariru, Castelo, Horto, Imbaúbas, and Vila Ipanema. Among other essential infrastructure, the São Francisco Xavier School (1962) and the Márcio Cunha Hospital (1967) were established. Influenced by the 1963 massacre, Usiminas adopted human resources and social assistance policies from the 1960s onward, as employment at the steel plant guaranteed access to housing, infrastructure, and healthcare. To regulate the purchase and sale of homes and land and preserve the original city plan, Raphael Hardy Filho developed a housing plan in 1965, stipulating that any construction in the residential complexes required approval from the company's Housing and Urbanism Department. Between the 1970s and 1980s, cemeteries, movie theaters, cultural and theatrical foundations, a bus terminal, and the Ipatingão Stadium were built.

Parallel to the original Workers' Village, the growth of the non-industrial population led to the emergence of new neighborhoods unrelated to the company, particularly in the city's periphery, during the second half of the 20th century. Unplanned growth, combined with natural conditions, contributed to natural disasters during the floods of 1979. In February of that year, floods, bridge collapses, and landslides isolated the city after days of heavy rain across the Doce River basin. In Ipatinga alone, the rains left about 10,000 people homeless and 42 dead, many due to a landslide in the so-called Iapi gully, located between the current Cidade Nobre and Esperança neighborhoods.

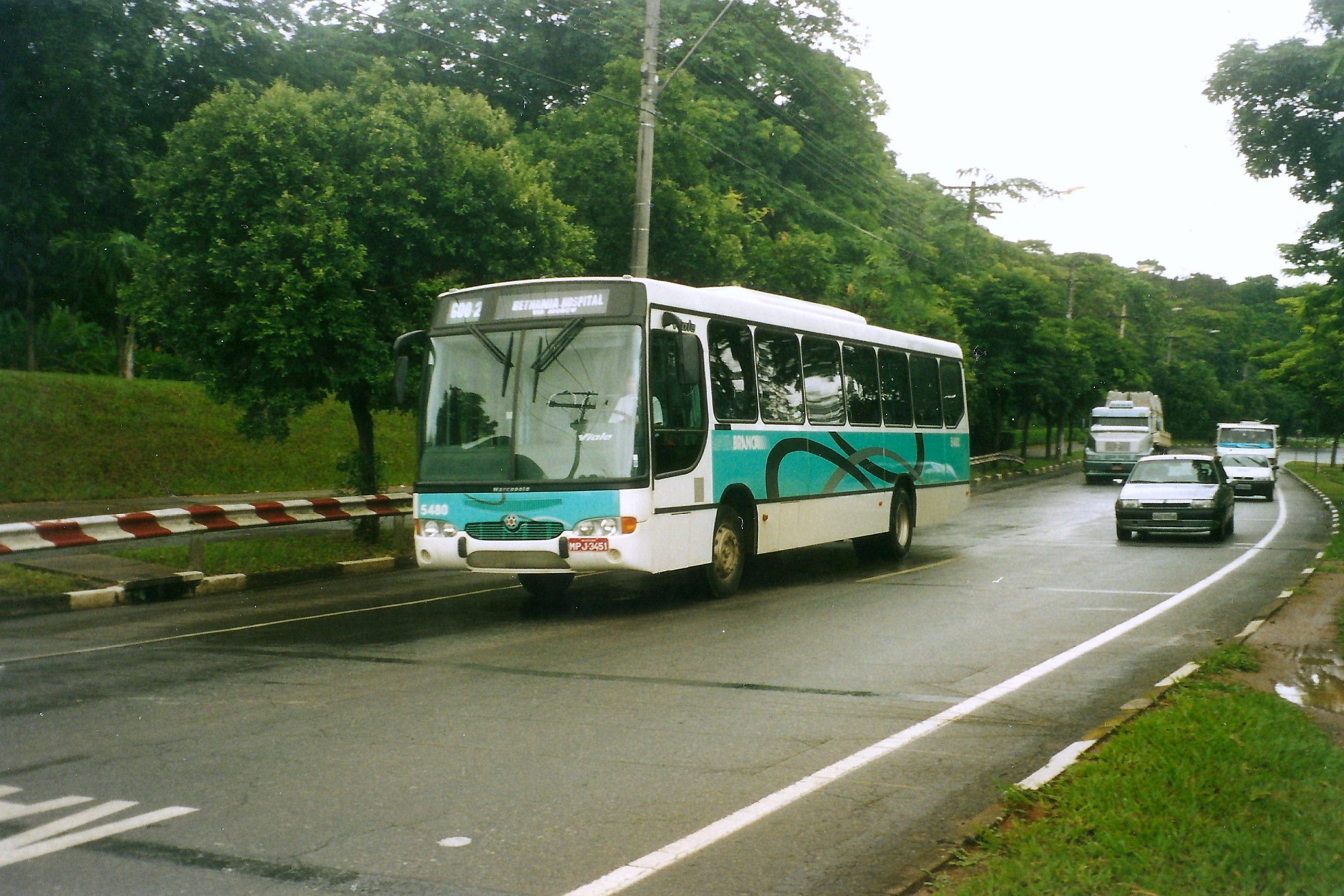
Air-conditioned Viação Águia Branca bus, part of Ipatinga's former public transportation service, photographed on Pedro Linhares Gomes Avenue around 2003.

The Avenida 28 de Abril (formerly Rua do Comércio or Rua do Buraco) in Ipatinga's Center was also flooded during the 1979 rains. This avenue is another example of disorganized development, with a significant presence of slums, contributing to high levels of violence and prostitution, in addition to flooding issues. In the early 1990s, booming commercial activity spurred the restructuring of this area, with part of its population relocated to public housing. Despite housing projects, land regularization, and lot acquisitions, the presence of favelas in Ipatinga remained significant between the 2000s and 2010s, placing the city among those with the highest percentages of residents living in such conditions in Minas Gerais.

The privatization of Usiminas in the early 1990s shifted public administration focus from the company to the city as a whole. The Municipal Master Plan drafted in 1991 emphasized goals to "highlight the city's history and spaces, propose ways to integrate it into daily life, enable the creation of collective references, and foster recognition and appropriation of the city by its population." After its privatization, Usiminas increased investments in arts and cultural facilities to maintain credibility following past events, such as the establishment of the Zélia Olguin Theater in 1994 and the Usiminas Cultural Center in 1998. Employment at Usiminas also guaranteed free dental care for entire families, resulting in Ipatinga recording an index of 0.3 decayed, missing, or filled teeth per inhabitant in 2001, compared to Brazil's average of 4.9 and Finland's 1.2 (the lowest globally, according to the UN). Its employees held 10% of the company's capital with profit-sharing rights. In 2002, investments from the municipality, federal and state governments, and Usiminas made Ipatinga one of the first cities of its size in Latin America to treat 100% of its wastewater.

=== Recent history ===
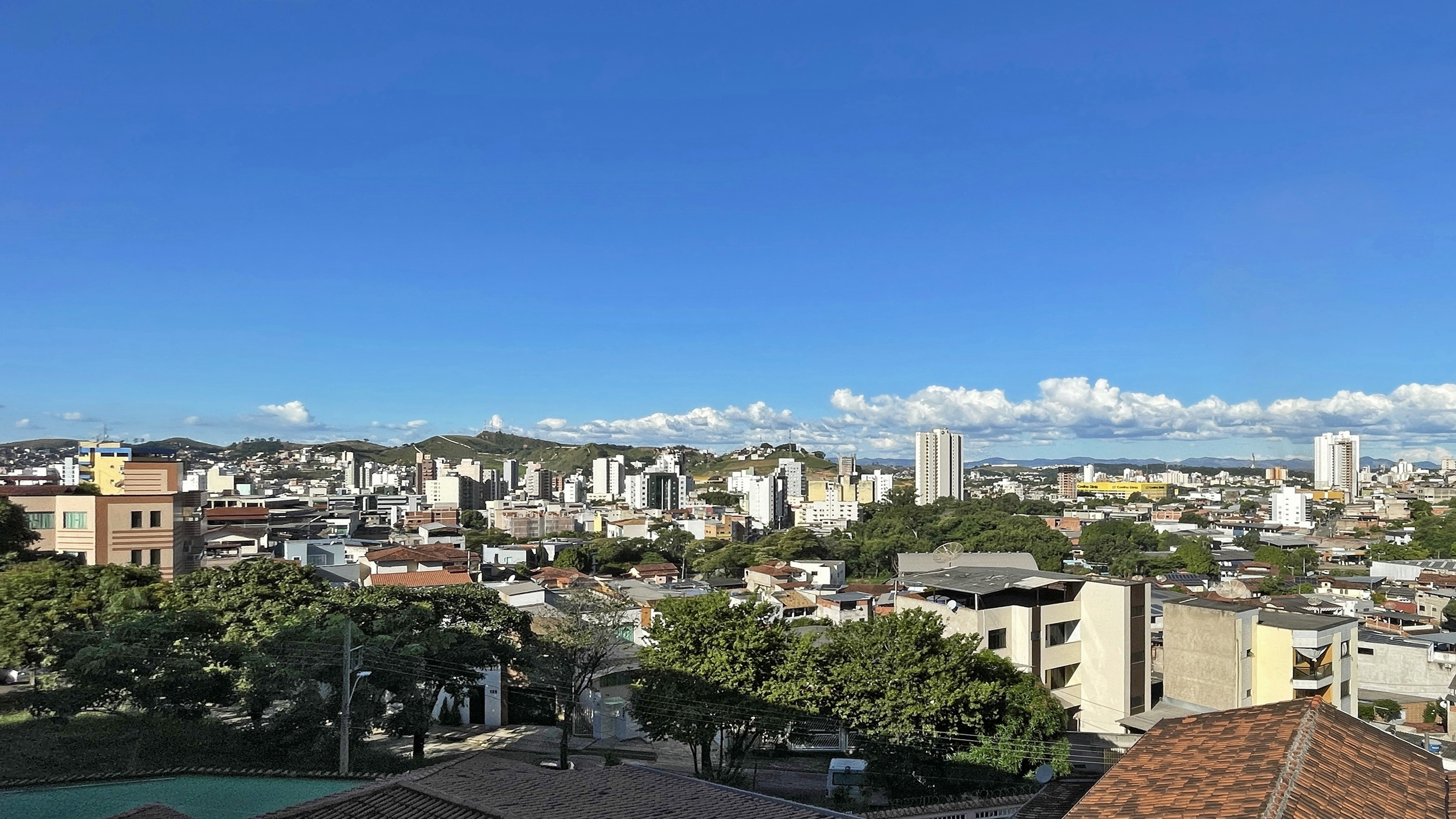
Partial view of the Cidade Nobre and Iguaçu neighborhoods from Ideal, showcasing a significant number of buildings, some under construction (2025).

At the start of the 21st century, Ipatinga and the Vale do Aço were recognized for their industrial focus, with growing commerce and service sectors, establishing the region as a hub for several municipalities in eastern Minas Gerais. Economic studies frequently cited Ipatinga, such as a SEBRAE survey identifying it as one of the best cities in Minas Gerais to start a business in 2012, and among the top 100 Brazilian municipalities for real estate investment in 2015. In 2016, it ranked 48th among Brazil's smartest cities, according to Bloomberg Philanthropies' ranking, which evaluates public administration innovations addressing social issues.

However, the 2008 financial crisis and the Great Recession significantly reduced steel demand and production across Brazil, including in the Vale do Aço. This led to a notable decline in the local industrial workforce due to job cuts and reduced investments, directly impacting the service and commerce sectors. In the municipality alone, 7,879 industrial jobs were eliminated between 2011 and 2013. A total of 10,871 layoffs across all sectors were recorded between January and March 2015, with the majority (3,782) in construction, and 25% of the municipal government's commissioned positions were suspended by December 2015. By the early 2020s, the tertiary sector had regained strength, but the industry, while stabilized, contributed fewer new jobs.

== Geography ==
The municipality's area is 164.884 km², representing 0.0282% of Minas Gerais' territory, 0.0179% of the Southeast Region, and 0.0019% of Brazil's total territory. Of this total, 39.78 km² are urban. According to the regional division effective since 2017, established by the IBGE, the municipality belongs to the Intermediate and Immediate Geographic Regions of Ipatinga. Previously, under the division into microregions and mesoregions, it was part of the Ipatinga microregion, included in the Vale do Rio Doce mesoregion.

=== Topography and hydrography ===
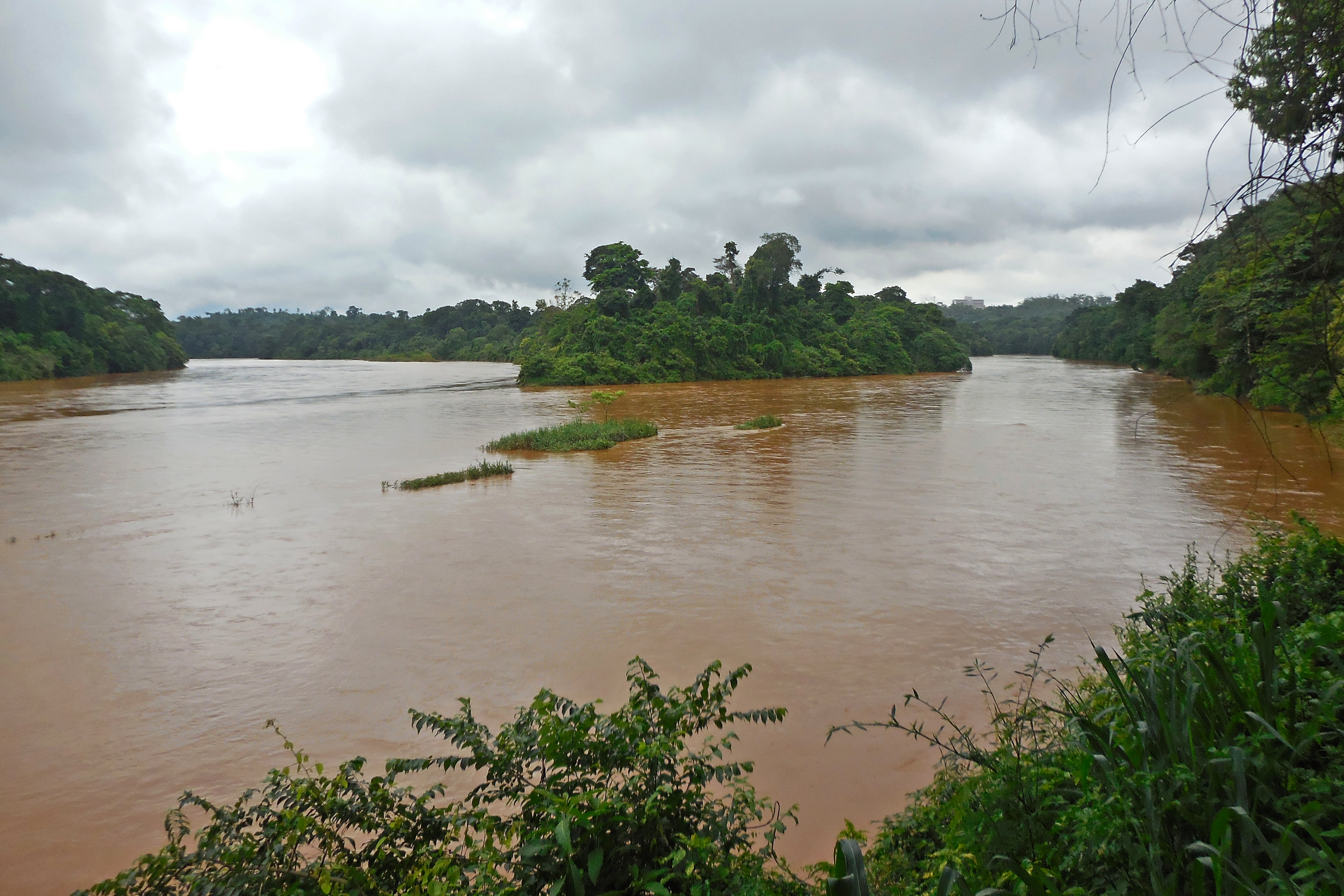
Confluence of the Piracicaba River (right) and Doce River viewed from the Pedra Mole Station lookout.

Ipatinga is situated in the interplateau depression of the Vale do Rio Doce, with its topography shaped by fluvial erosion acting on granite-gneiss rocks from the Precambrian period. The geological complex includes gneissic, magmatic, and metamorphic rocks, such as biotite-gneiss, granitic rocks, and granite-gneiss. The terrain is diverse, with 55% of Ipatinga's territory being flat, 30% undulating, and the remaining 15% rugged.

The highest elevations are found in the northwest, in the Serra dos Cocais range, reaching up to 1,163 meters. Conversely, the lowest altitudes are along the riverbanks, with the minimum elevation of 235 meters at the mouth of the Piracicaba River in the Doce River. The Piracicaba River's location and the flat terrain nearby facilitated the establishment of the Vitória-Minas Railway and Usiminas, and later the urban perimeter of Ipatinga, which was forced to expand toward higher elevations. Consequently, significant occupation, particularly by lower-income communities, has occurred in areas with steep slopes.

The municipality lies within the Doce River Basin and is part of the Piracicaba River sub-basin. The mouth of the Piracicaba River in the Doce River is near the Cariru neighborhood, on the border with Timóteo. Underground, beneath the Piracicaba River's mouth, lies an alluvial aquifer, the source of water for most of the Vale do Aço's supply. The main sub-basin within the municipal territory is that of the Ipanema Stream, covering about 150 km², with its main course traversing the city before reaching its mouth in the Doce River after a 28.5 km journey. Other urban watercourses include the Bom Jardim, Forquilha, Madalena, Novo, Pedra Branca, Taúbas, and Vaga-lume streams. The rural municipal area, however, hosts numerous small watercourses and over 320 springs.

=== Neighboring municipalities and metropolitan region ===
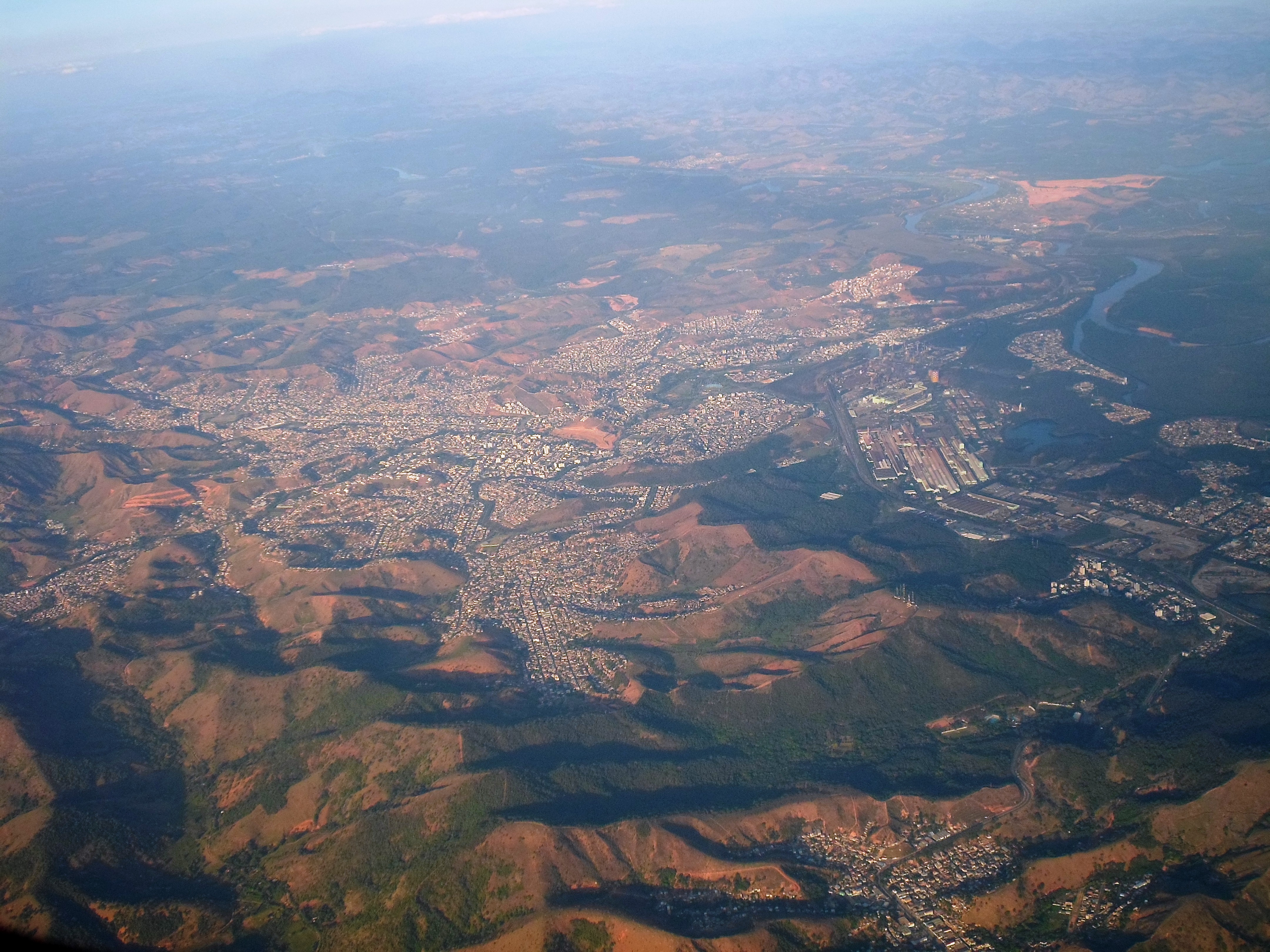
Aerial view of Ipatinga

Ipatinga borders Mesquita and Santana do Paraíso to the north, Caratinga to the east, Timóteo to the south, and Coronel Fabriciano to the west. The region's rapid growth has blurred political boundaries between municipalities, forming the Vale do Aço Metropolitan Region (RMVA), which includes Ipatinga, Coronel Fabriciano, Santana do Paraíso, and Timóteo, along with 24 other municipalities in the metropolitan belt. As the seat of Usiminas and other metal-mechanical companies, Ipatinga is a key employer for surrounding cities and, in 2011, generated 68.9% of the metropolitan region's GDP. The region gained international recognition due to major companies such as Cenibra (in Belo Oriente), Aperam South America (in Timóteo), and Usiminas (in Ipatinga), all with significant export volumes. Despite its recent settlement, the region is one of the state's main urban hubs.

=== Climate ===
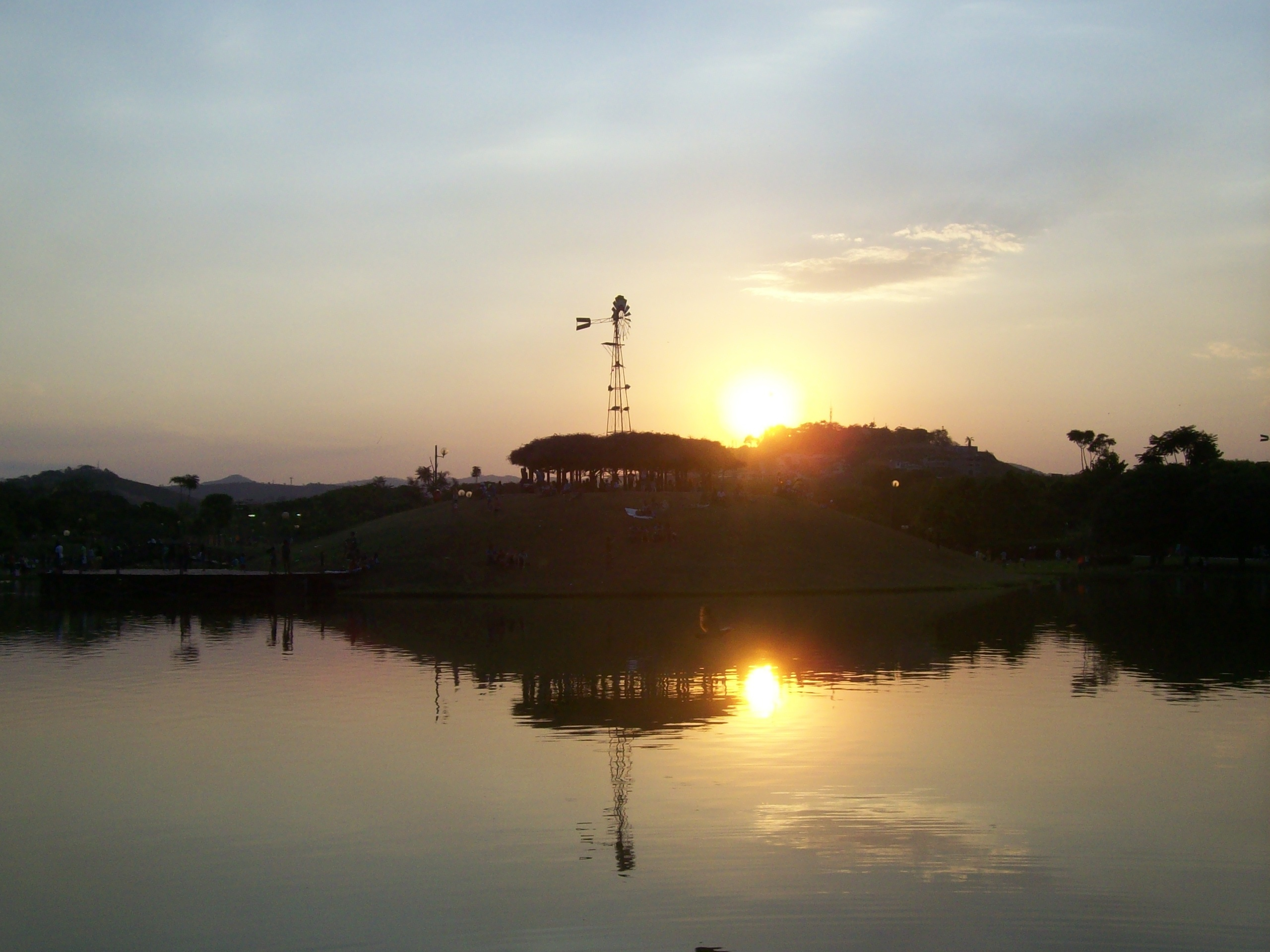
A sunset viewed from Ipanema Park on a September afternoon

Ipatinga's climate is classified as tropical wet and dry type Aw according to the Köppen system, with an average annual temperature of 23 °C and average annual rainfall of 1,360 mm, concentrated between October and April. The rainy season encompasses the warmer months, while the dry season covers the milder months. Autumn and spring are transitional seasons. The transition between dry and wet periods is marked by thunderstorms and high thermal amplitude, particularly from late winter to spring.

Precipitation primarily occurs as rain, with occasional hail, recorded on 4 September 2006, 17 December 2012, and 21 January 2025. Rains may be accompanied by lightning and strong wind gusts. On the night of 25 December 2023, a storm brought wind gusts of up to 120 km/h, causing roof damage, fallen trees, and power outages across the city. According to the Atmospheric Electricity Group of the INPE in 2018, the municipality has a lightning density of 2.947 strikes per km²/year, ranking 278th in Minas Gerais and 3,218th nationally.

Largest 24-hour precipitation accumulations recorded in Ipatinga (INMET) by month
Month	Accumulation	Date	Month	Accumulation	Date
January	131 mm	5 January 1982	July	16.2 mm	24 July 1986
February	90 mm	12 February 2004	August	45.6 mm	26 August 1986
March	180 mm	20 March 1979	September	46.1 mm	28 September 1992
April	103.8 mm	4 April 1987	October	84.9 mm	8 October 1992
May	54.8 mm	22 May 1995	November	241.7 mm	14 November 1981
June	22.5 mm	23 June 2004	December	204.2 mm	16 December 1988
Period: 1961–1962, 1979–1983, 1985–1988, 1990, and 1992–2004

With over 1,800 hours of sunshine annually, Ipatinga's average yearly relative humidity is 84%. However, low humidity levels can occur during the dry season or prolonged Indian summers (dry spells). During these periods, dry air combined with air pollution increases the concentration of atmospheric pollutants, contributing to poorer air quality. Fog forms when high humidity combines with low temperatures. The prevailing wind comes from the east, with the windiest period occurring between 3 August and 6 December, when the average wind speed is 10.6 kilometers per hour, peaking slightly in September and October. During the calmer season from March to June, average wind speeds range between 8 and 9 kilometers per hour.

According to data from the National Institute of Meteorology (INMET), collected during the periods of 1961–1962, 1979–1983, 1985–1988, 1990, and 1992–2005 at the former Usiminas weather station, the lowest recorded temperature in Ipatinga was 7.6 °C on 1 June 1979, and the highest reached 38.9 °C on 29 November 1993. The lowest relative humidity recorded was 21% on 21 November 1982. The highest 24-hour precipitation total was 241.7 millimeters (mm) on 14 November 1981. Other significant precipitation events (completing the top five) include 204.2 mm on 16 December 1988, 181.3 mm on 20 November 1998, 180 mm on 20 March 1979, and 171.1 mm on 10 December 1980. Subsequent measurements by Usiminas recorded a record high of 42.6 °C on 31 October 2012, and an absolute minimum humidity of 16% on 10 September 2012. On the night of 12 January 2025, Ipatinga was struck by a storm that dumped over 200 mm of rain in six hours, causing floods and landslides across various parts of the city, resulting in at least ten deaths.

Climate data for Ipatinga (Usiminas) (1981–2010)
Month	Jan	Feb	Mar	Apr	May	Jun	Jul	Aug	Sep	Oct	Nov	Dec	Year
Record high °C (°F)	37.4 (99.3)	38.4 (101.1)	36.2 (97.2)	35.2 (95.4)	34.4 (93.9)	31.8 (89.2)	33.6 (92.5)	34.2 (93.6)	37.8 (100.0)	37.8 (100.0)	38.9 (102.0)	38.8 (101.8)	38.9 (102.0)
Mean daily maximum °C (°F)	30.3 (86.5)	31.4 (88.5)	30.7 (87.3)	29.4 (84.9)	27.5 (81.5)	26.3 (79.3)	26.4 (79.5)	27.1 (80.8)	28.5 (83.3)	29.4 (84.9)	29.3 (84.7)	29.6 (85.3)	28.8 (83.8)
Mean daily minimum °C (°F)	21.7 (71.1)	21.8 (71.2)	21.5 (70.7)	20.1 (68.2)	17.6 (63.7)	15.5 (59.9)	15.1 (59.2)	16.0 (60.8)	18.4 (65.1)	20.1 (68.2)	20.9 (69.6)	21.2 (70.2)	19.2 (66.6)
Record low °C (°F)	16.0 (60.8)	17.4 (63.3)	17.3 (63.1)	14.0 (57.2)	9.8 (49.6)	7.6 (45.7)	8.4 (47.1)	9.2 (48.6)	10.6 (51.1)	11.2 (52.2)	14.0 (57.2)	15.6 (60.1)	7.6 (45.7)
Average precipitation mm (inches)	260.5 (10.26)	127.5 (5.02)	159.2 (6.27)	77.2 (3.04)	37.3 (1.47)	9.9 (0.39)	8.2 (0.32)	16.5 (0.65)	31.5 (1.24)	99.5 (3.92)	221.2 (8.71)	311.0 (12.24)	1,359.5 (53.52)
Average precipitation days	13	8	9	6	4	2	1	2	4	7	12	16	84
Average relative humidity (%)	84.0	80.4	83.7	85.2	85.9	84.6	81.4	78.4	76.6	76.4	81.4	84.6	81.9
Mean monthly sunshine hours	152.7	173.9	173.7	172.7	160.9	158.6	169.2	162.6	135.0	133.6	135.5	127.4	1,855.8
Source: National Institute of Meteorology (INMET) temperature records: 1961–1962, 1979–1983, 1985–1988, 1990, 1992–2005

=== Ecology and environment ===
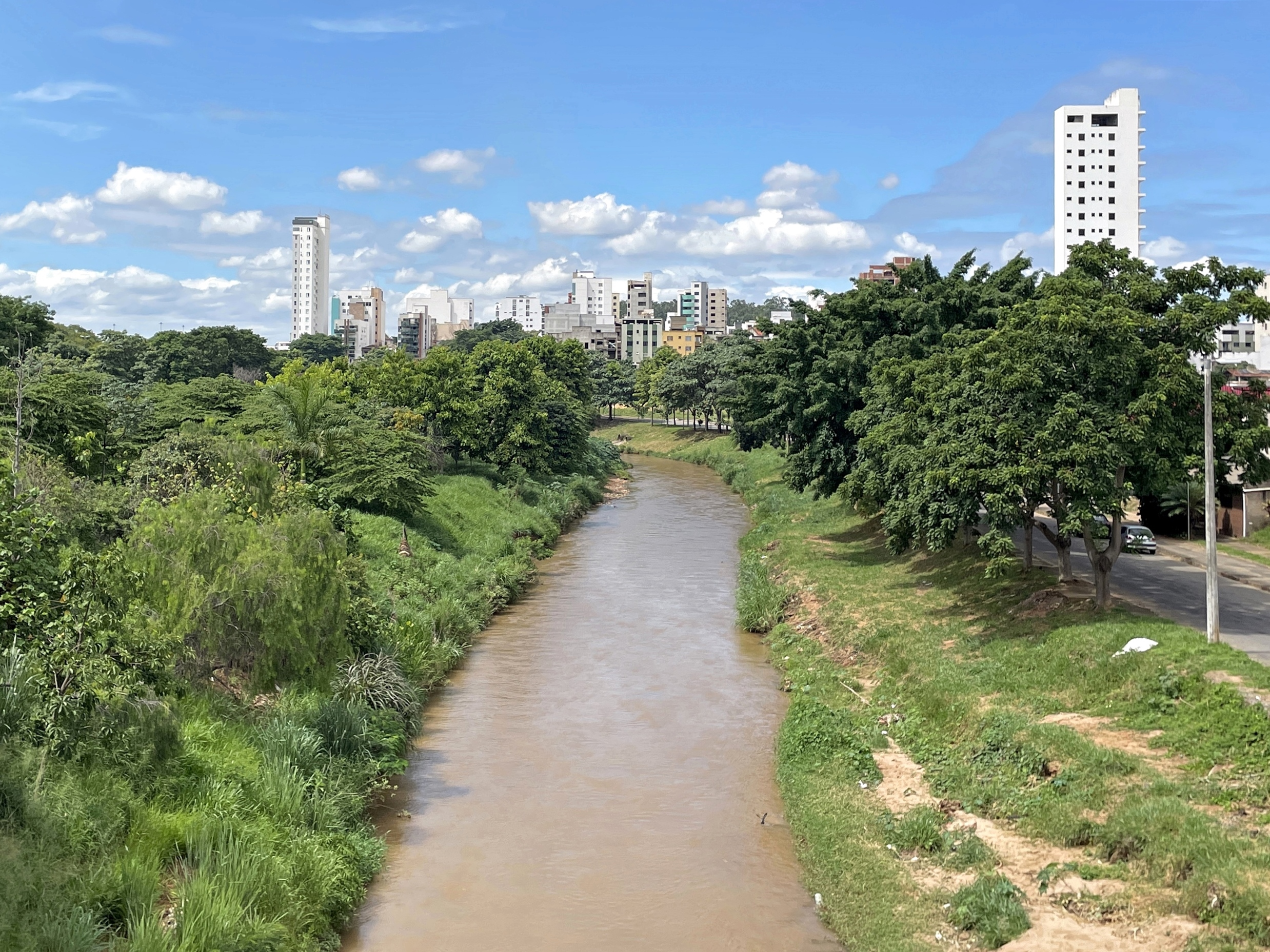
Ipanema Creek in the Iguaçu neighborhood

The native vegetation of Ipatinga belongs to the Atlantic Forest biome, with only a few fragmented areas remaining amidst reforestation zones, pastures, and urban areas. Monoculture reforestation with eucalyptus is significant, covering a larger area than the original biome, primarily to supply raw material for the Cenibra cellulose factory in Belo Oriente. In 2009, eucalyptus plantations covered 3,055.74 hectares (18.36% of Ipatinga's territory), while watercourses accounted for 51.55 hectares (0.31%) and urbanized areas spanned 3,299.01 hectares (19.82%). By 2014, eucalyptus plantations occupied 32.75 km² (19.5% of the municipality's area), while native Atlantic Forest covered 6 km² (3.65% of the total area).

Ipatinga is home to one environmental protection area (APA) and two Private Natural Heritage Reserves (RPPNs), which, together with neighboring preservation areas such as the Serra dos Cocais in Coronel Fabriciano and the Santana do Paraíso APA, form a wildlife corridor connecting to the Rio Doce State Park (PERD), the largest remaining Atlantic Forest fragment in Minas Gerais and one of the state's most significant lake systems. However, some local preservation areas are used for pastures or eucalyptus cultivation. The Ipanema APA, established in 1997, contains Atlantic Forest remnants that serve as a riparian forest for the headwaters of the Ipanema Creek and other smaller watercourses. The Fazenda Córrego da Bucaina and Sítio do Zaca RPPNs are privately owned but registered at the state level as conservation areas.

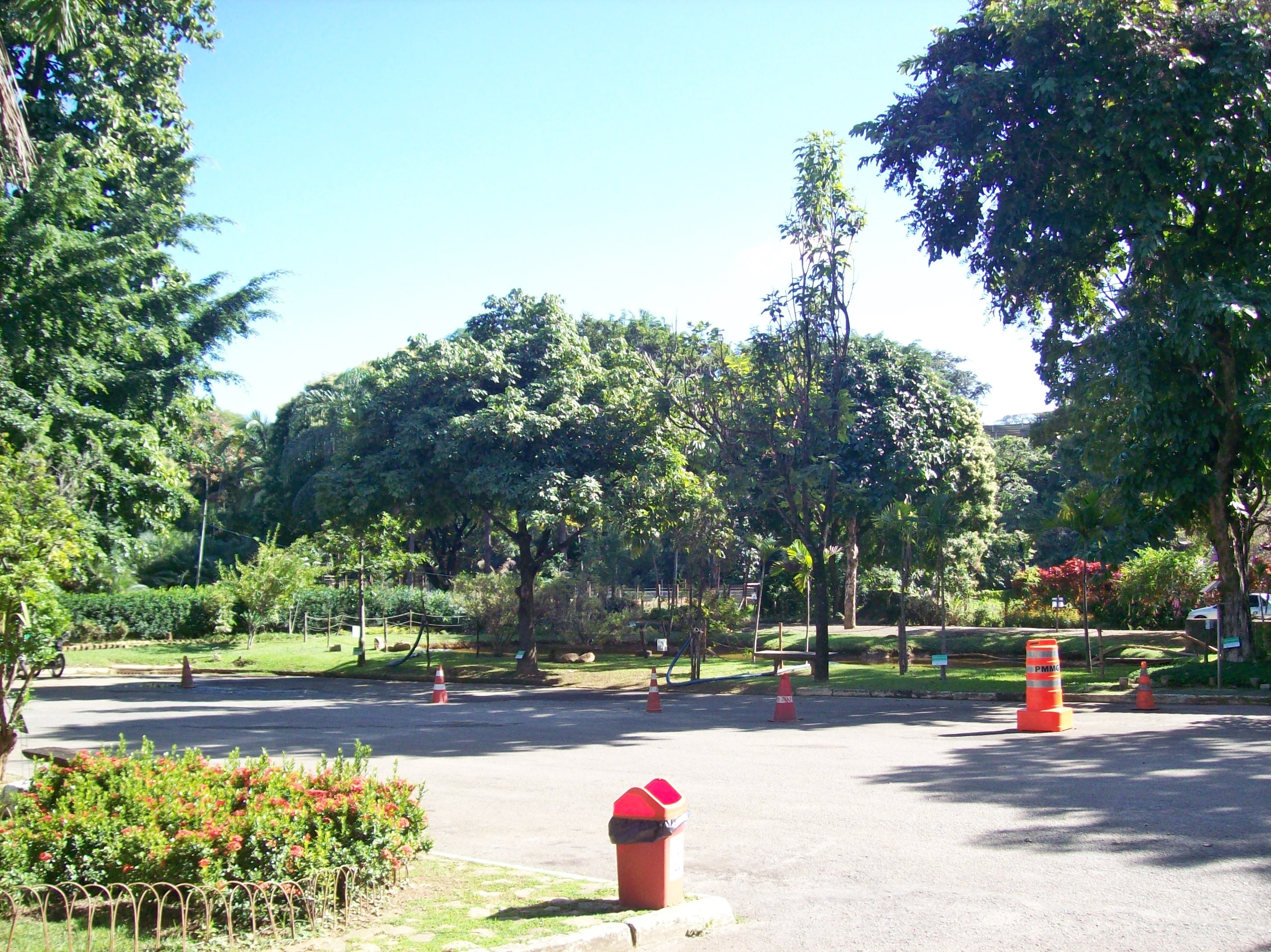
Interior of the Ipatinga Municipal Nursery

The municipality manages five municipal parks: Ipanema, Samambaias, Parque das Montanhas, Parque Ecológico das Águas, and Parque Campo da União. The Ipanema Park, with approximately 1 million m², is the largest urban green area in Minas Gerais. The Samambaia Municipal Park, located in the Bom Jardim neighborhood and established in 2000, features a lake and an Atlantic Forest remnant. Also created in 2000, the Campo da União Park lies between the Planalto II and Parque das Águas (Veneza) neighborhoods. The remaining parks were designated by the 2014 Municipal Master Plan. A municipal nursery is also maintained by the city, where fruit, ornamental, arboreal, and medicinal seedlings are cultivated for public spaces or purchased by residents. The Usipa Biodiversity Center (CEBUS), managed under Usiminas' oversight, includes a small zoo, a seedling nursery, and a conservation area, offering visits, ecological activities, and programs for schools and the community.

Ipatinga is considered one of Brazil's most tree-covered cities, with over 100 m² of green space per inhabitant. In 2014, the city reported approximately 100,000 trees planted in public areas, including native species such as mahogany, pine, palms, yellow mombins, mangoes, guavas, and golden trumpet trees. That year, there were 450,000 m² of grassy areas in squares and parks, 40,000 m² of gardens, and about 100 public squares and green spaces, adorned with roughly 20 native species, including purple heart, spider plant, spurflower, heath, ixora, rose moss, periwinkle, and daisy. Local fauna includes birds such as the rufous-bellied thrush, thraupis, Andean sparrow, columbina, tanager, and great kiskadee, while wildlife such as oncillas, armadillos, pacas, foxes, and wild rats inhabit the remaining forest areas.

==== Environmental Issues ====
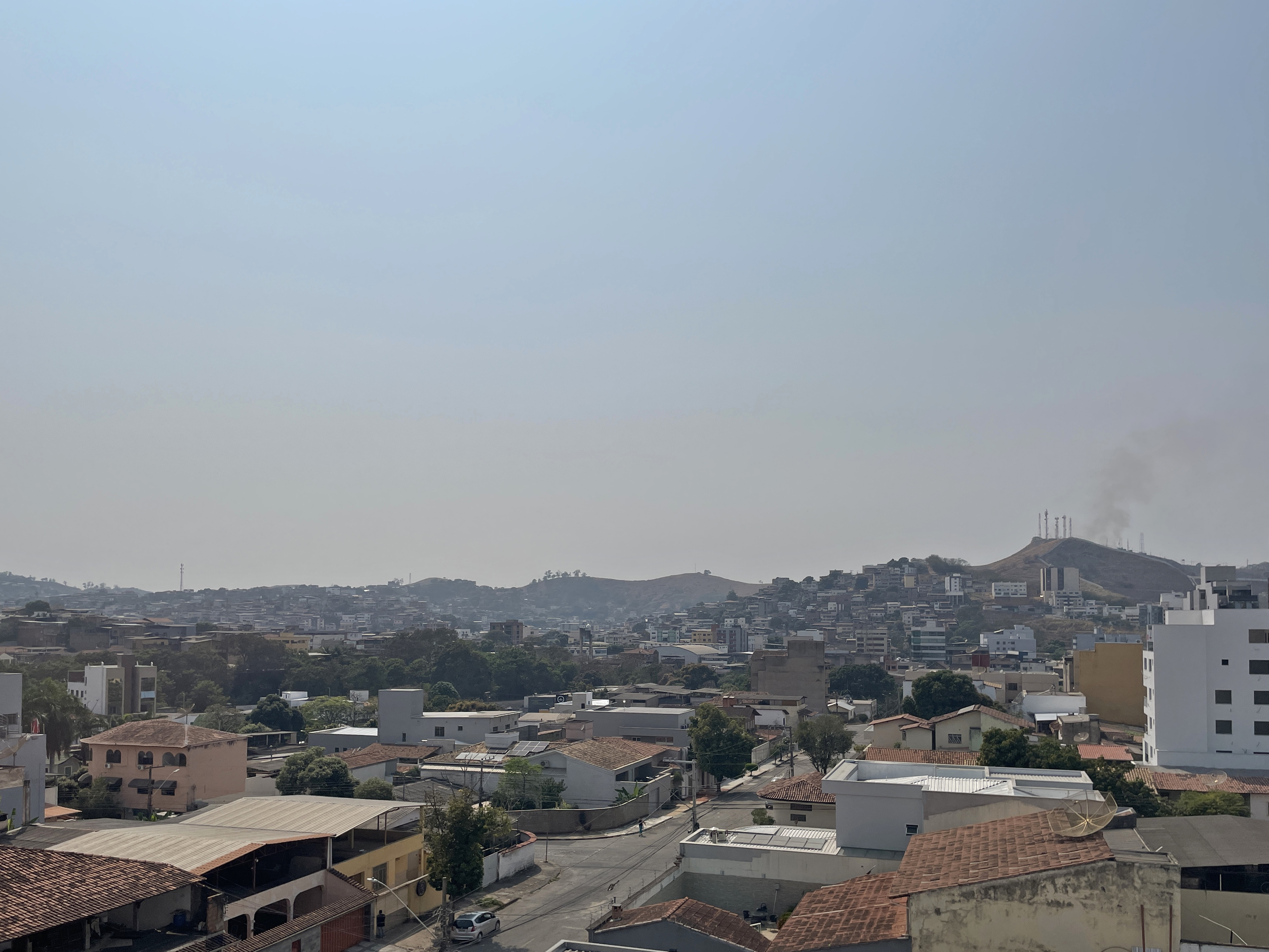
Smoky, polluted sky after a prolonged dry period in 2024, viewed from Cidade Nobre

Key environmental challenges in Ipatinga include flooding, which causes significant damage in low-lying, densely populated areas during the rainy season, and landslides on hills and slopes. Drainage issues in some areas hinder proper rainwater runoff to watercourses. However, landslide-prone areas are relatively small compared to the urban expanse, as the city's terrain is less rugged, and large portions of the municipal territory are managed by Usiminas. A Municipal Risk Plan identifies areas susceptible to damage.

Forest fires destroy native vegetation, degrade soil quality, and worsen air quality, compounded by air pollution from the Vale do Aço's industrial plants. Air quality monitoring panels installed in some neighborhoods provide pollution level updates. Water pollution is mitigated by wastewater treatment plants operated by Copasa and Usiminas, serving over 99% of the population. However, visual pollution is prevalent in urban areas. Posters on payphones, poles, and signs exacerbate the problem, as does graffiti on the walls and gates of homes and businesses.

== Demographics ==
Historical population
Year	Pop.	±%
1970	47,882	—
1980	150,318	+213.9%
1991	180,069	+19.8%
2000	212,496	+18.0%
2010	239,468	+12.7%
2022	227,731	−4.9%
Source: Brazilian Institute of Geography and Statistics (IBGE)

In 2022, Ipatinga's population was estimated at 227,731 inhabitants by the census conducted by the Brazilian Institute of Geography and Statistics (IBGE), reflecting a decline from 2010, when 239,468 residents were recorded. According to the 2022 census, 108,459 inhabitants were male (47.63%), and 119,272 were female (52.37%). Additionally, 227,128 inhabitants lived in the urban area (99.74%), with 603 in the rural area (0.26%). The district seat housed 140,197 inhabitants (61.56% of the municipal population), while the Barra Alegre district had 87,534 residents (38.44%).

Of the total population in 2022, 40,540 inhabitants (17.8%) were under 15 years old, 31,620 (13.88%) were aged 15–24, 49,856 (21.9%) were 25–39, 76,946 (33.78%) were 40–64, and 28,769 (12.64%) were 65 or older. In 2010, the life expectancy at birth was 76.9 years, and the total fertility rate per woman was 1.6.

According to the IBGE in 2020, Ipatinga is classified as a regional capital in Brazil's urban hierarchy, exerting significant economic and service influence over a population cluster encompassing nine other municipalities: Belo Oriente, Bugre, Coronel Fabriciano, Ipaba, Jaguaraçu, Marliéria, Naque, Santana do Paraíso, and Timóteo. This cluster, in turn, interacts with larger cities such as Belo Horizonte.

=== Indicators and inequality ===
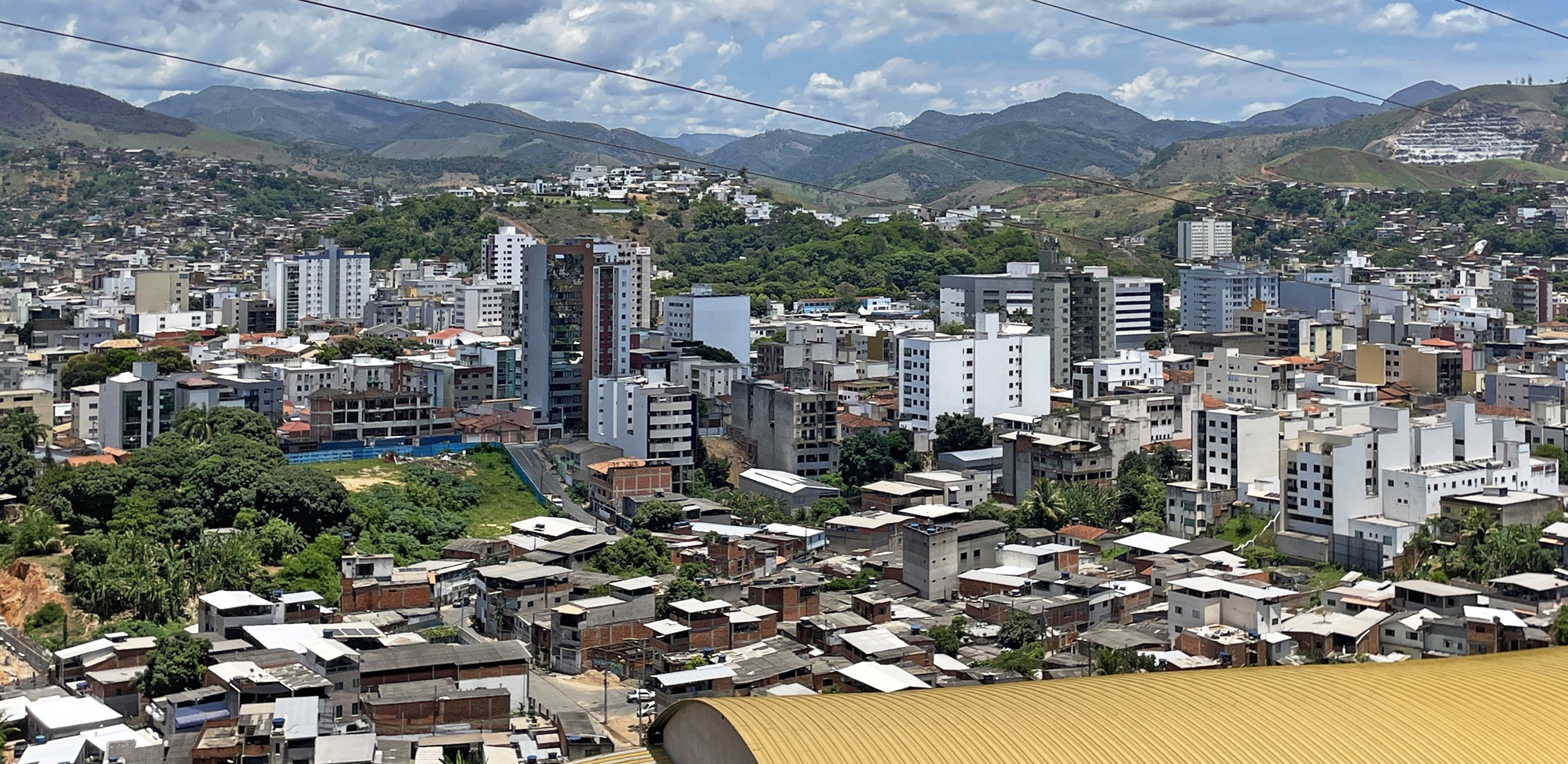
Vila da Paz, one of Ipatinga's slums, contrasting with buildings in the Iguaçu and Cidade Nobre neighborhoods in the background

Ipatinga's Human Development Index (HDI-M) is considered high by the United Nations Development Programme (PNUD), with a value of 0.771, ranking 220th in Brazil and 16th in Minas Gerais. Most of the city's indicators are close to the national average, according to the PNUD. The education index is 0.705, longevity is 0.864, and income is 0.752.

From 2000 to 2010, the proportion of people with a per capita household income of up to half a minimum wage decreased by 61.6%. In 2010, 93.5% of the population lived above the poverty line, 4.7% were at the poverty line, and 1.7% were below it. The Gini coefficient, which measures economic inequality, was 0.524, where 1.00 is the worst and 0.00 is the best. The wealthiest 20% of the population accounted for 57.0% of the city's total income, 14.1 times higher than the 4.0% share of the poorest 20%. In 2010, according to the Gorceix Foundation, there was a housing deficit of 10,495 units, while 6,331 properties were vacant.

In 2022, according to the IBGE census, 11.73% of the population lived in slums and urban communities, the tenth-highest proportion among Minas Gerais municipalities. The institute identified 19 slums and urban communities in Ipatinga, housing 26,718 people. Despite planned housing developments for industrial workers during Usiminas' establishment, slums emerged due to uncontrolled land occupation by migrants drawn to local economic growth. Housing projects, land regularization, and lot acquisition are initiatives that aim to improve the management of policies related to these issues.

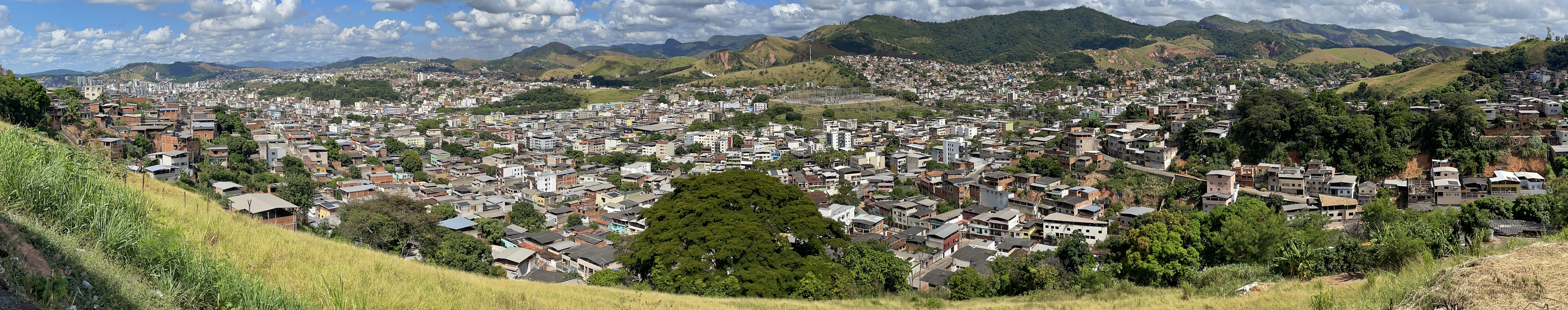
Panoramic view of the Betânia neighborhood with Canaã on the left, the most populous region of the city.

=== Ethnicity and religion ===
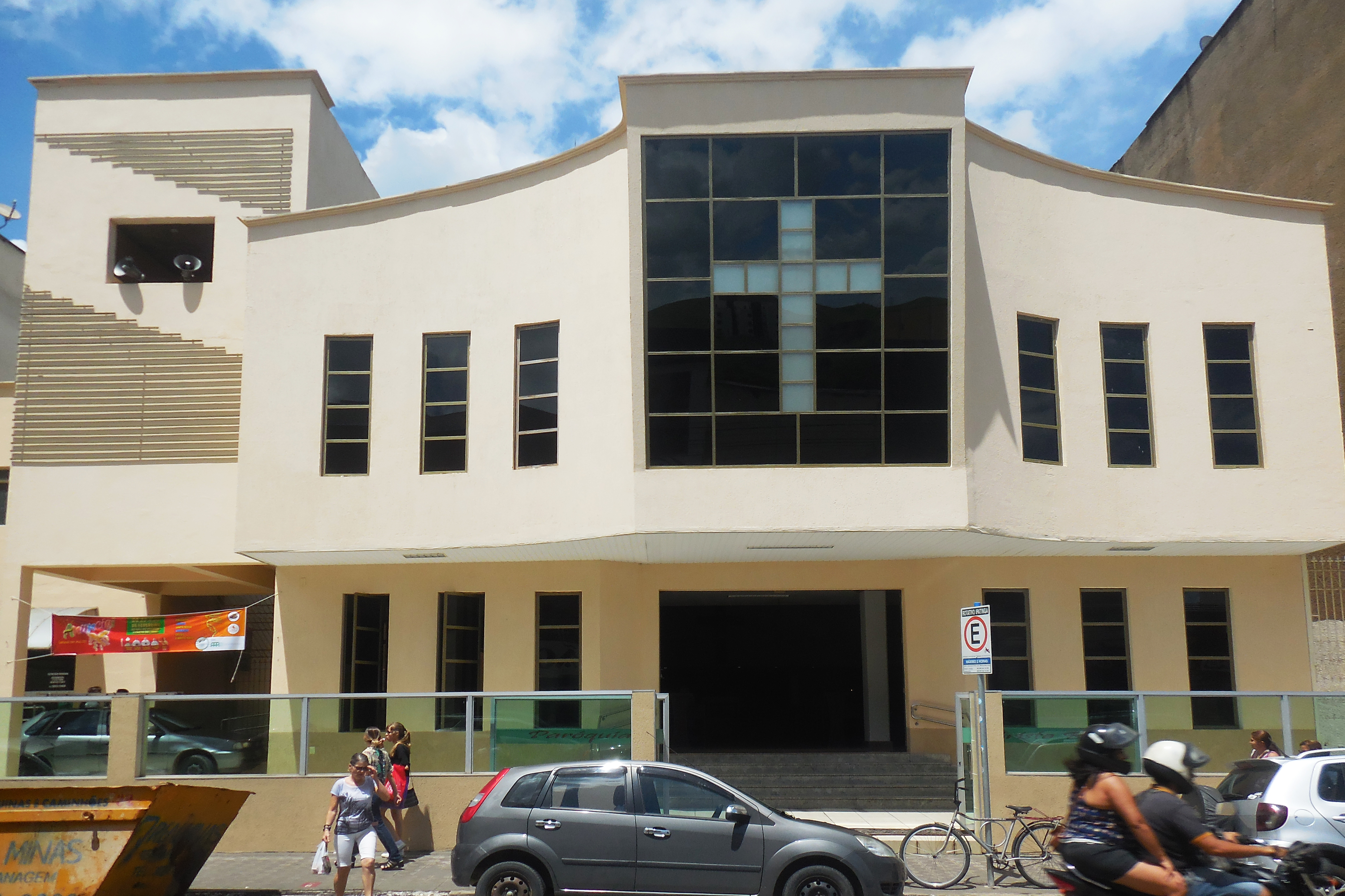
Christ the King Church, in the city center.

In 2022, the population comprised 118,388 pardos (51.99%), 84,207 whites (36.98%), 24,469 blacks (10.74%), 477 Asians (0.21%), and 185 Indigenous people (0.08%). In 2010, by region of birth, 233,822 were born in the Southeast (97.64%), 525 in the North (0.22%), 3,142 in the Northeast (1.31%), 321 in the Central-West (0.13%), and 582 in the South (0.24%). Of the total, 225,656 were born in Minas Gerais (94.23%), with 120,818 born in Ipatinga (50.45%). Among the 13,812 residents born in other states, Espírito Santo had the largest representation with 3,345 people (1.40%), followed by São Paulo with 2,790 (1.16%), and Rio de Janeiro with 2,032 (0.85%).

According to the 2010 IBGE census, the municipal population included 112,763 Catholics (47.09%), 96,203 evangelicals (40.17%), 23,228 people without religion (9.70%), and 3.04% followed other religions. Ipatinga is part of Pastoral Region III of the Diocese of Itabira-Fabriciano and is divided into 10 parishes: Christ the Liberator, Christ the King, Christ the Redeemer, Our Lady of Aparecida, Our Lady of Hope, Holy Family, Sacred Heart of Jesus, Saint Gerard Majella, Saint Peter, and Lord of Bonfim.

== Politics and administration ==
Headquarters of the Ipatinga City Hall, seat of the municipal Executive Branch

Municipal administration in Ipatinga is carried out by the Executive and Legislative powers. The Executive is led by the mayor, supported by a cabinet of secretaries. The first executive representative was José Orozimbo da Silva, appointed as intendant by Governor José de Magalhães Pinto after the city's political emancipation, but Fernando Santos Coura was the first elected mayor, assuming office on 4 December 1965. In the 2024 municipal elections, Gustavo Morais Nunes was re-elected mayor by the Liberal Party (PL) with 44.65% of valid votes for his second consecutive term, alongside José Pedro de Freitas (Pedrão da AAPI, Citizenship) as vice-mayor.

The Legislative Branch consists of the municipal chamber, composed of nineteen councilors. The chamber is responsible for drafting and voting on fundamental laws for administration and the Executive, particularly the participatory budget (budget guidelines law). Complementing the legislative process and secretarial work, active municipal councils include those for children's and adolescents' rights (created in 1995), guardianship (2008), elderly rights (2000), disability rights (2007), and women's policies (2005).

Ipatinga operates under its organic law, enacted on 1 May 1990, and hosts a comarca of special jurisdiction at the Doutora Valéria Vieira Alves Forum, serving the municipalities of Ipaba and Santana do Paraíso. As of September 2024, the city had 180,396 voters, according to the Superior Electoral Court (TSE).

== Subdivisions ==
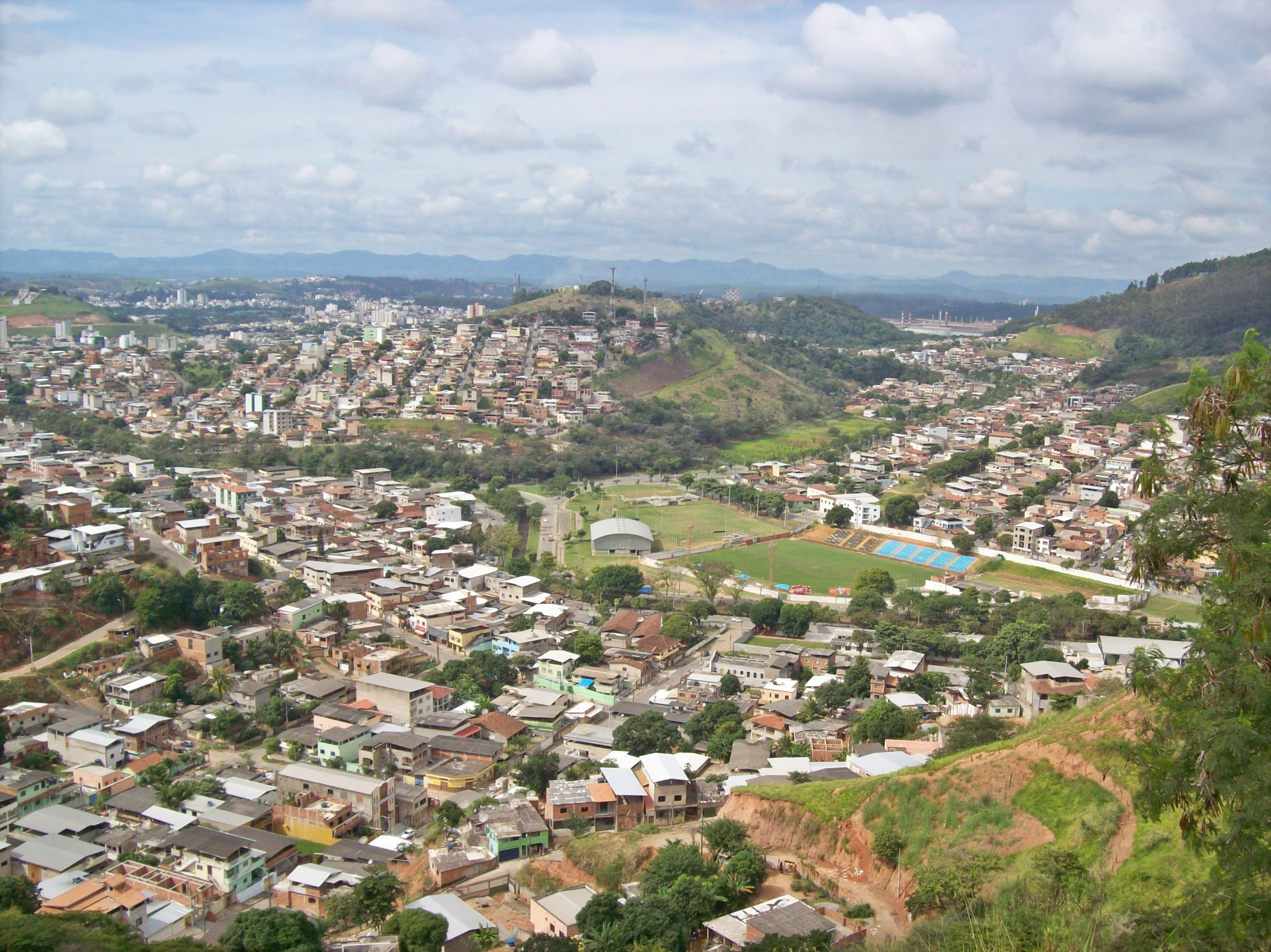
View of the Esperança (foreground), Bom Jardim (background right), and Ideal (background left) neighborhoods

Ipatinga comprises 35 official neighborhoods distributed across nine administrative regions. According to the IBGE in 2022, the most populous neighborhood was Canaã, with 26,569 inhabitants. Neighborhoods in regions V, VII, VIII, and IX, as well as Cidade Nobre (Region III) and Taúbas (Region VI), form the Barra Alegre district, covering 114.85 km². The remaining neighborhoods belong to the seat district, spanning 51.24 km². Region IX constitutes Ipatinga's rural area. The current division, established in 1980, makes Ipatinga the most populous municipality in the Vale do Aço Metropolitan Region but with the fewest neighborhoods compared to Coronel Fabriciano and Timóteo.

The availability of land for urban expansion in Ipatinga is limited, contributing to high population density and a slowdown in population growth since the 1990s. With real estate development constrained, investors have turned to adjacent areas in Santana do Paraíso, where large plots near Ipatinga's Center and the Usiminas complex have spurred numerous subdivisions and constructions, leading to conurbation between the two cities.

== Economy ==
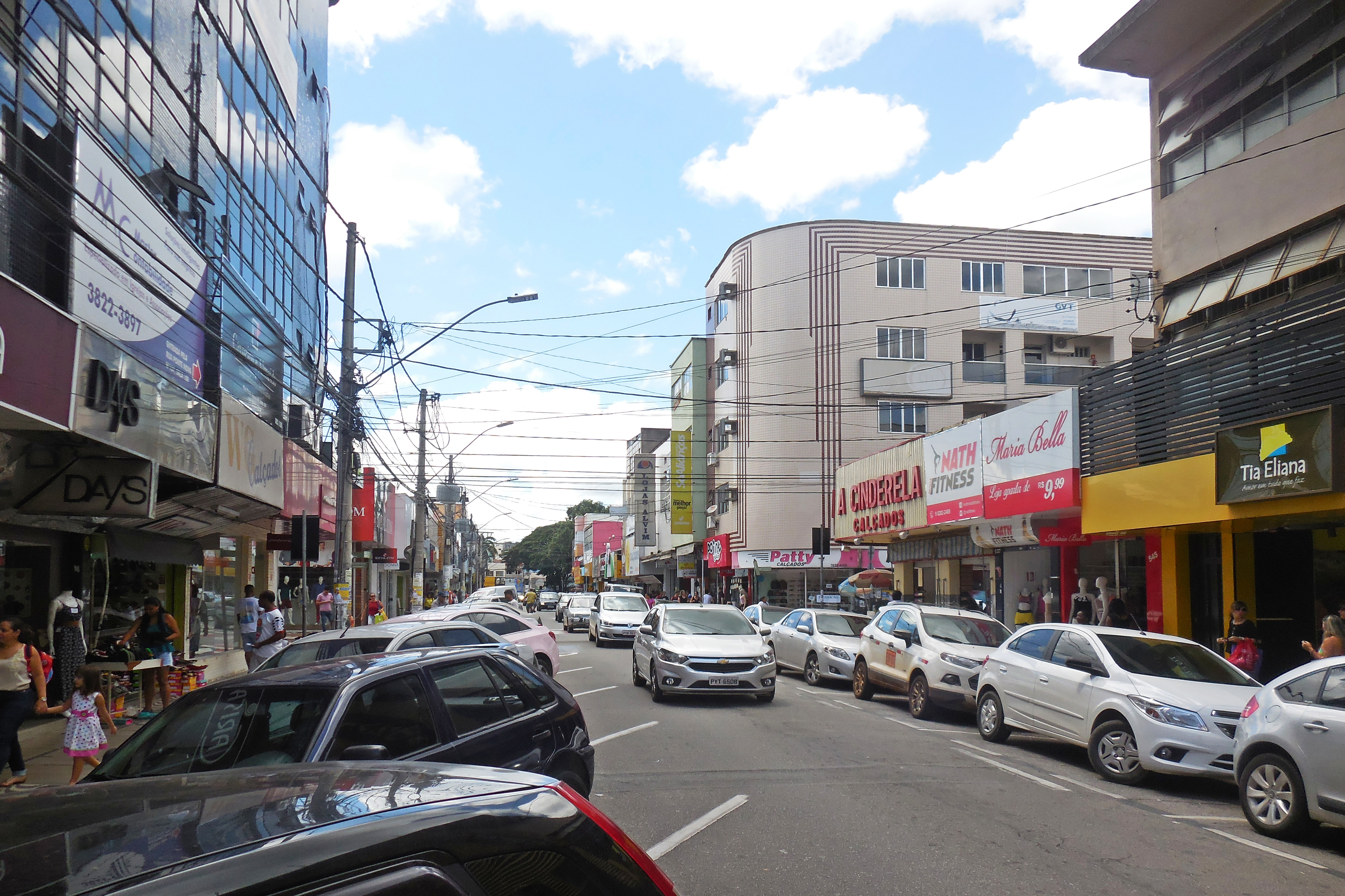
Shops on Avenida 28 de Abril

The gross domestic product (GDP) of Ipatinga is driven primarily by the industrial sector. According to 2021 IBGE data, the municipality's GDP at current prices was R$17,609,176.97 thousand. Of this, R$1,968,496.61 thousand came from net product taxes at current prices, and the per capita GDP was R$65,869.82. In 2010, 65.23% of the population over 18 was economically active, with an unemployment rate of 8.77%. Approximately 10% of the population commuted to other municipalities for work, facilitated by the proximity and accessibility of the Vale do Aço Metropolitan Region.

In 2022, salaries and other remunerations totaled R$2,619,194 thousand, with an average monthly salary of 2.3 minimum wages. The municipality had 12,602 local units and 11,895 active companies. According to the IBGE in 2010, 49.92% of households earned less than one minimum wage per person monthly (36,384 households), 36.82% earned between one and three minimum wages per person (26,840 households), 6.37% earned between three and five minimum wages (4,646 households), 4.09% earned above five minimum wages (2,980 households), and 2.80% had no income (2,040 households).

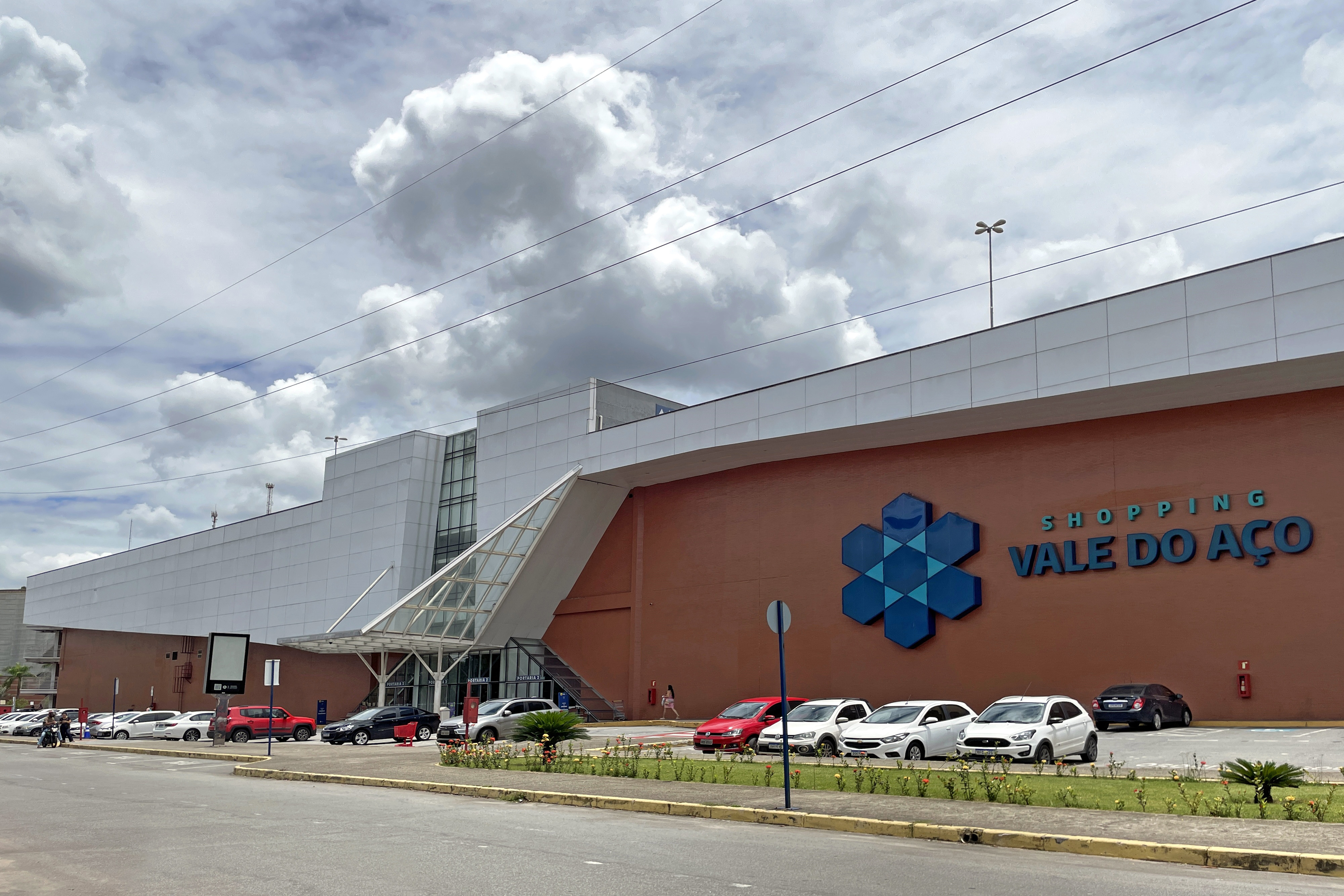
View of the Vale do Aço Shopping Mall, one of the largest shopping centers in inland Minas Gerais

In 2012, the Brazilian Service of Support for Micro and Small Enterprises (SEBRAE) ranked Ipatinga the seventh-best city in Minas Gerais to start a business, but a decline in national and international steel demand led to layoffs and cuts in investments and wages by local industries in the early 2010s. By the early 2020s, the situation had stabilized. From January to November 2024, there was a surplus of 636 jobs in commerce and services, though industry played a smaller role in job creation.

=== Agriculture and livestock ===
In 2021, livestock and agriculture contributed R$3,358.03 thousand to Ipatinga's economy, with 0.75% of the economically active population employed in the sector in 2010. According to the IBGE in 2023, the municipality had 4,700 poultry, 2,137 cattle, 197 horses, 174 pigs, 44 sheep, 35 buffaloes, and three goats. That year, the city produced 406,000 liters of milk from 334 cows, 8,000 dozen chicken eggs from 730 hens, and 9,700 kg of honey. In aquaculture, 2,300 kg of tilapia were produced. According to state government data, Ipatinga and Timóteo were the top two municipalities exporting honey in Minas Gerais in 2019. In 2023, watermelon was the largest crop in temporary agriculture by planted area (12 hectares), followed by sugarcane, cassava, and corn, which were each planted on 1 hectare. In permanent crops, banana led with 18 hectares, followed by orange and papaya (each at 1 hectare).

=== Industry and services ===
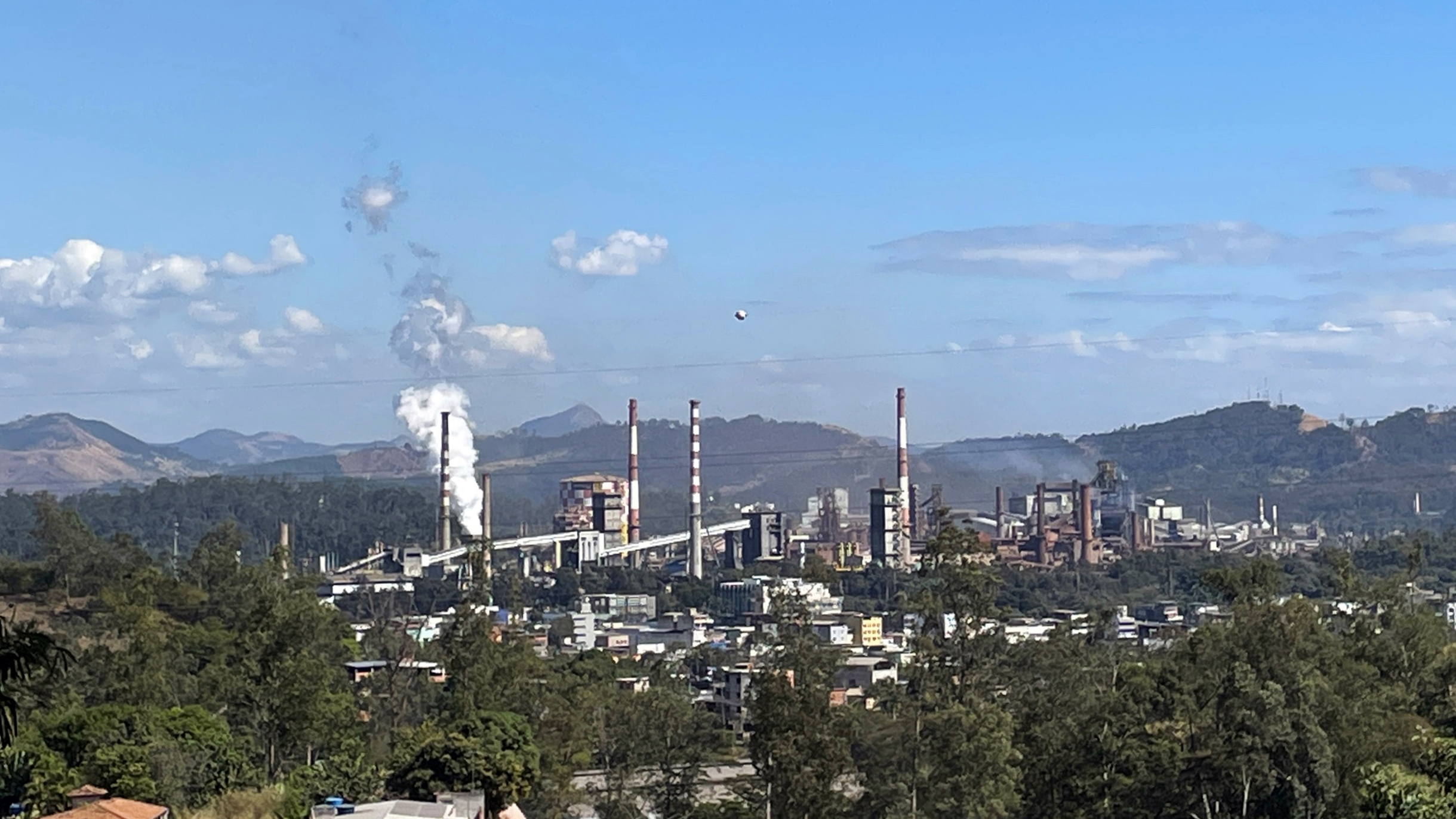
Usiminas factory viewed from the Cidade Nova neighborhood

In 2021, industry was the leading economic sector, contributing R$9,195,871.95 thousand to the municipal GDP's gross added value. Much of this is driven by Usiminas, which exports a significant volume of steel, stainless steel, and metalworking products. The industrial complex attracts supplier, complementary, and service companies to Ipatinga and surrounding municipalities. An industrial district, established in 1998, spans approximately 35,113,336 m².

Other industrial activities include the manufacture of clothing and accessories, the extraction and processing of non-metallic minerals, the production of furniture, food and beverages, and the fabrication of metallurgical products. The Cenibra cellulose plant in Belo Oriente is supported by eucalyptus extraction. In 2023, the IBGE reported 2,265 cubic meters of eucalyptus logs extracted, with 84.55% used for paper and cellulose production. In 2010, 0.39% of workers were in extractive industries and 21.42% in manufacturing.

In 2010, 8.91% of the workforce was employed in construction, 1.02% in public utilities, 18.41% in commerce, and 41.89% in services. In 2021, services contributed R$5,138,968.03 thousand and public administration R$1,302,482.34 thousand to the GDP's gross added value. Commerce is prominent along Avenida 28 de Abril (formerly Rua do Comércio) in the Center, revitalized in the 1990s. The Center, along with Bom Retiro, Canaã, Horto, and Veneza, serves as a metropolitan hub, attracting consumers from nearby cities due to public services and commerce. Regular street markets operate in some neighborhoods, such as the Ipatingão Market at the João Lamego Netto Municipal Stadium parking lot. The Vale do Aço Shopping Mall, near Horto, is one of the largest shopping centers in inland Minas Gerais.

== Infrastructure ==
=== Healthcare ===
Unit 1 of Márcio Cunha Hospital in the Das Águas neighborhood

Ipatinga's healthcare network, as of 2018, includes 22 primary health units, three health centers, two general hospitals, and two Psychosocial Care Centers (CAPS). In 2010, there were 0.52 nurses, 1.07 dentists, and 1.5 doctors per 1,000 inhabitants, compared to national averages of 0.69, 0.54, and 1.5, respectively. The Ipatinga Municipal Hospital is the primary public facility for emergency care and inpatient beds.

The Márcio Cunha Hospital, managed by the São Francisco Xavier Foundation (FSFX) under Usiminas, is a reference for high-complexity services such as oncology and hemodialysis, and provides care through the Unified Health System (SUS). It is the only transplant center in eastern and northeastern Minas Gerais, serving multiple cities. Since 2017, it has housed the region's first and only pediatric oncology center, serving 86 municipalities and reducing the need for patients to travel to Belo Horizonte.

Ipatinga has four cemeteries, with the main one, Parque Nossa Senhora da Paz, located in the Veneza II neighborhood. The others are in Barra Alegre, Bom Jardim, and Ipaneminha. In 2022, 1,535 deaths were recorded due to morbidity, with circulatory system diseases being the leading cause (26.78%), followed by neoplasms (20%). That year, 2,764 live births were recorded, with an infant mortality rate of 7.96 deaths per 1,000 live births for children under one year. In 2010, 1.24% of girls aged 10–17 had children.

=== Education ===
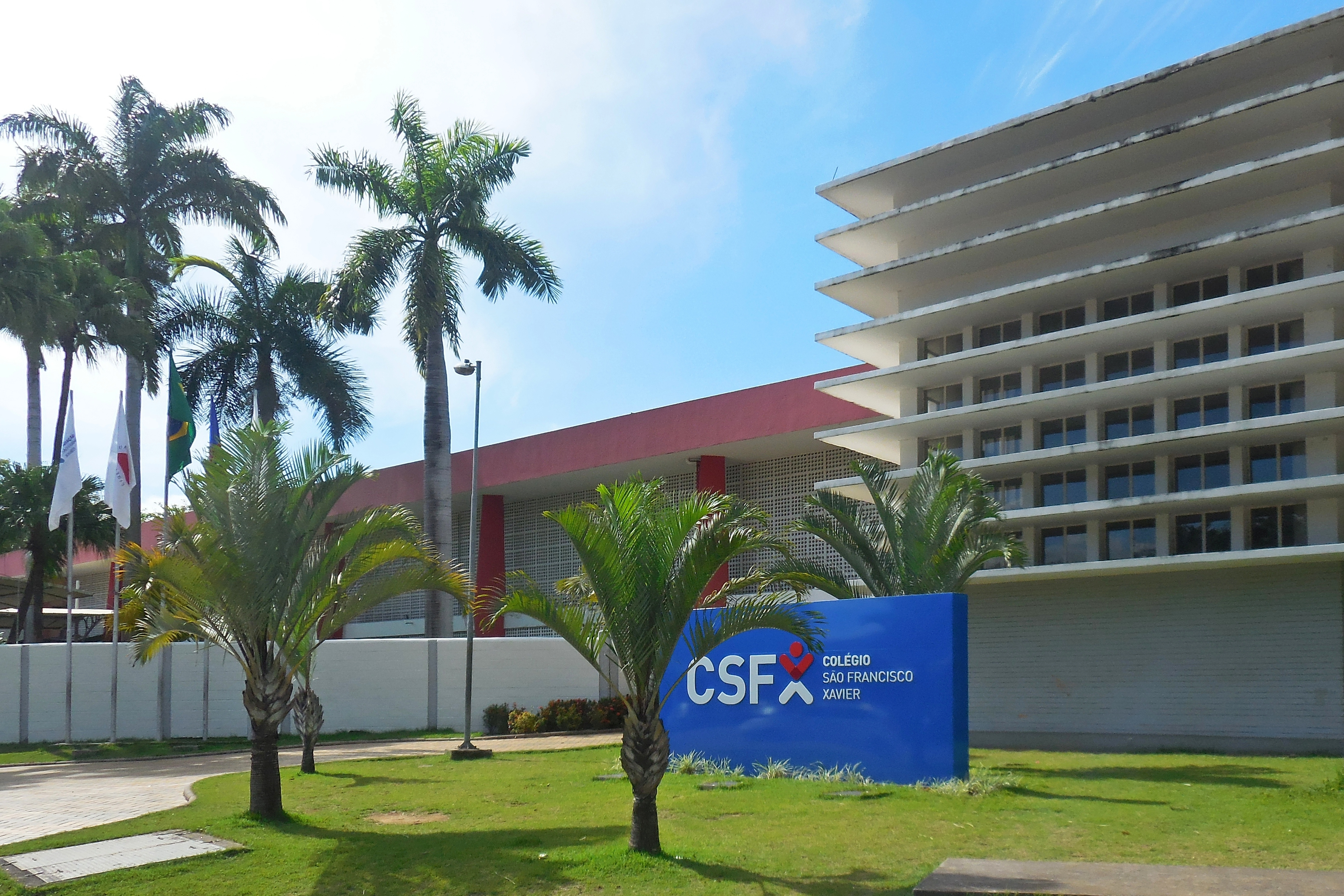
Facade of São Francisco Xavier School, the first private educational institution, founded by Usiminas in 1952

In 2023, the Basic Education Development Index (IDEB) for Ipatinga's public schools averaged 6.5 for early elementary years and 5.2 for later elementary years, on a scale of 1 to 10. In 2022, 38.38% of children aged 0–3, 89.45% of those aged 4–5, 98.26% of those aged 6–14, and 85.76% of adolescents aged 15–17 were enrolled in schools. Additionally, 25.82% of 18–24-year-olds and 4.5% of those 25 and older attended educational institutions.

In 2022, among residents aged 18 or older in Ipatinga, 27.32% had not completed elementary education, 15.83% had only completed elementary education, 39.08% had completed high school, and 17.77% had completed higher education. The population aged 11 or older had an average of 10.1 years of schooling. The literacy rate among residents aged 15 or older was 96.4%, leaving 3.6% of this age group illiterate. In 2023, a total of 47,072 students were enrolled in the city's pre-school, primary and secondary education institutions.

In the overall ranking of the 2022 National High School Exam (ENEM), the Fibonacci School achieved an average score of 736.64 (on a scale from 1 to 1,000), securing first place in the state ranking and second place nationally. Regarding higher education, a campus of the Federal Institute of Minas Gerais (IFMG) was established in 2014, and in 2024, the creation of a campus for the Federal University of Ouro Preto (UFOP) was announced. Additionally, there are campuses of private technical and higher education institutions, including the Catholic University Center of Eastern Minas Gerais (Unileste), the Ipatinga Law School (FADIPA), and the Afya Faculty of Medical Sciences of Ipatinga (formerly FAMEVAÇO).

Education in Ipatinga by numbers (2023)
Level	Enrollments	Teachers	Schools (Total)
Early childhood education	10,286	792	92
Primary education	27,904	1,607	73
Secondary school	8,882	624	24

== Housing and services ==
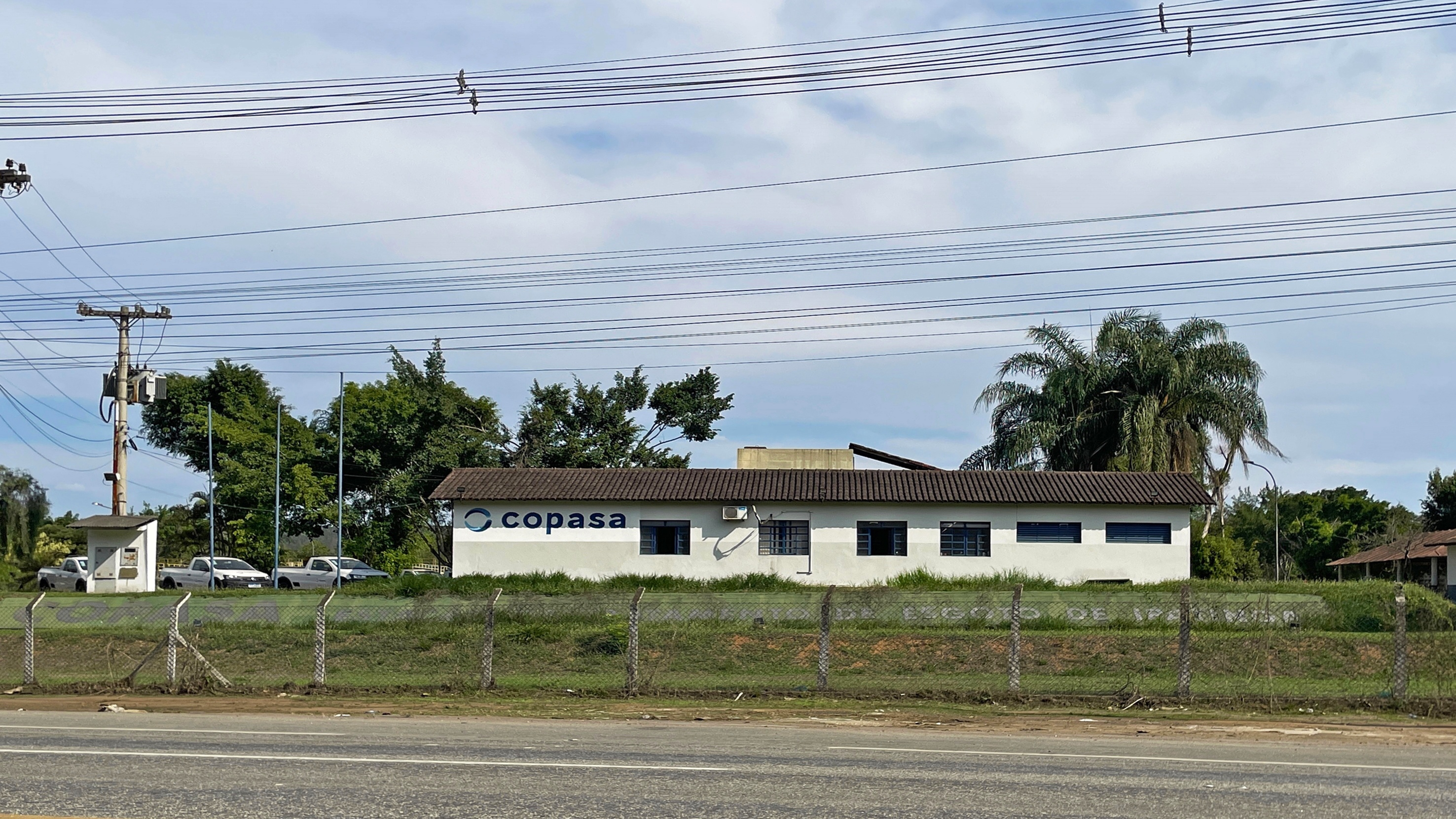
Wastewater treatment plant operated by Copasa, located near the mouth of the Ipanema stream

In 2022, there were 85,709 occupied, permanent private households in Ipatinga. Of these, 60,240 were houses (70.28%), 24,792 were apartments (28.93%), 195 were townhouses or condominiums (0.23%), 411 were tenements (0.48%), and 71 were dilapidated or unfinished structures (0.08%). Of the total occupied households, 53,341 were owned (62.24%), with 49,075 fully paid and 4,266 under acquisition; 26,748 were rented (31.21%); 5,445 were borrowed or provided (6.35%); and 162 were occupied in other forms (0.19%). The Municipal Master Plan sets out the geographical and urban parameters for the construction of residences, buildings and commercial establishments. Among various aspects, the master plan regulates the occupation and verticalization of the city. Certain neighborhoods, such as Cariru, Castelo, and Das Águas, have specific legislation prohibiting the construction of high-rise buildings.

Water supply and sewage collection services are provided by the Minas Gerais Sanitation Company (Copasa). In 2022, according to IBGE, 90.09% of households relied on the general water network as their primary water supply, and 99.93% had exclusive-use bathrooms. Regarding sewage treatment, 98.54% of households were served by the general or stormwater sewer system. The water used to supply the Vale do Aço region originates from an alluvial aquifer located underground, extracted and treated at the Copasa water treatment plant in the Amaro Lanari neighborhood of Coronel Fabriciano. Sewage treatment is facilitated by four wastewater treatment plants distributed throughout the municipality.

Electricity supply is managed by the Energy Company of Minas Gerais (Cemig), which serves much of the state of Minas Gerais. According to IBGE, 99.9% of households had access to the electrical network in 2010. Regarding waste disposal, the 2022 census indicated that 99.82% of households were served by waste collection services. Until 1988, the city's waste was disposed of in an open-air landfill, which was later treated and covered. In 2003, the Vale do Aço Waste Center (CRVA) was inaugurated in Santana do Paraíso, handling waste from Ipatinga and other municipalities in the Vale do Aço region. In addition, waste pickers maintain an informal system for collecting recyclable materials.

== Safety and crime ==
Number of homicides in Ipatinga
Year	Total	Year	Total	Year	Total
2002	35	2009	35	2016	42
2003	39	2010	59	2017	28
2004	46	2011	55	2018	38
2005	30	2012	64	2019	29
2006	27	2013	57	2020	31
2007	48	2014	43	2021	31
2008	47	2015	55	2022	29

Public safety in Ipatinga is provided by various agencies. The Military Police of Minas Gerais State are responsible for visible policing in cities, including patrolling banks, prisons, schools and special events, as well as carrying out social integration activities. Ipatinga serves as the headquarters of the 12th Military Police Region and hosts a PMMG Battalion. The Minas Gerais Civil Police focuses on investigating crimes and infractions and is represented in Ipatinga by the 1st Regional Police Station, overseeing Integrated Public Safety Areas (AISP) comprising regional municipalities. Additionally, the city has a Federal Police station to decentralize operations and address regional demands. Ipatinga is also home to a Firefighters Battalion and a civil defence unit operated by the municipal administration.

In 2022, Ipatinga recorded 29 homicides, a decrease from 31 in 2021. However, this translated to a rate of 12.7 homicides per 100,000 inhabitants, ranking 22nd among Minas Gerais municipalities. Additionally, issues with thefts and robberies targeting pedestrians and commercial establishments are common. Most homicides are linked to drug trafficking, which also contributes to other crimes, as users often steal to sustain their addictions. Much of the prison population is housed in the Prisoner Relocation Center (CERESP), which has faced allegations of torture and mistreatment of inmates and has been the site of riots and vandalism by inmates.

== Communications ==
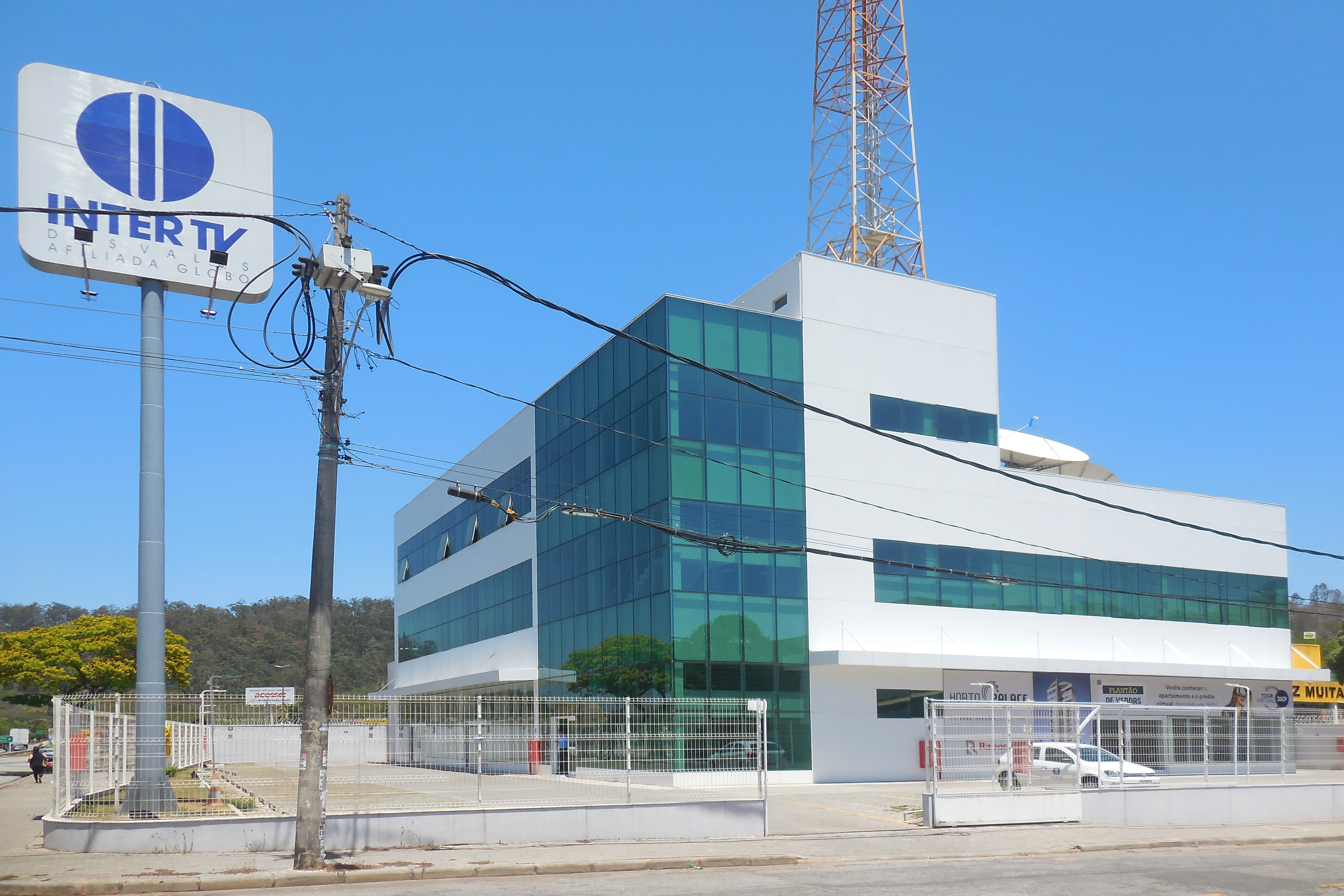
Branch of InterTV dos Vales in the Horto neighborhood

In August 2015, Ipatinga had 1,007 payphones, according to data from Oi, the company managing fixed-line telephony services, despite their declining use due to the rise of mobile telephony. The area code (DDD) for Ipatinga is 031, and the Postal Code (CEP) ranges from 35150-001 to 35169-999. In January 2009, the Vale do Aço Metropolitan Region adopted number portability, along with other cities sharing the same DDD. Postal services are provided by branches of the Correios in the neighborhoods of Betânia, Bom Jardim, Bom Retiro, Cariru, Centro, Horto, Iguaçu, and Veneza.

In terms of media, Ipatinga is a hub for InterTV dos Vales, an affiliate of TV Globo, with programming produced in Governador Valadares. Its coverage extends to most of the Rio Doce Valley and parts of the Mucuri Valley. TV Cultura Vale do Aço, affiliated with TV Cultura and Rede Minas, is also based in Ipatinga, covering parts of the RMVA and its metropolitan belt. Among local daily newspapers, Diário do Aço and Diário Popular stand out. The city is also home to several radio stations, including Itatiaia Vale do Aço, Jovem Pan FM, and Vanguarda. In 2012, according to Praxis Pesquisa, approximately 134,680 residents aged over 16 listened to radio (74% of that age group).

== Transportation ==
=== Railway ===
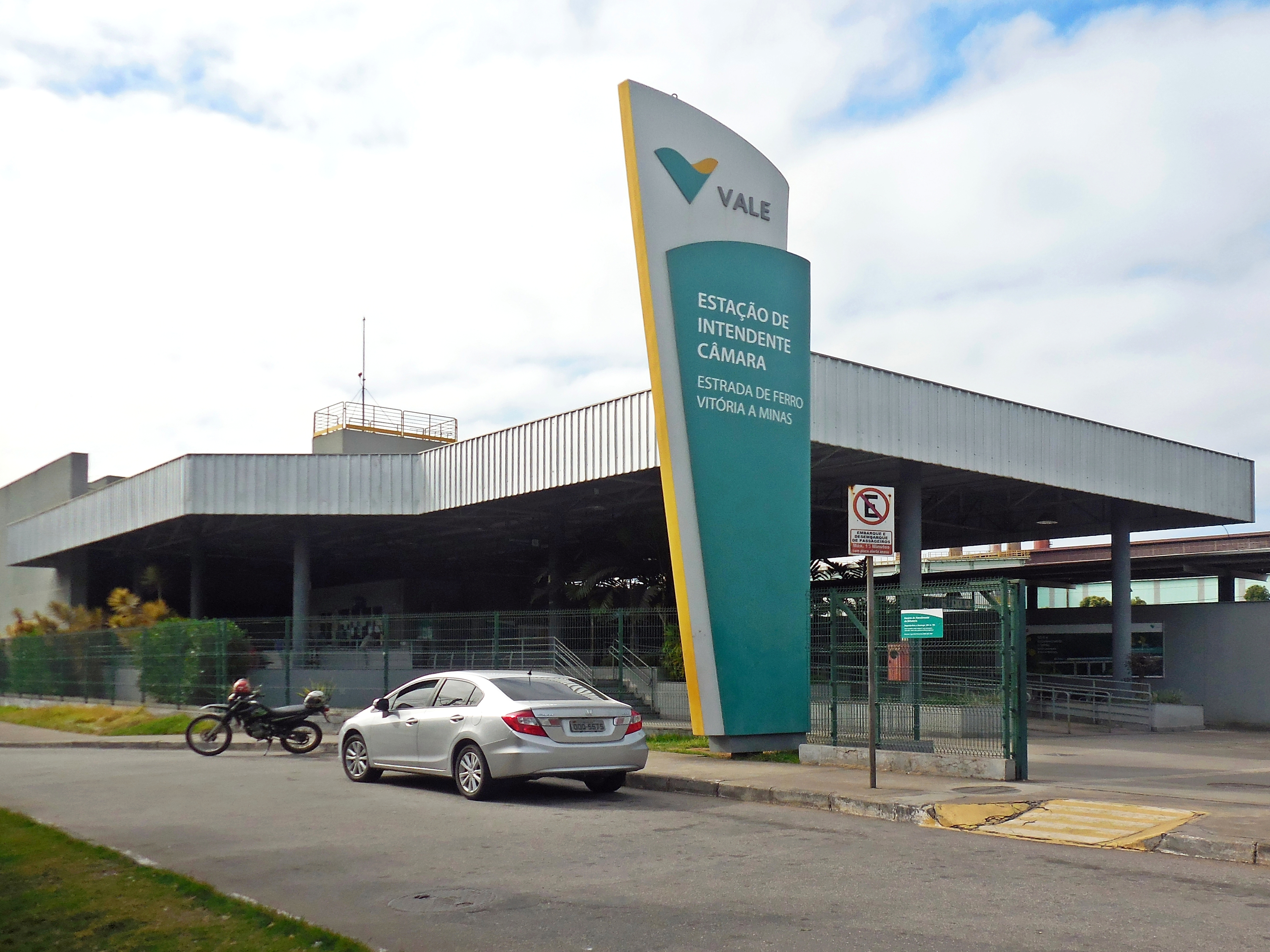
Intendente Câmara Station

Ipatinga is served by the Vitória-Minas Railway (EFVM), managed by Vale, which is a key route for transporting Usiminas production to the Port of Tubarão in Espírito Santo. The Intendente Câmara Station, located in the Ferroviários neighborhood, facilitates passenger transport with daily stops for trains traveling between the metropolitan areas of Vitória and Belo Horizonte. The EFVM is the cheapest and safest regular public transport option for several cities with stations.

Railway transport has been integral to Ipatinga since its early days, with the construction of the Pedra Mole Station near the Cariru neighborhood in 1922. A change in the EFVM route led to the construction of a new terminal in the city center in 1930 to replace the original, but another alteration in the railway layout resulted in its deactivation in 1951 and the establishment of the current Intendente Câmara Station in 1960. The Pedra Mole Station was designated a cultural heritage site in 1996, but remained abandoned until 2019, when its ruins were opened for visitation. The former Ipatinga Station in the city center was also designated a cultural heritage site in 1991 and converted into a museum in 1992.

=== Air and road ===
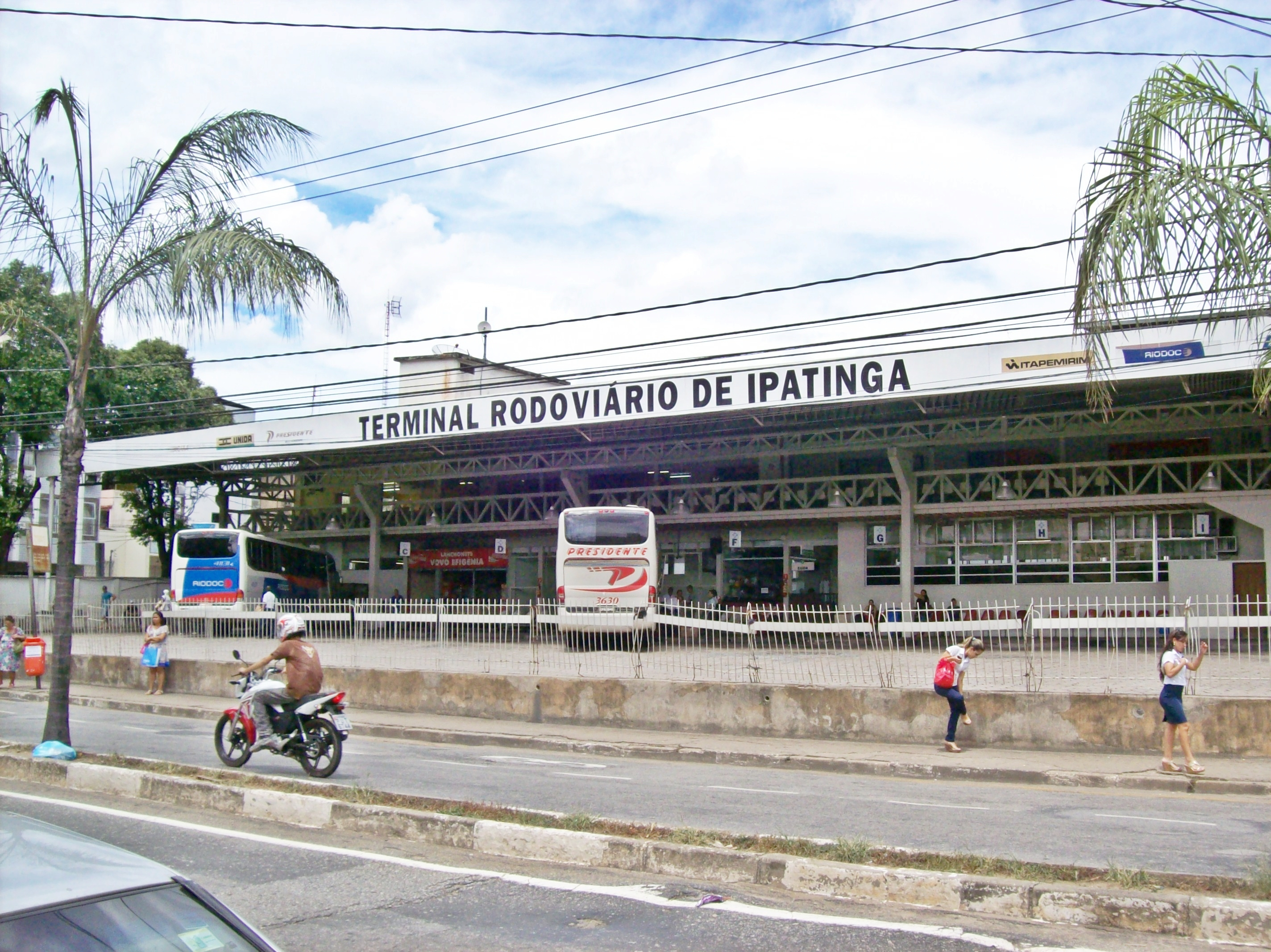
View of the Ipatinga Bus Terminal

Air transport in the municipality is facilitated by the Ipatinga Airport (IATA: IPN, ICAO: SBIP), known as the Vale do Aço Regional Airport (formerly Usiminas Airport), located in the neighboring municipality of Santana do Paraíso. Built by Usiminas, it is approximately 3 km from Ipatinga's city center and serves the Vale do Aço Metropolitan Region with daily flights to the Belo Horizonte Metropolitan Area, with potential for various connections, though it previously offered other destinations. The airport covers an area of about 700,000 m², with an asphalt runway measuring 2,004 m in length and 45 m in width, and an apron measuring 72.5 m x 285 m.

Ipatinga has one of the largest bus terminals in the region, located in the city center, with regular daily departures to major cities in Minas Gerais and beyond. The city is intersected by the BR-381, the main access route to the state capital and Espírito Santo; it is also the starting point of the BR-458, connecting the Vale do Aço to the BR-116, and the MG-232, linking to Santana do Paraíso and the MG-010. The BR-381 runs parallel to the EFVM, and this axis has guided the urban occupation and expansion process since the second half of the 20th century. Although the urban section of the BR-381 has dual carriageways, the lack of duplication along most of its length causes access to the city to be hindered by heavy traffic.

=== Urban ===
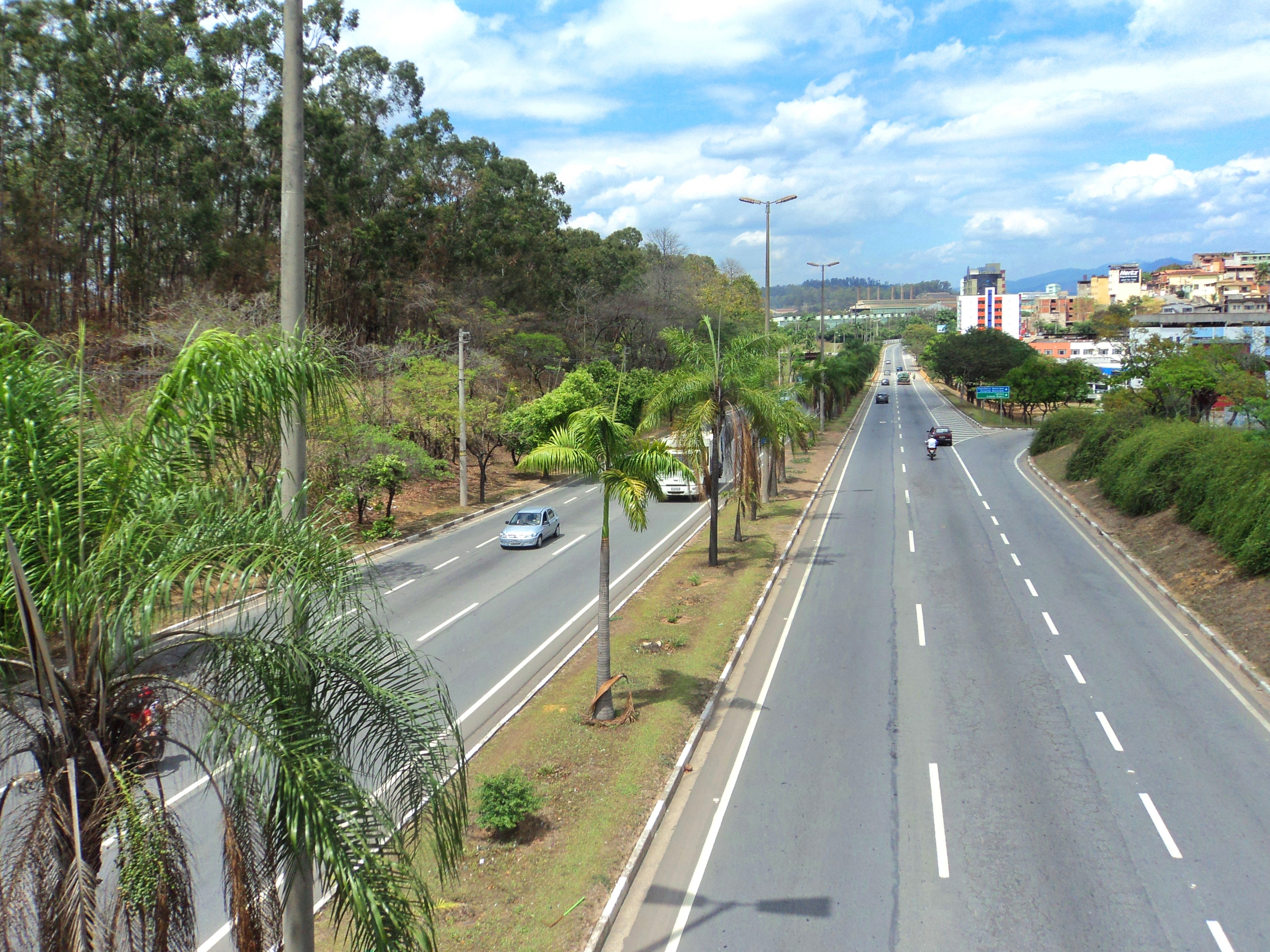
Pedro Linhares Gomes Avenue, urban section of BR-381, in the Iguaçu neighborhood

In 2023, the municipal vehicle fleet totaled 164,028, comprising 92,367 cars, 39,766 motorcycles, 11,028 pickup trucks, 5,259 vans, 3,496 trailers, 3,343 trucks, 2,542 mopeds, 1,706 utility vehicles, 1,073 semi-trailers, 991 mopeds, 846 buses, 833 truck-tractors, 665 minibuses, 53 wheeled tractors, 41 tricycles, five sidecars, two platform chassis, and 12 other vehicle types. The growing number of vehicles in Ipatinga contributes to increasingly slow traffic, particularly in the city center.

Near commercial hubs, parking availability is often limited, impacting local businesses. Consequently, measures such as paid parking systems have been implemented. From January to November 2023, Ipatinga recorded 4,020 traffic accidents, the eighth highest in Minas Gerais, with 83.34% classified as minor and 15.73% as serious. The Pedro Linhares Gomes Avenue, the urban section of BR-381, recorded the highest number of accidents in the Vale do Aço from 2014 to 2024, with 4,000 incidents, followed by Avenida José Selim de Sales with 2,101.

Public transportation is managed by Saritur, operating 55 urban and rural bus lines with 108 vehicles, as of July 2015. Viação Univale provides intermunicipal lines connecting Ipatinga to other municipalities in the Vale do Aço Metropolitan Region and some surrounding areas. The city also has an extensive bike lane network, approximately 40 kilometers long, according to 2015 municipal data. However, sidewalk infrastructure is deficient in many neighborhoods, with issues such as irregularities, obstacles, and discontinuous surfaces.

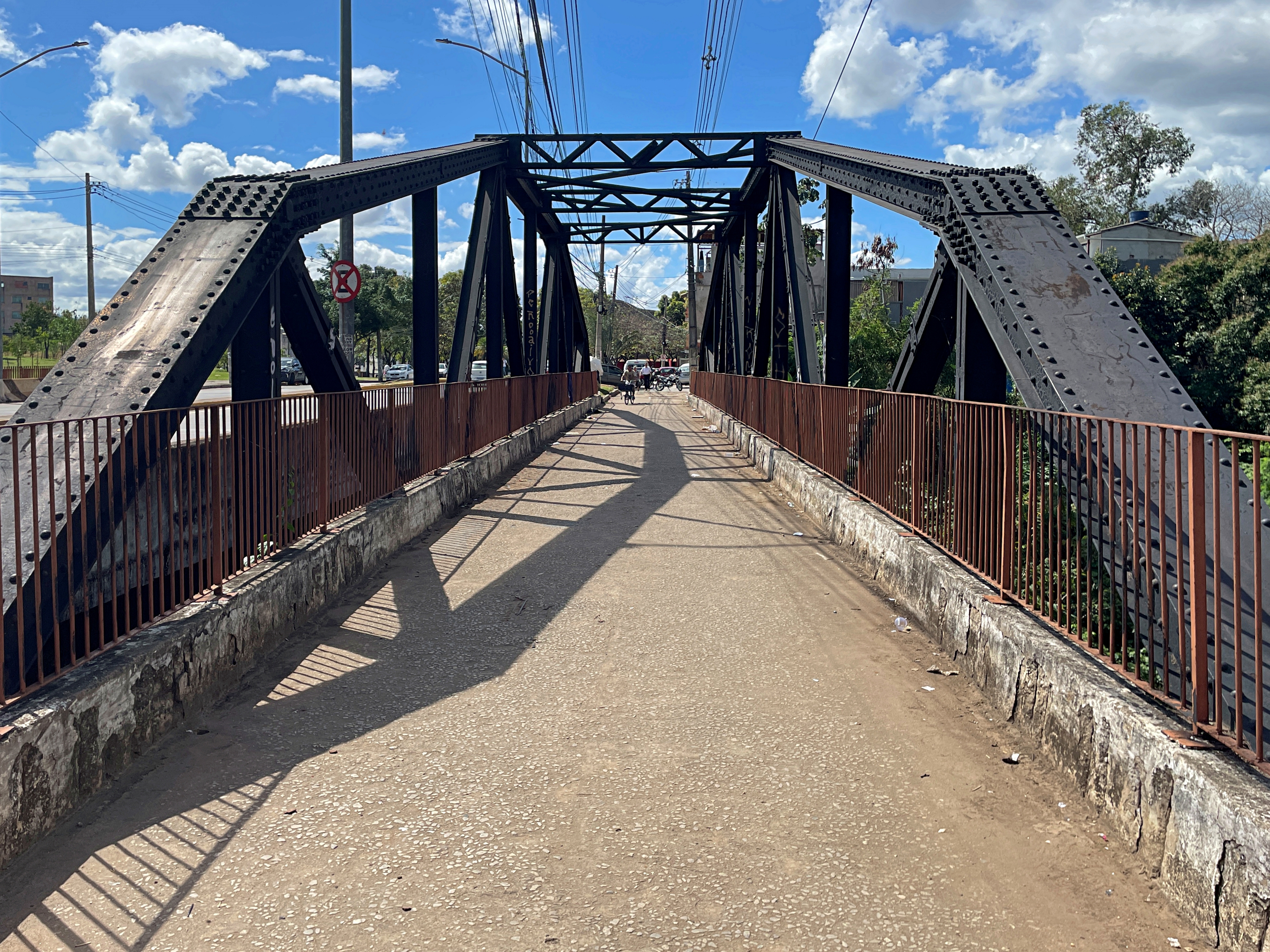
Iron Bridge between the Centro and Veneza neighborhoods, inherited from the former EFVM route that crossed the city.

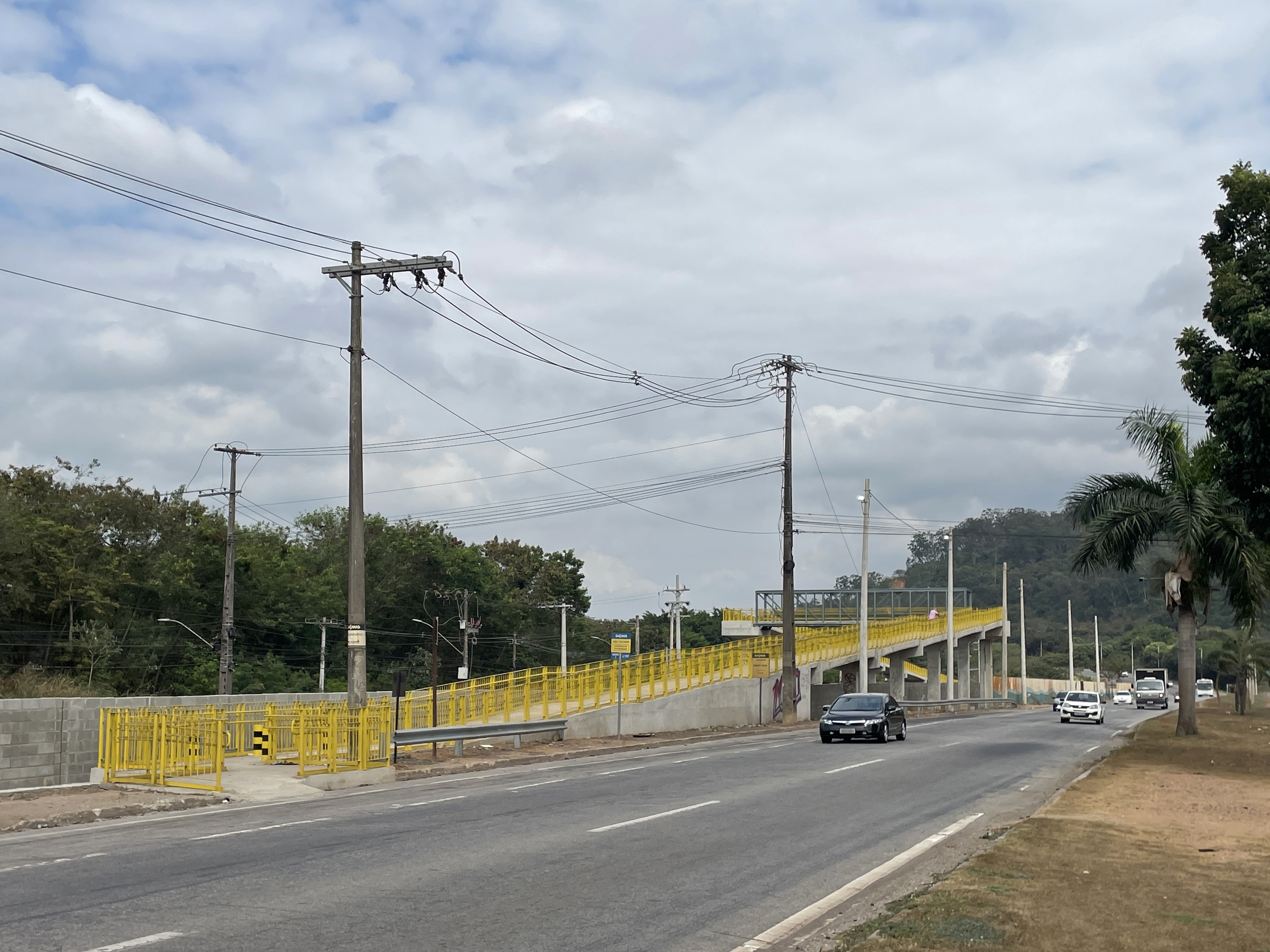
Pedestrian overpass above the Vitória-Minas Railway, lacking continuity over Pedro Linhares Gomes Avenue.

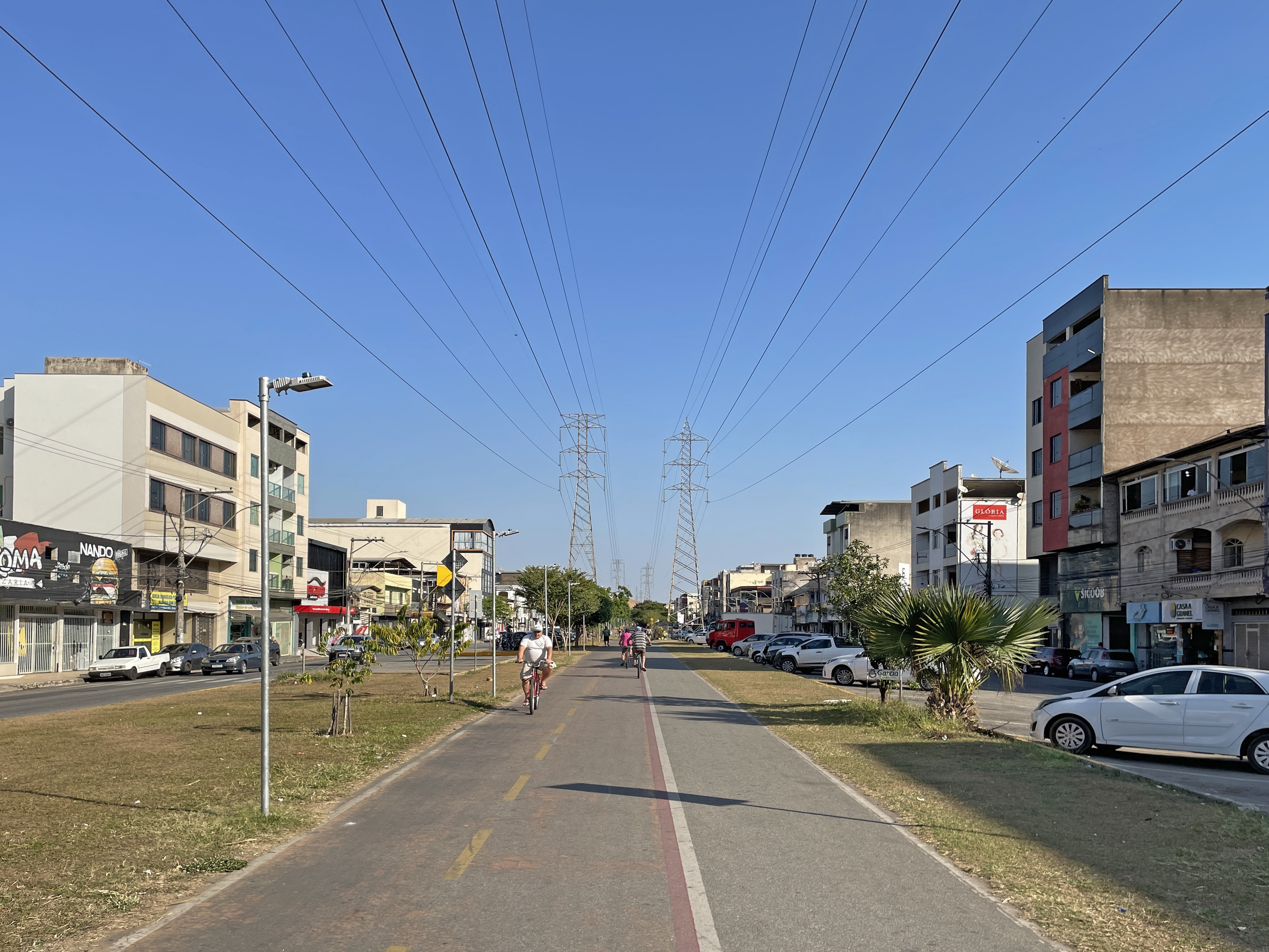
Bike lane along Selim José de Sales Avenue in the Canaã neighborhood.

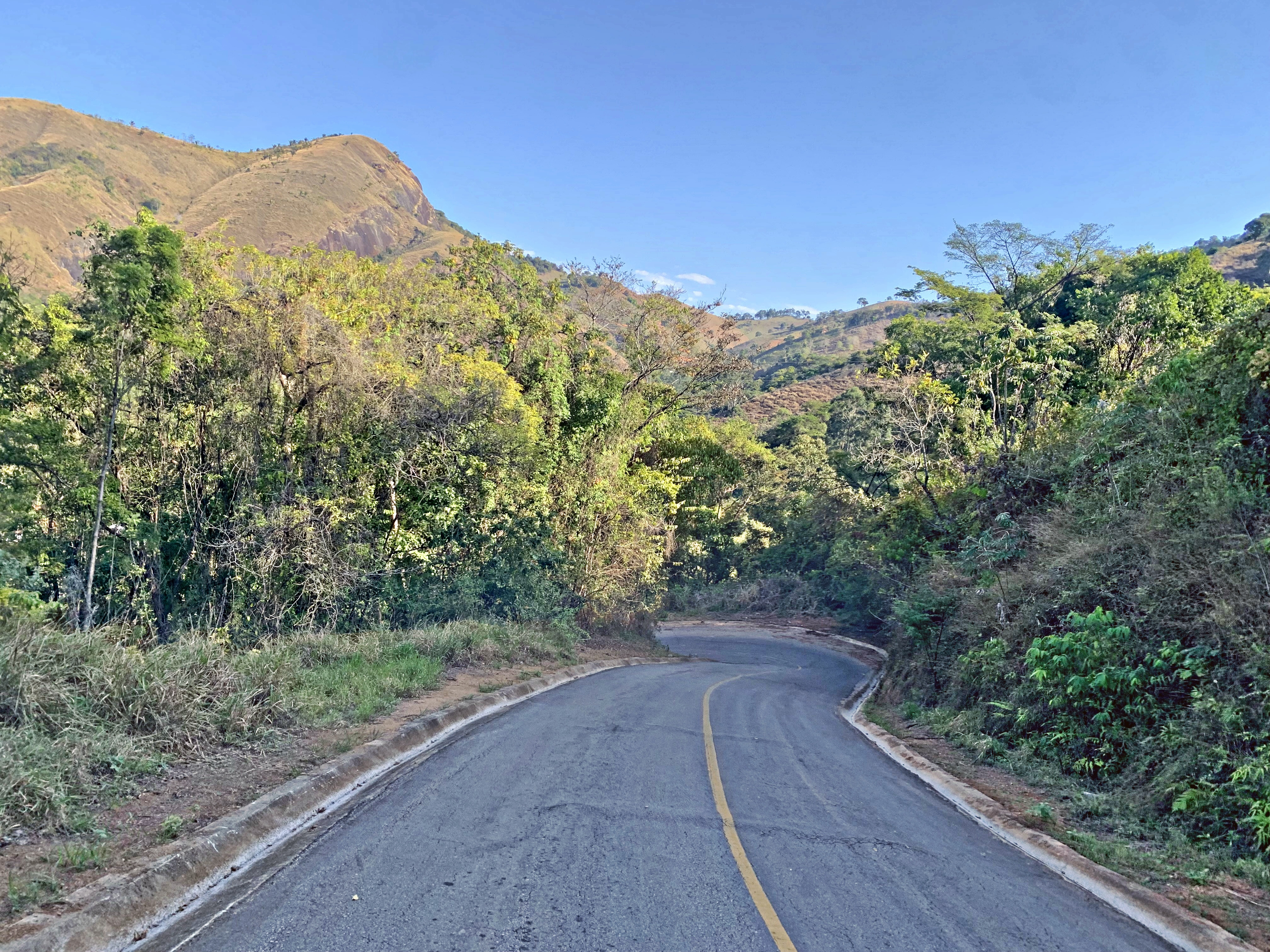
Paved section of the Ipaneminha Road (AIP-130) in Ipatinga's rural area.

== Culture ==
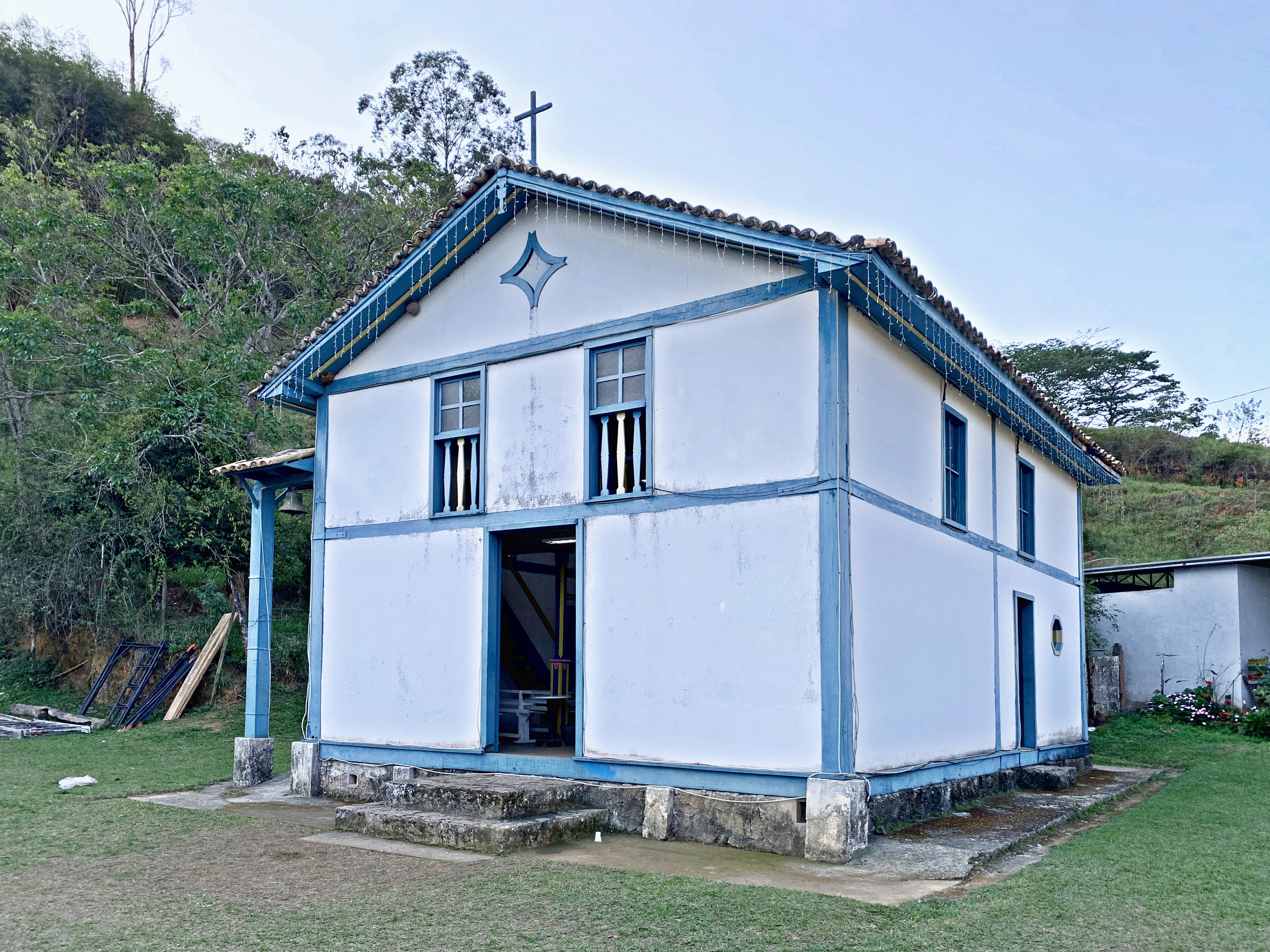
The São Vicente de Paulo Church in Ipaneminha, an example of a listed municipal cultural heritage asset.

When Usiminas was established, the only leisure options in Ipatinga were small bars. Heavy work at the plant, long lines at restaurants, cultural differences, and distance from families strained relations among residents, many of whom came from diverse regions of Brazil. These factors contributed to the unrest that culminated in the Ipatinga Massacre in 1963, prompting the adoption of social assistance policies to mitigate workplace conflicts, including increased investment in leisure facilities.

For the 2024 ICMS Cultural Tax calculation, Ipatinga's cultural policy score was 3.60 on a scale of 0 to 4, with a total score of 16.84 based on factors such as conservation, expenditure, and the number of listed or registered heritage assets. In addition to its work in public administration, Usiminas supports arts and cultural facilities, including those funded through the Federal Cultural Incentive Law.

Ipatinga has a municipal culture council and a heritage preservation council, with provisions for heritage listing of tangible and intangible assets. As of 2020, listed tangible assets included: the São Vicente de Paulo Church (Ipaneminha Church), the Nossa Senhora do Rosário Dance Club (headquarters of the Ipaneminha Congado), the Fazendinha in the Ferroviários neighborhood, the ruins of the former Pedra Mole Station, the Old Ipatinga Railway Station (Zeza Souto Memory Station), the Iron Bridge over the Ipanema River between Centro and Veneza, the Railway Workers' Houses in Veneza, the Nossa Senhora da Esperança Church (Horto Church), the Zélia Olguin Theater, the rubber fig tree in Cariru, the former Grande Hotel Ipatinga building in Castelo, the Olguin Academy, the Ipanema Park, and the Pouso de Água Limpa Station complex. The Nossa Senhora do Rosário Congado (Ipaneminha Congado) was the only listed intangible asset.

=== Cultural events and spaces ===
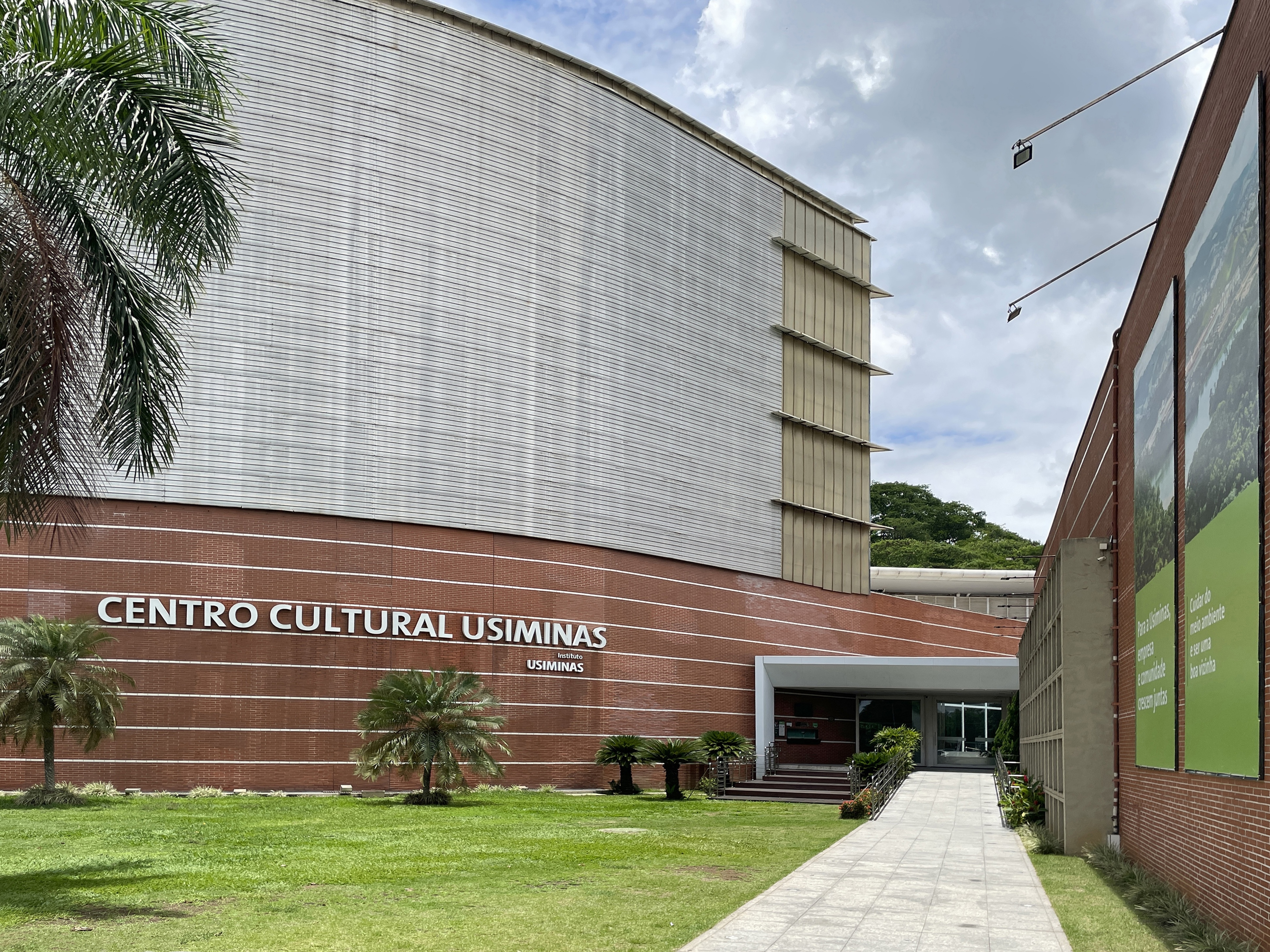
Entrance to the Usiminas Cultural Center, located next to the Vale do Aço Shopping Mall.

Ipatinga boasts a rich and diverse folklore. According to 2012 IBGE data, the city is home to artistic groups specialising in theatre, dance, choirs, folklore, and music. A prominent cultural event is the Ipaneminha Congado, a traditional fandango group that performs marches in honor of Our Lady of the Rosary during festive occasions. This tradition, derived from African roots, was established in 1925 by descendants of muleteers. Other popular cultural events include the Folia de Reis, the Feast of the Divine, the Feast of the Rosary, Bumba Meu Boi, June festivals, and the Banana Festival. In Corpus Christi, certain parishes create carpets in local neighbourhoods.

Handicrafts are an important part of Ipatinga's cultural identity. According to the IBGE, the most common crafts are embroidery and the production of leather and metal artefacts. In rural areas, ceramics and mosaic crafts complement agrotourism activities. Rural tourism also involves sampling the local cuisine, which includes homemade jams, liqueurs, honey, cheeses, breads, desserts, and meals prepared on wood-burning stoves. These products can be enjoyed at farms, properties, and rural establishments open to visitors.

Cultural spaces dedicated to preserving and promoting popular traditions include municipal libraries, theaters, stadiums, sports complexes, cinemas, clubs, and recreational associations, as reported by IBGE in 2005 and 2012. The old central railway station, opened in 1930 and deactivated in 1951, was repurposed as a museum in 1992. Named the Zeza Souto Memory Station, it hosts cultural activities and historical documents related to the city. Under the Federal Cultural Incentive Law, Usiminas, in partnership with the municipality, organizes diverse programs, including workshops, cultural performances, and cinema screenings, held in schools and public squares for the general population. The municipality supports initiatives such as the Tenente Oswaldo Machado Music School and the Sete de Outubro Theater School, offering classes for various age groups.

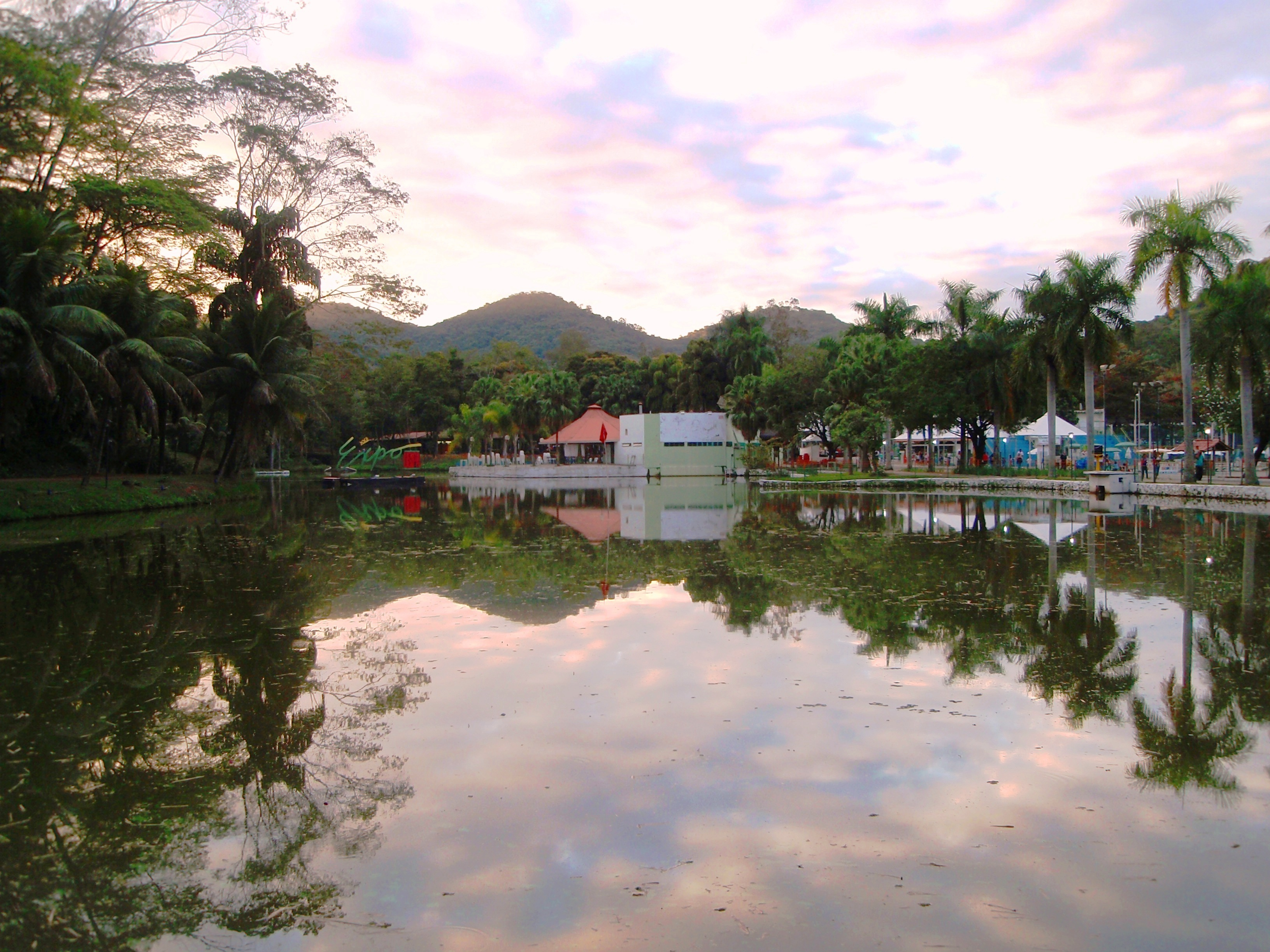
Lake at Usipa

Through the Usiminas Institute, Usiminas promotes projects and maintains spaces dedicated to the arts, such as the Usiminas Cultural Center, which serves the region with cultural workshops, a diverse theater program, an art gallery, and a library. Located next to the Vale do Aço Shopping Mall, its theater is among Brazil's most modern and received the Herity certification in 2015, recognized by UNESCO for its conservation, quality, and relevance. The Zélia Olguin Theater in the Cariru neighborhood is also managed by Instituto Usiminas. The former Grande Hotel Ipatinga building in the Castelo neighborhood was repurposed by Usiminas as the Usiminas Memory Center, inaugurated in 2021.

In addition to hosting the Usiminas Cultural Center, the Vale do Aço Shopping Mall is the region's largest leisure and entertainment facility, with its cinemas being the area's main venues. Ipatinga's cultural spaces frequently host regionally or nationally significant events, such as the Theater and Dance Popularization Campaign and the Ipatinga Live Jazz Festival. At Usipa, events such as the Xerimbabo Project (focused on environmental awareness) and the Expo Usipa (a local business exhibition) occur regularly. According to the Minas Gerais State Culture Department, the city's vibrant events, theater groups, and diverse activities make it one of the state's main cultural hubs.

=== Landmarks and attractions ===
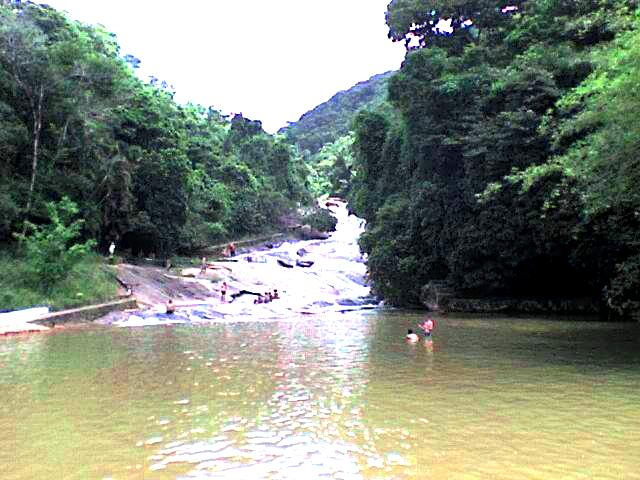
Waterfall and natural pool at the Parque das Cachoeiras

Ipatinga is part of the Atlantic Forest Tourist Circuit of Minas Gerais, established in 2010 by the Minas Gerais State Tourism Department to promote tourism in member cities. The main natural attractions include trails, forests, lagoons, and waterfalls in rural areas, some equipped with visitor infrastructure. Particularly in the environmental preservation areas and headwaters of the Ipanema stream sub-basin, there are farms, lodges, and guesthouses fostering rural tourism and ecotourism.

In rural areas, the privately managed Parque das Cachoeiras stands out, covering approximately 5 million m² with camping areas, chalets, and a restaurant. At Fazenda do Zaca, native Atlantic Forest preservation is complemented by trails and gardens open to visitors. Recognized as a private natural heritage reserve (RPPN), it hosts environmental awareness campaigns for schools and the public. At Sítio Recanto Vovô Teixeira, built in the 1930s, artisanal molasses and brown sugar are produced using a preserved sugar mill. The property also produces cornmeal with a water mill from its founding era. Empório da Serra is notable for its cheese production and wood-stove meals, available during visits.

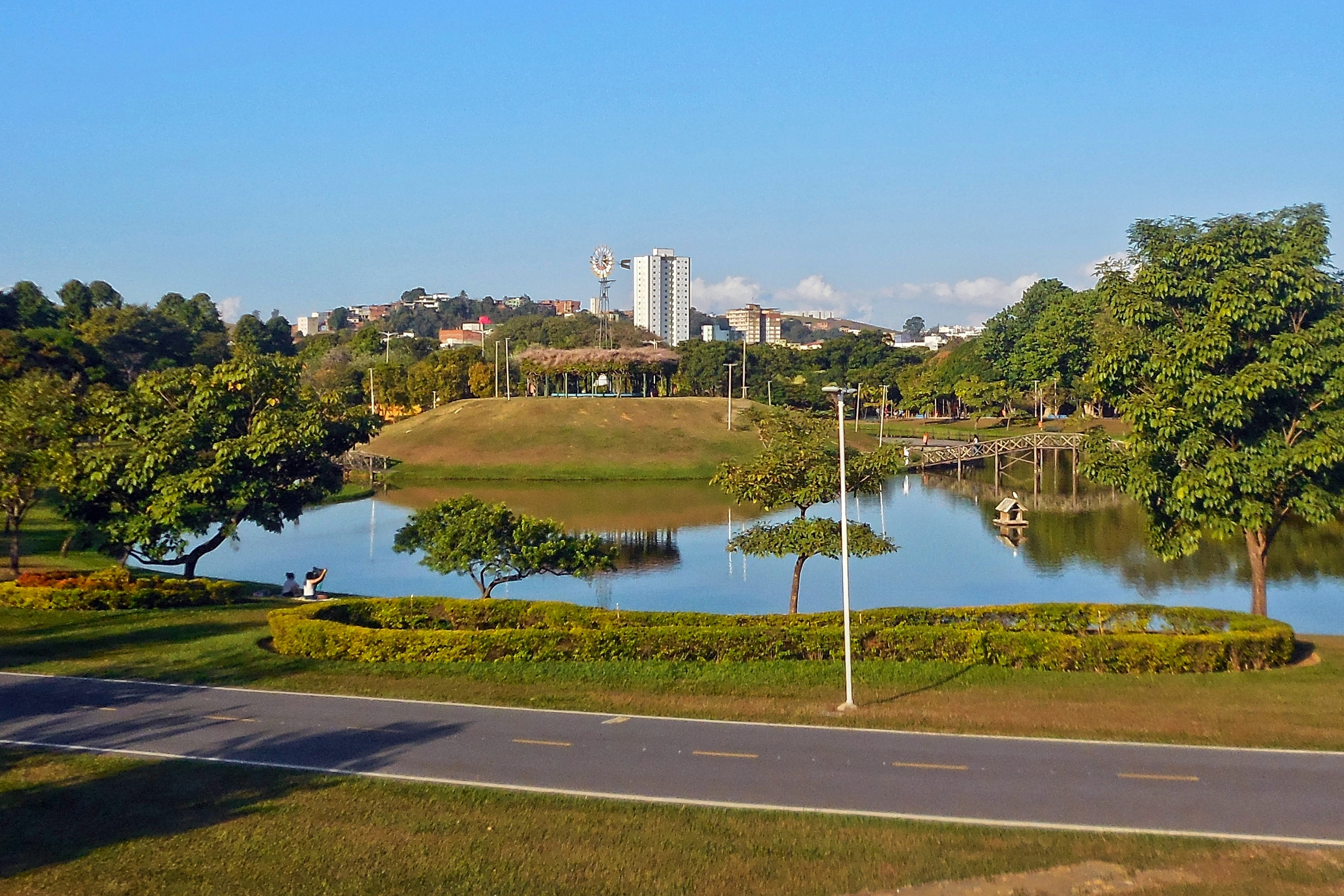
Partial view of the Ipanema Park

The urban area also features leisure facilities that attract visitors from other cities. The Ipanema Park, one of Brazil's largest urban green spaces, was one of the last projects by landscape architect Roberto Burle Marx, covering over 1 million m² with 12,000 planted trees. The park includes leisure amenities such as the Science Park, where visitors can observe or interact with physical, biological, chemical, or astronomical phenomena, as well as a playground, sports courts, soccer fields, walking trails, bike lanes, and an amphitheater. Its surroundings include the Municipal Nursery, the Emerson Fittipaldi Kart Track, the Sete de Outubro Sports and Cultural Center, and the João Lamego Netto Municipal Stadium (Ipatingão). The Caminho das Águas Railway, spanning 2.6 km, connects Ipanema Park to the Pouso de Água Limpa Station, a small tourist train station.

Usipa, in addition to its Biodiversity Center with a mini zoo garden and botanical garden, offers ecological trails, a water park, sports areas, snack bars, and children's leisure spaces. The Vale do Aço Shopping Mall, as previously noted, is the largest shopping center in eastern Minas Gerais and among the largest in the state's interior, serving as the primary metropolitan leisure and entertainment hub. In the Cariru neighborhood, the restored ruins of the Pedra Mole Station have been open to visitors since 2019, featuring a trail with informational signs, the station's remnants, and a lookout point for viewing the confluence of the Piracicaba and Doce rivers.

=== Sports ===
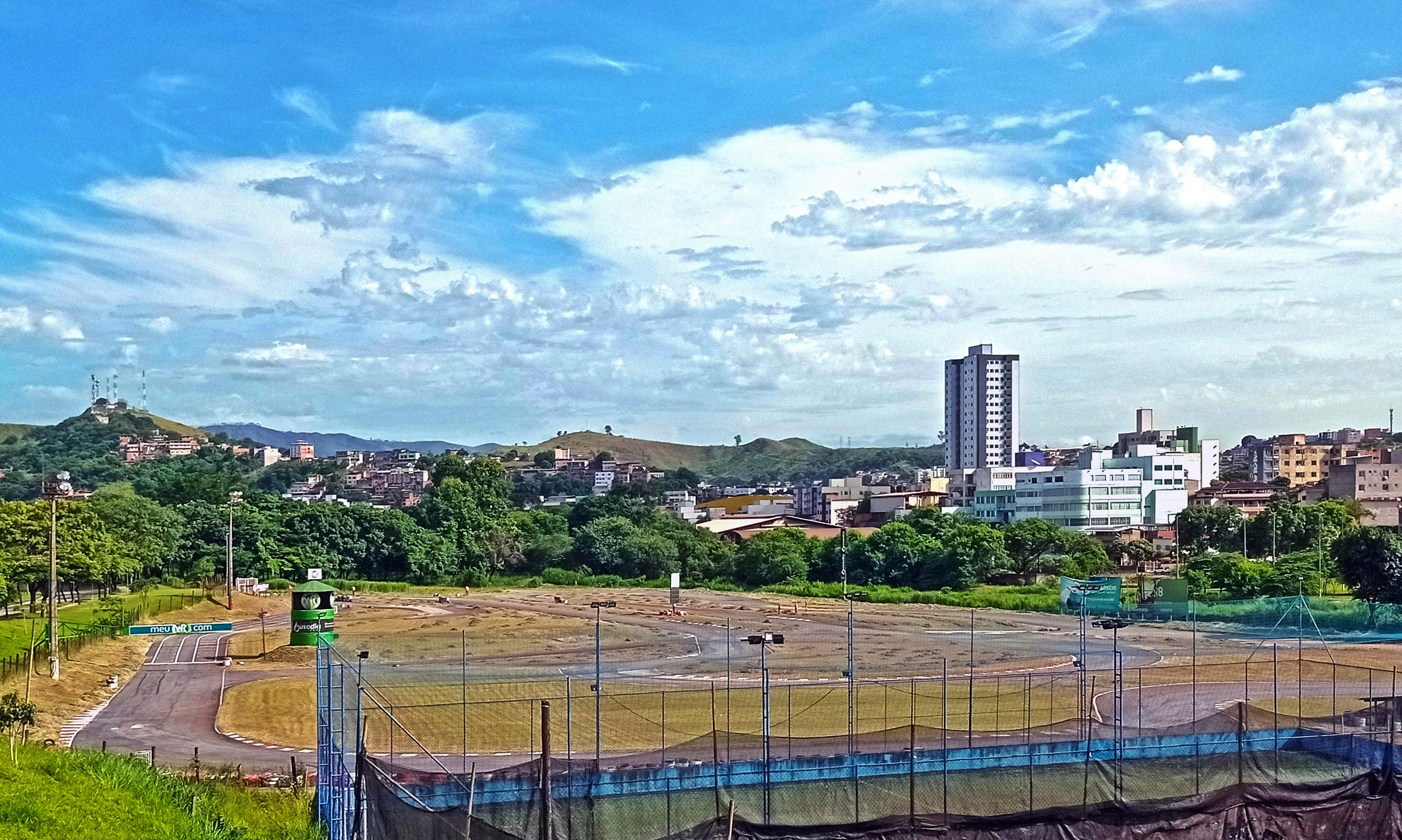
View of the Emerson Fittipaldi Kart Track

Ipatinga offers numerous spaces and facilities for sports activities. The Usipa Sports and Recreation Association is notable, featuring a heated Olympic-size swimming pool, a soccer stadium, sports courts, a covered gymnasium, an athletics track, and children's leisure areas. The institution also trains athletes in specialized sports and soccer. Some of its most notable athletes include judoka Edilene Andrade, runner Lucimar Aparecida de Moura, swimmer Flávia Delaroli, and soccer players Somália and Edivaldo.

The Sete de Outubro Sports and Cultural Center in the Veneza neighborhood provides social projects in sports and culture, with courts suitable for basketball, futsal, handball, and karate, as well as soccer fields. The Emerson Fittipaldi Kart Track (Ipatinga Kart Club), opened in 1982, occasionally hosts state or national kart racing competitions. The Ipatinga School Games (JEI), organized by the municipality with support from the State Sports Incentive Law, annually bring together students from public and private schools competing in sports such as athletics, basketball, handball, volleyball, and chess. The same law applies to the organisation of other sporting events in the municipality, including those organised by the private sector.

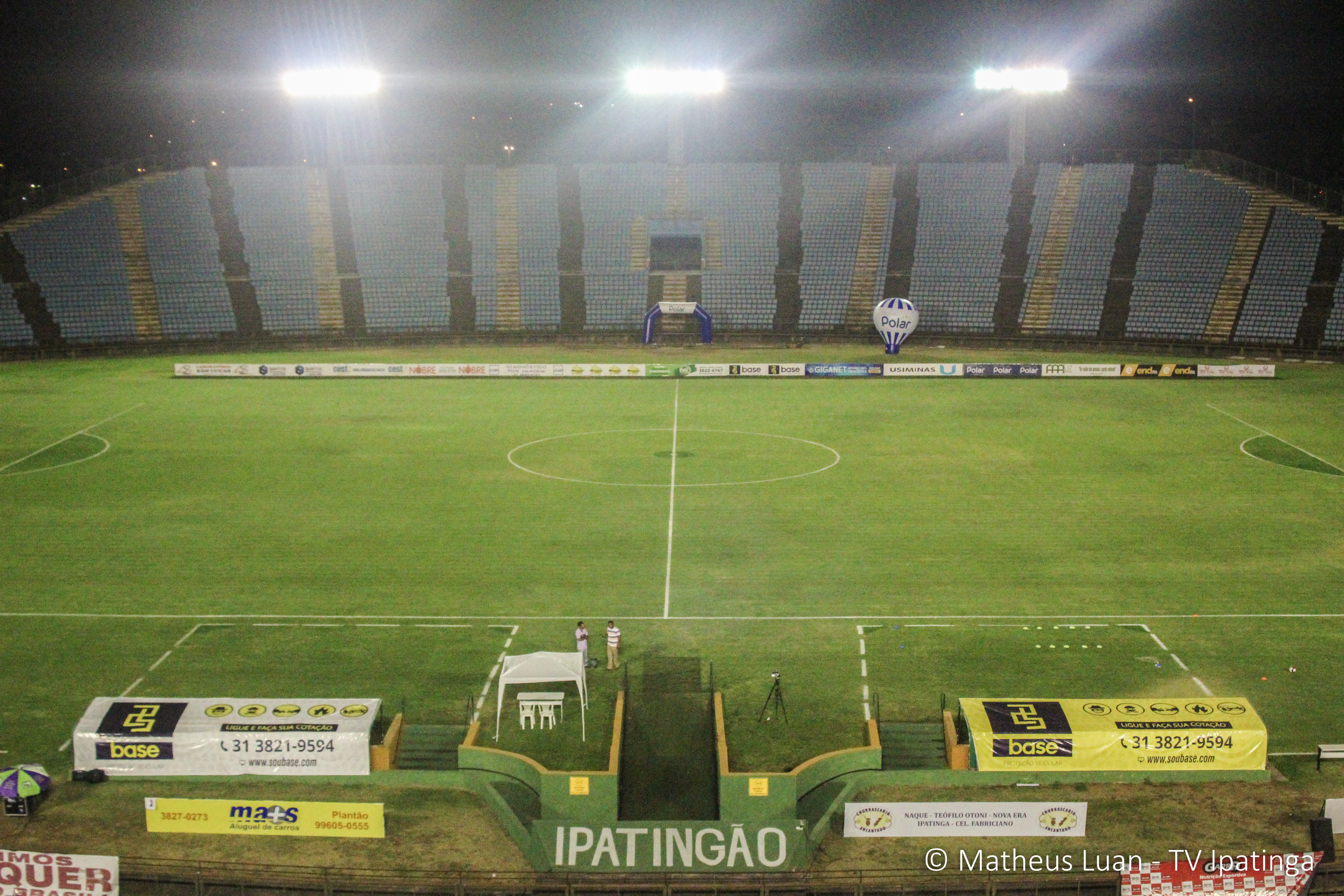
Interior view of the Ipatingão at night

The João Lamego Netto Municipal Stadium is the main stadium in Ipatinga and the Vale do Aço, with a capacity of up to 23,000 people. Known as Ipatingão, it is the home of Ipatinga Futebol Clube, the region's most successful soccer team, with participation in the top divisions of the Brazilian Football Championship and Minas Gerais Football Championship. In 2010, during the renovation of the Governador Magalhães Pinto Stadium (Mineirão) in Belo Horizonte for the 2014 FIFA World Cup, Ipatingão hosted matches for major Belo Horizonte teams (Cruzeiro and Atlético). The Amaro Lanari Júnior Stadium, known as Usipa's stadium, opened on 7 September 1961, and its training center has been used by elite national and international clubs, including Atlético Mineiro, São Paulo, and San Lorenzo.

Another team from the city that gained prominence is Ideal Futebol Clube, which competed in the lower divisions of the Campeonato Mineiro and developed players for elite clubs. The João Teotônio Ferreira Stadium (Ferreirão), owned by the municipality but managed by Ideal, has a capacity of approximately 3,000 people and has been used for matches in the lower divisions of the Campeonato Mineiro and for local amateur club derbies. The Novo Esporte Clube Ipatinga, established in 2012, participated in the second division of the 2013 Campeonato Mineiro but was eliminated in the first phase. The Ipatinga Sports League oversees the municipality’s amateur football competitions across all age categories, which in some years involve more than 10,000 athletes.

=== Holidays and symbols ===
In Ipatinga, there are three municipal holidays and eight national holidays, in addition to optional holidays. The municipal holidays are the city’s anniversary, celebrated on 29 April; Corpus Christi, which in 2025 is observed on 19 June; and the Assumption of Our Lady, on 15 August.

The municipality also has official symbols, namely the flag and the coat of arms. The flag consists of the municipal coat of arms centered on a rectangle with blue, red, and green colors, which are the city’s official colors. The coat of arms was established by Law No. 88 of 6 September 1967 and amended by Law No. 2,541 of 4 June 2009. It features a crown symbolizing strength and authority, with a star representing Barra Alegre, the municipality’s only district. Below, a steel ladle in the shape of a shield symbolizes the steel industry, surrounded by two branches representing the laurels of victory. At the center of the emblem is a globe with two stylized human figures, symbolizing the unity of peoples and technology, and a ribbon bearing the motto "Trust, Work, and Progress."

== Sister cities ==
Ipatinga currently has two sister cities:

- – Kitakyushu, Fukuoka, Japan since 24 July 1978

== Notable people ==
- Alberto Valerio (born 1985), racing driver

== See also ==
- List of municipalities in Minas Gerais
- Ipatinga massacre
- Ipanema Park
