= Ipanema Park =

Brazilian urban park

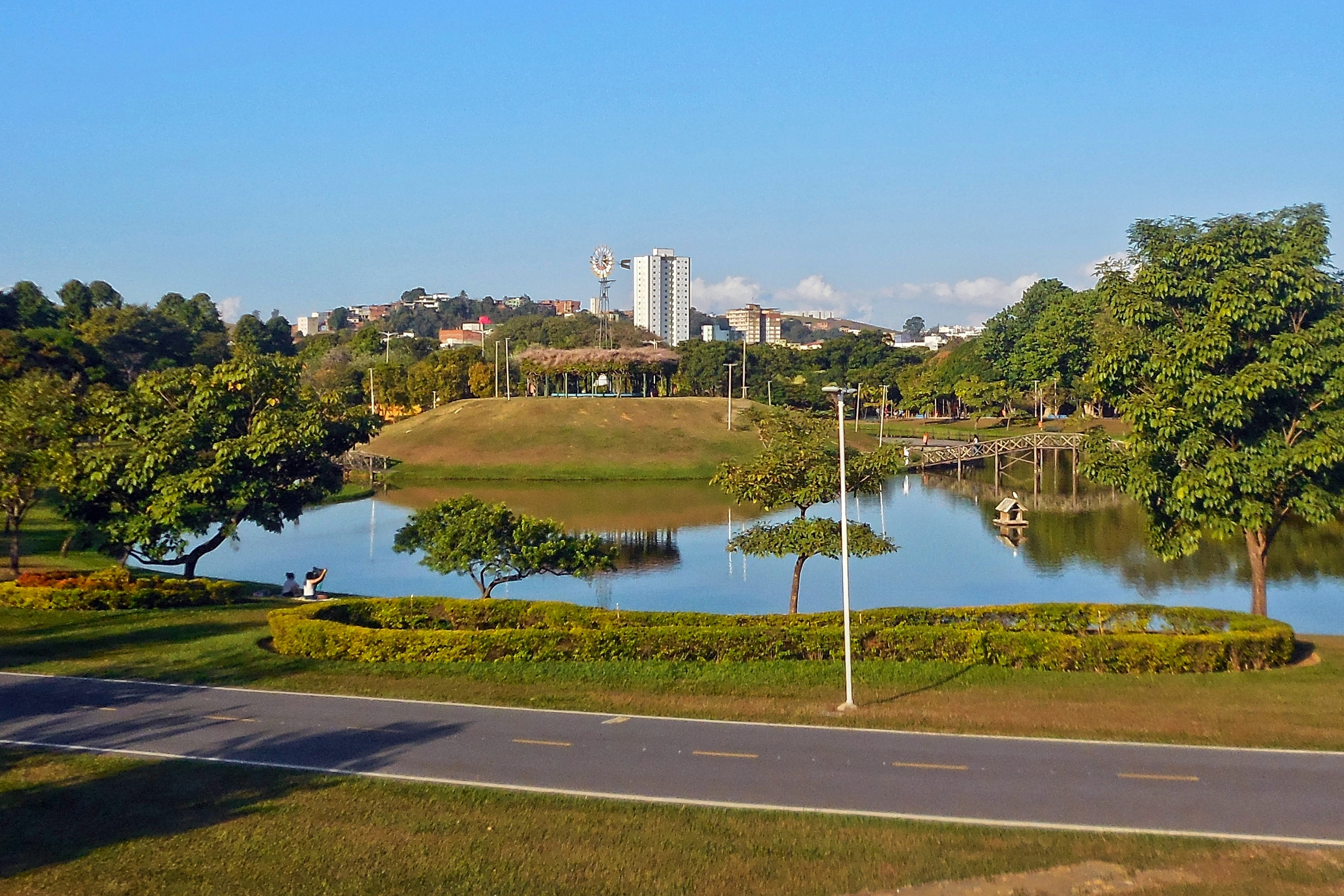
- Partial view of Ipanema Park
- Interactive map of Ipanema Park
- Type: Urban park
- Location: Minas Gerais; Brazil
- Coordinates: 19°28′16″S 42°32′21″W
- Area: 1.1km²
- Opening: Starting in 1990
- Designer: Roberto Burle Marx
- Administrator: Ipatinga City Hall

Ipanema Park (Portuguese: Parque Ipanema) is an urban park located in the Brazilian city of Ipatinga, in the state of Minas Gerais. It is located between the neighborhoods Iguaçu, Jardim Panorama, Veneza, Centro and Novo Cruzeiro and its area is estimated to be 1.1 km², within which about 12 thousand trees were planted, being considered one of the largest green areas in the country located within an urban perimeter.

It was designed with the initial goal of preserving the margin of the Ipanema stream, being one of the last projects of landscape designer Roberto Burle Marx, who was hired in 1985. The inauguration, however, occurred gradually during the 1990's, as the areas used for its expansion were properly expropriated. Its administration is the responsibility of the Ipatinga City Hall, and it was declared a municipal cultural heritage site in 2000.

The interior of the park houses a playground for children, the Science Park, multi-sports courts, soccer fields, walking trails, bike paths and an amphitheater. Its complex, however, includes remaining equipment such as the Caminho das Águas Railroad, with its 2.6 km extension; the Municipal Plant Nursery; the Emerson Fittipaldi International Karting Track (Kart Club Ipatinga); and the João Lamego Netto Municipal Stadium (Ipatingão).

== History ==
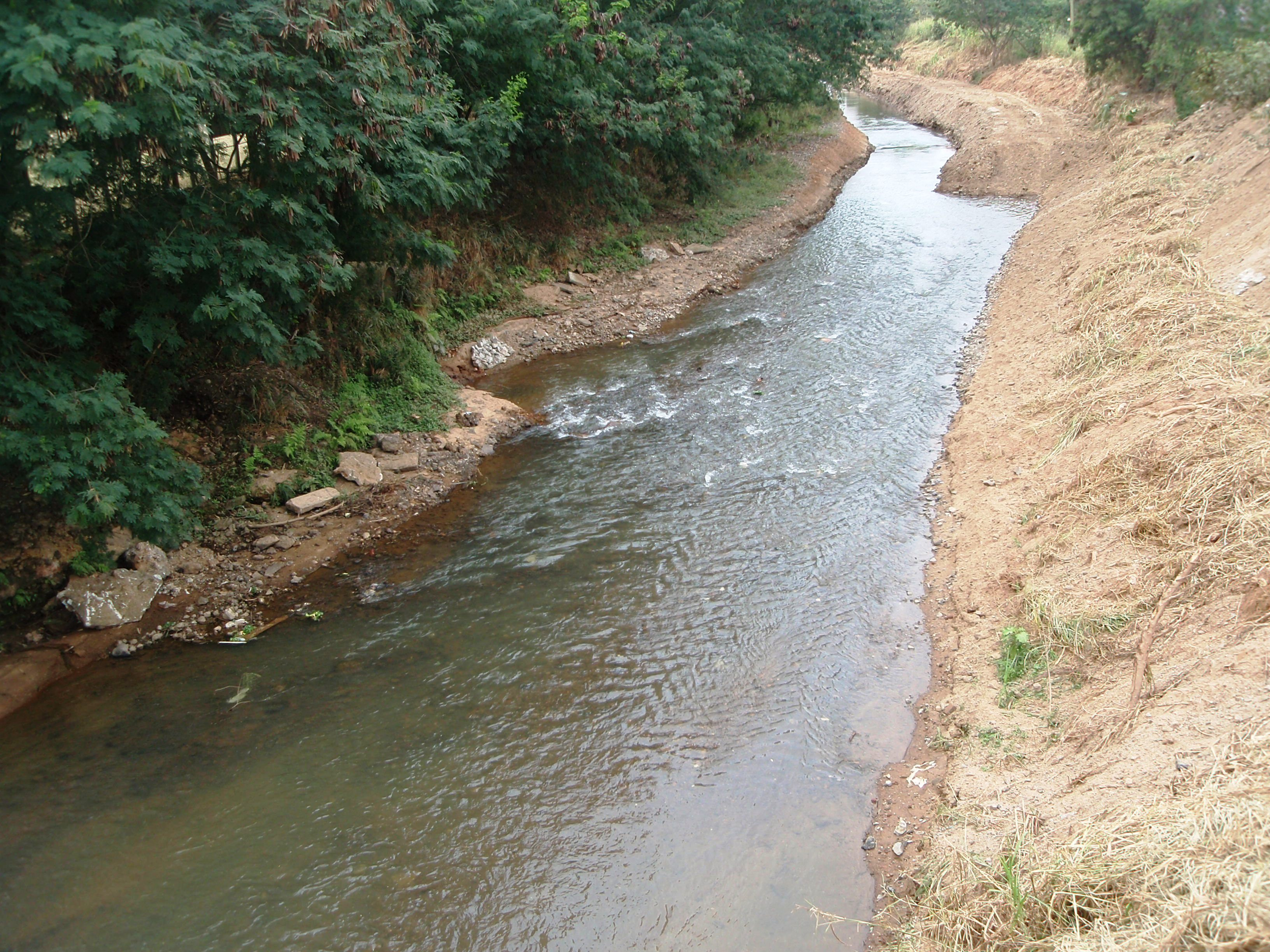
View of the Ipanema stream, in Ipatinga, Minas Gerais, Brazil.

The planning of the current Ipanema Park began in the 1970s, when the public administration and Usiminas had the goal of developing an urban park bordering the Ipanema stream that would originally be called Vale Verde (Green Valley). Allied to this, there was a demand from the population for the construction of leisure areas in the city. The selected area had not yet been occupied and was owned by Usiminas, being located in the middle of the neighborhoods Iguaçu, Jardim Panorama, Veneza, Centro and Novo Cruzeiro, which would facilitate access to a large part of the population.

The work began in 1980, with the earthworks, drainage, treatment of the banks of the Ipanema stream, planting grass, afforestation and location of internal roads and the current Roberto Burle Marx Avenue, which gives access to the park. After the works were paralyzed for some years, Roberto Burle Marx was hired in 1985 to idealize the landscaping project. Part of the originally planted arborization was depredated during the time the construction was abandoned, which made replanting necessary. The inauguration of the park occurred slowly in the following years and decades due to problems with the expropriation of surrounding areas, where continuations of the park should be implanted, some of which were only consolidated in the 2000s.

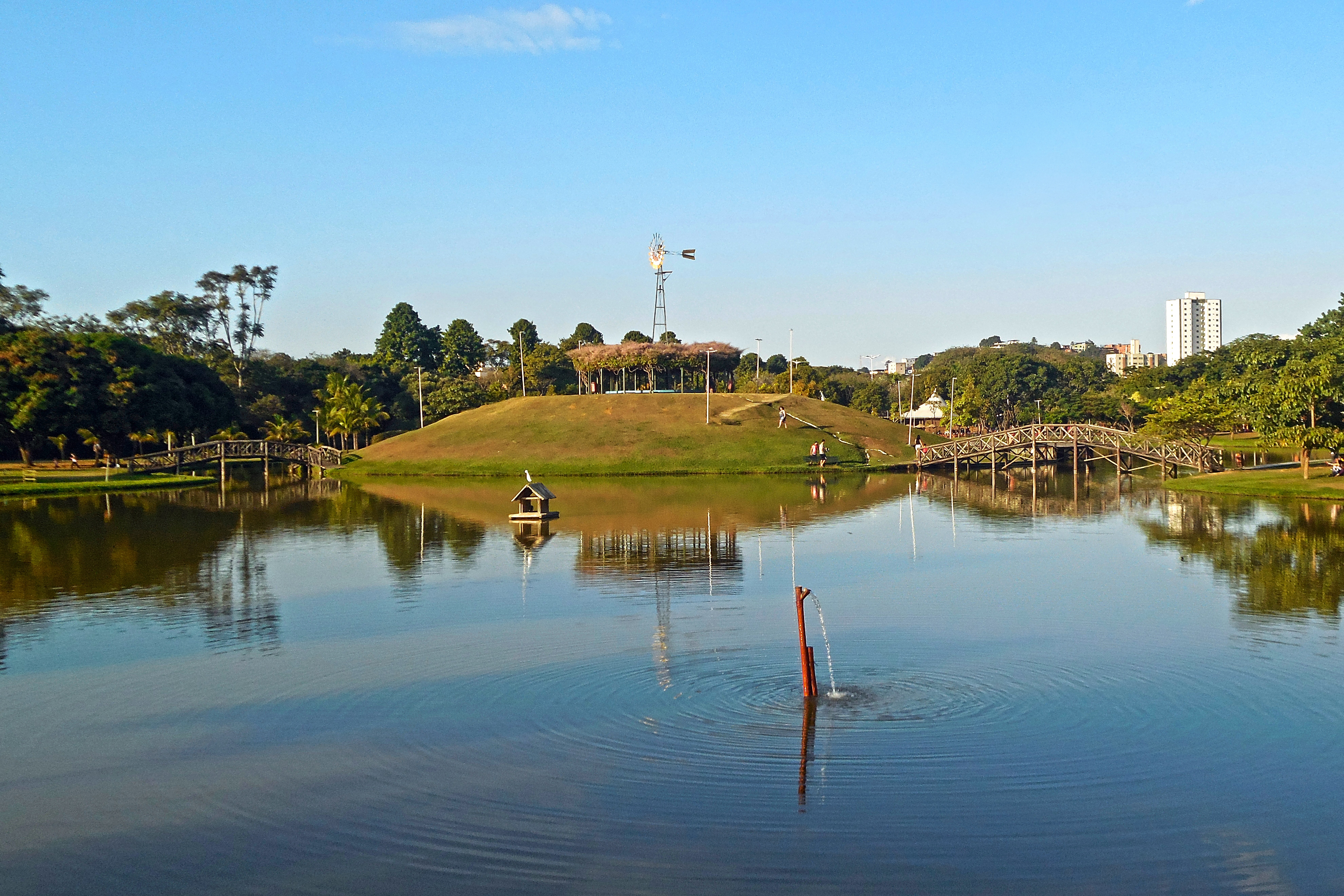
Lake of the Ipanema Park.

Integrated to the park, in the same region, were built the Municipal Plant Nursery, concluded in 1981; the Emerson Fittipaldi Karting Track, inaugurated on October 20, 1982; the João Lamego Netto Municipal Stadium (formerly the Epaminondas Mendes Brito Municipal Stadium), the Ipatingão, inaugurated on November 23, 1982; and the Sete de Outubro Sports and Cultural Center, inaugurated in 1991. There was also the inauguration of the Caminho das Águas Railroad on June 12, 1999, and the Science Park on July 29, 2000. The railroad, used for rides between the park and the Pouso de Água Limpa Station, as well as the Science Park, are occasionally deactivated.

In November 2018, the premises of informal traders located along Roberto Burle Marx Avenue around Ipanema Park were removed. The food and craft stalls had been present since the park's opening, but the removal was ordered by the city administration on the grounds that they compromised the landscape and the environment. Furthermore, the park is a cultural heritage site, which requires environmental preservation, and the installations were considered illegal. On the other hand, the eviction occurred without the traders, in a total of 49 stalls, receiving any immediate compensation. On October 26, 2019, six food kiosks were inaugurated inside the green area, each with 386 m², distributed in three modules.

== Structure and attractions ==
=== Park Area ===
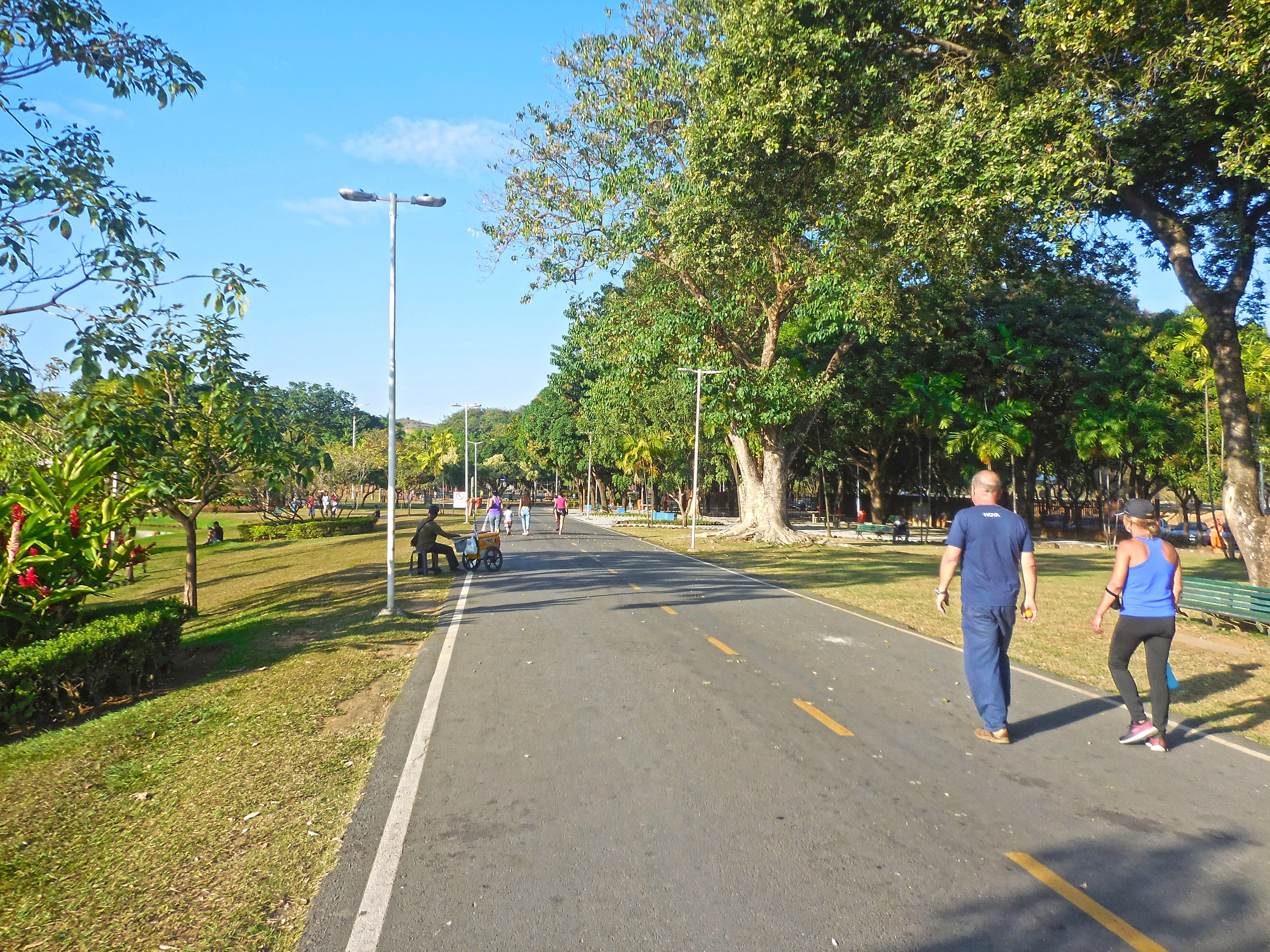
Walking path of the Ipanema Park.

Ipanema Park is a municipal park, managed by the Ipatinga City Hall. According to information from 2013, there were about 12,000 trees planted in its total area of 1 million m², which contribute to the park being appointed as the largest urban green area in Minas Gerais and one of the largest in the country. In the same year there were approximately 60 species of trees and plants, especially pink trumpet tree, palm tree and fruit trees.

In the middle of the garden spaces and the demarcated paths, there is an artificial lake of 9,347 m² parallel to the course of the Ipanema stream, with a small raised island in its center where a weather vane stands, which can be accessed via two wooden walkways. Around the lake are the food kiosks, inaugurated in 2019. In the same year, as part of the celebrations of the 55th anniversary of the city, on April 29, the sign "Eu Amo Ipatinga" (English: I Love Ipatinga) was inaugurated. The structure is made of steel, 5.5 meters wide by three meters high, and was given as a gift by São Francisco Xavier Foundation (FSFX) and Usiminas.

The walking and biking paths that intercede the park allow direct access to nearby neighborhoods, such as Canaã and Iguaçu. Besides the lake, there are soccer fields, courts, an amphitheater and a playground for children inside the park. Next to the leisure area is the Science Park, where physical, biological, chemical and astronomical phenomena can be observed or interacted with by the visitor. In the same space as the Science Park and the playground are also the "whispering corner", the "path of the stars", the "water cloud" and the sundial.

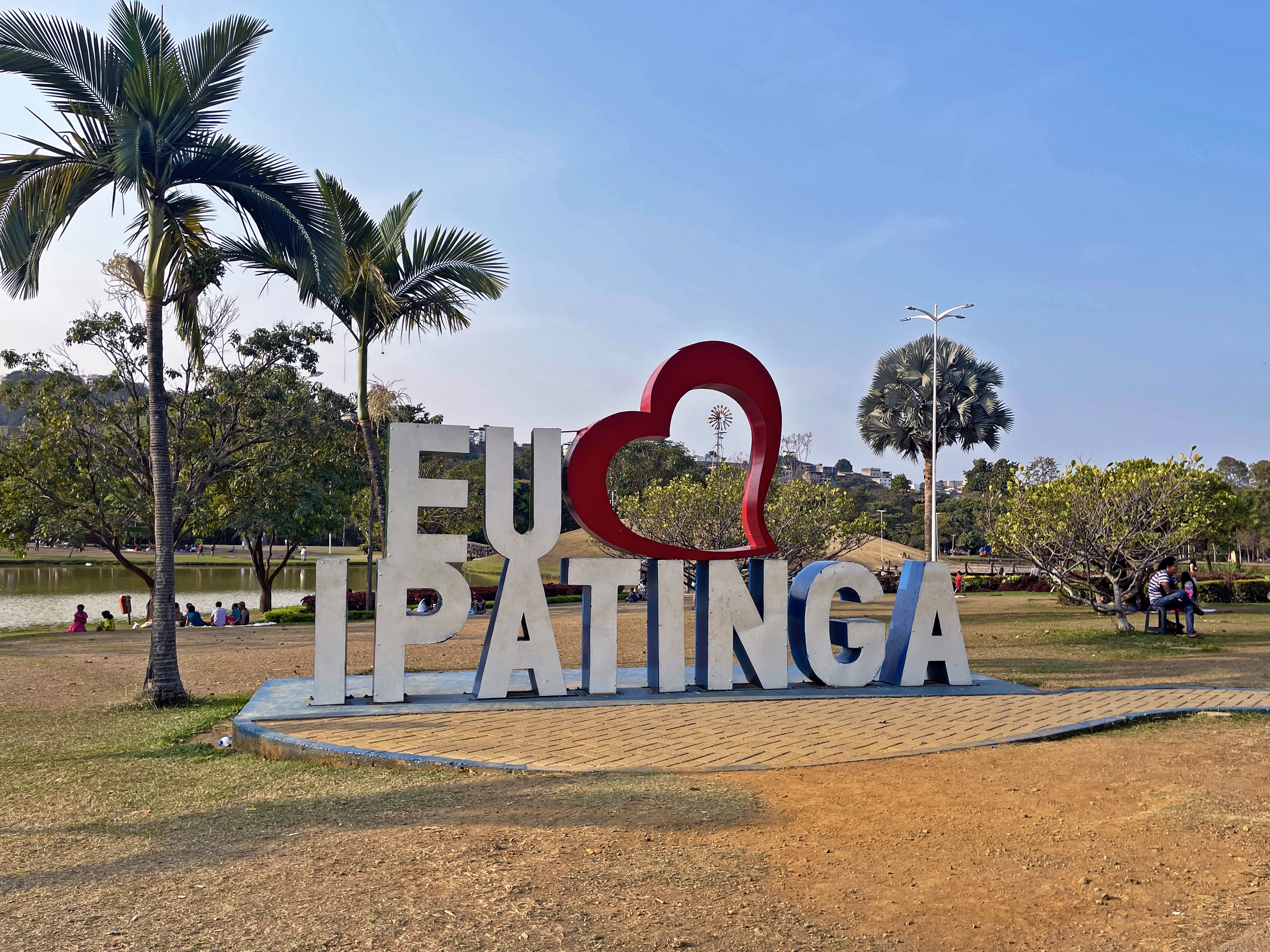
"Eu Amo Ipatinga" sign, inaugurated in 2019

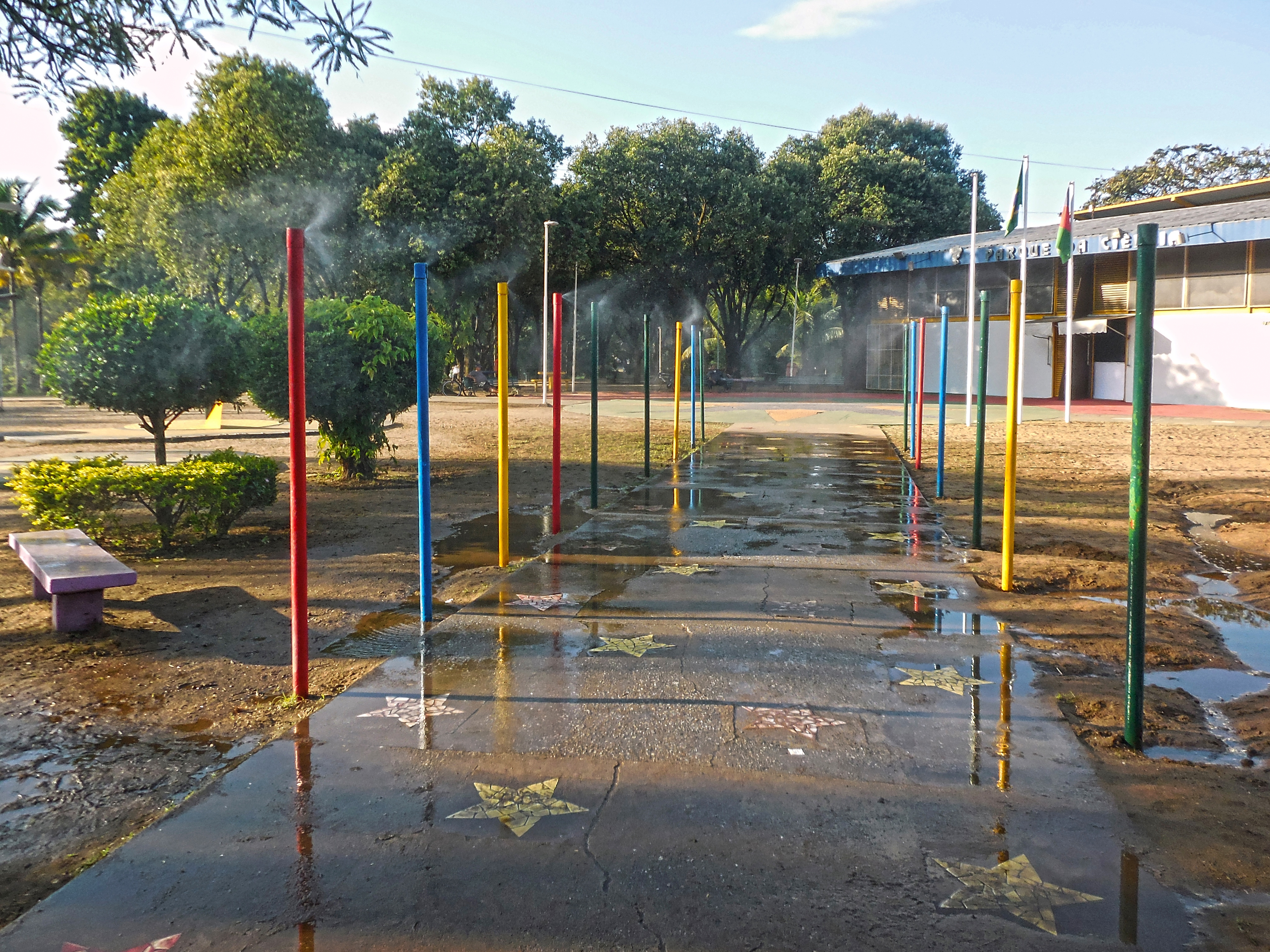
Water cloud and star path

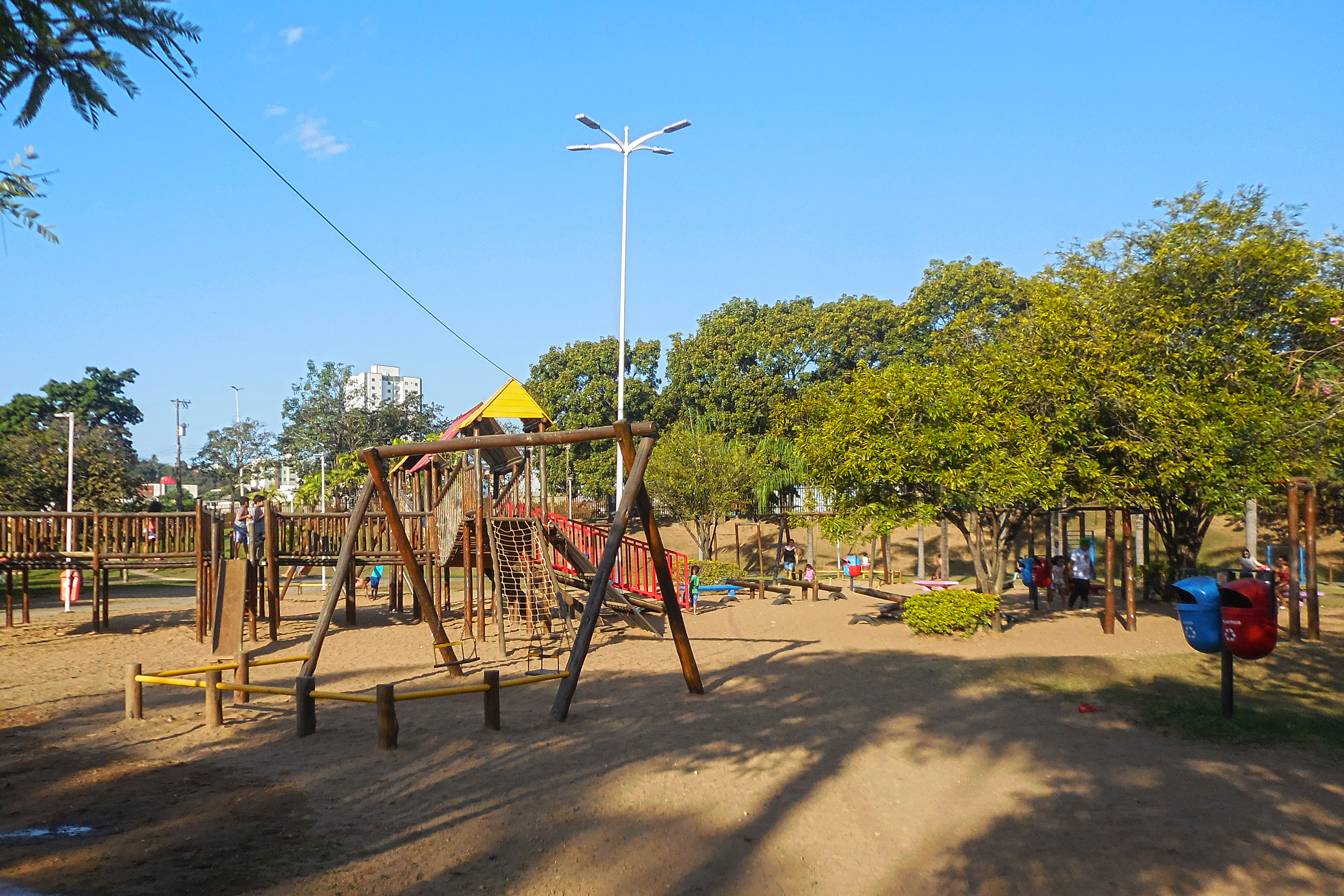
View of the children's playground

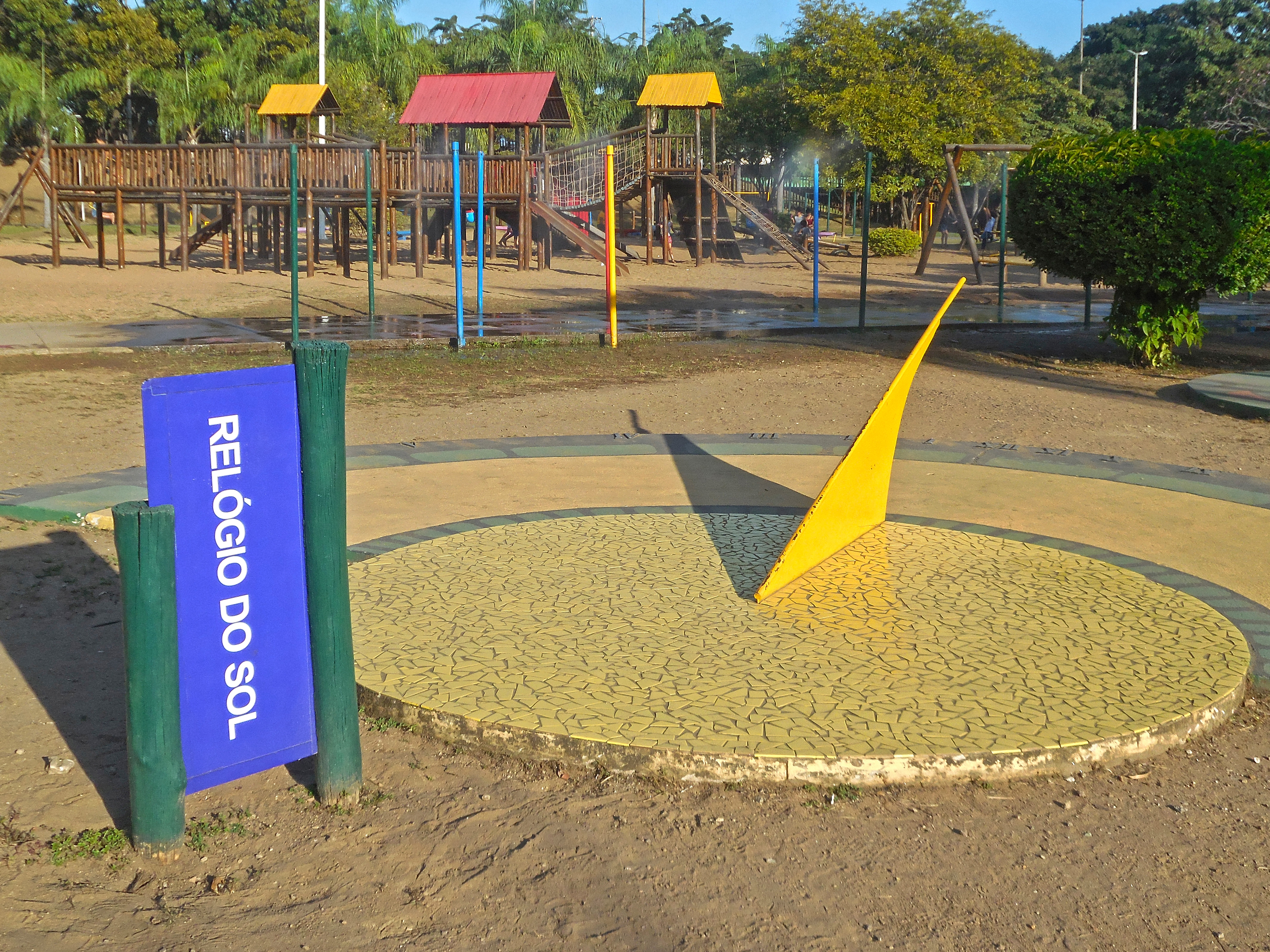
Ipanema Park Sundial

=== Integrated Equipment ===
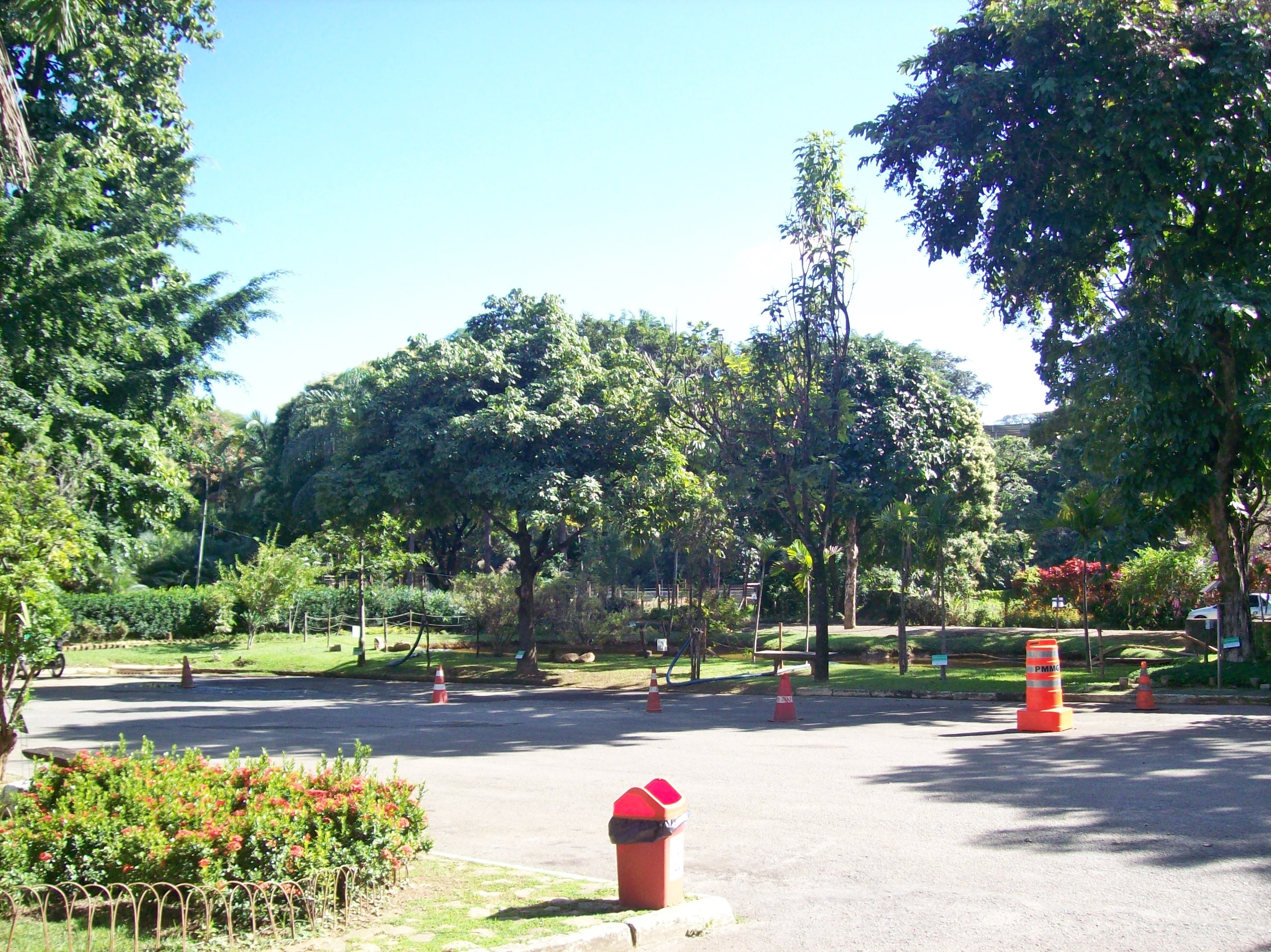
Interior of the municipal plant nursery of Ipatinga, Minas Gerais, Brazil.

The Emerson Fittipaldi International Karting Track, with its 1,200-meter long track, occasionally hosts state or national stages of karting competitions. In 1985, during one round of the Brazilian Karting Championship, it was attended by 40,000 people in its stands and on the grass field. In 2004, it underwent renovations to meet the requirements of the Brazilian Automobile Confederation (CBA), the International Automobile Federation (FIA), and the Automobilism Federation of Minas Gerais (FMA), when it received the title of "international kart track". The Kart Club of Ipatinga, which exists on the site, is maintained by volunteers.

The Caminho das Águas Railroad has a steam locomotive that pulled two passenger cars between the park and the Pouso de Água Limpa Station, on a 2.6 kilometer tour along the right bank of the Ipanema stream. This steam locomotive originated in Germany in 1937 and is powered by wood fuel and sugar cane bagasse. The line is now deactivated, but was expected to be back in operation as of June 2021.

Among the other facilities that are integrated to the Ipanema Park complex are the Sete de Outubro Sports and Cultural Center, which has multi-sports courts and soccer fields; the Municipal Plant Nursery, where fruit, ornamental, tree, and medicinal seedlings are grown or that can be acquired by the population; the João Lamego Netto Municipal Stadium, which is the city's and the Vale do Aço metropolitan area's main stadium and can hold up to 23,000 people.

== Culture and adversity ==
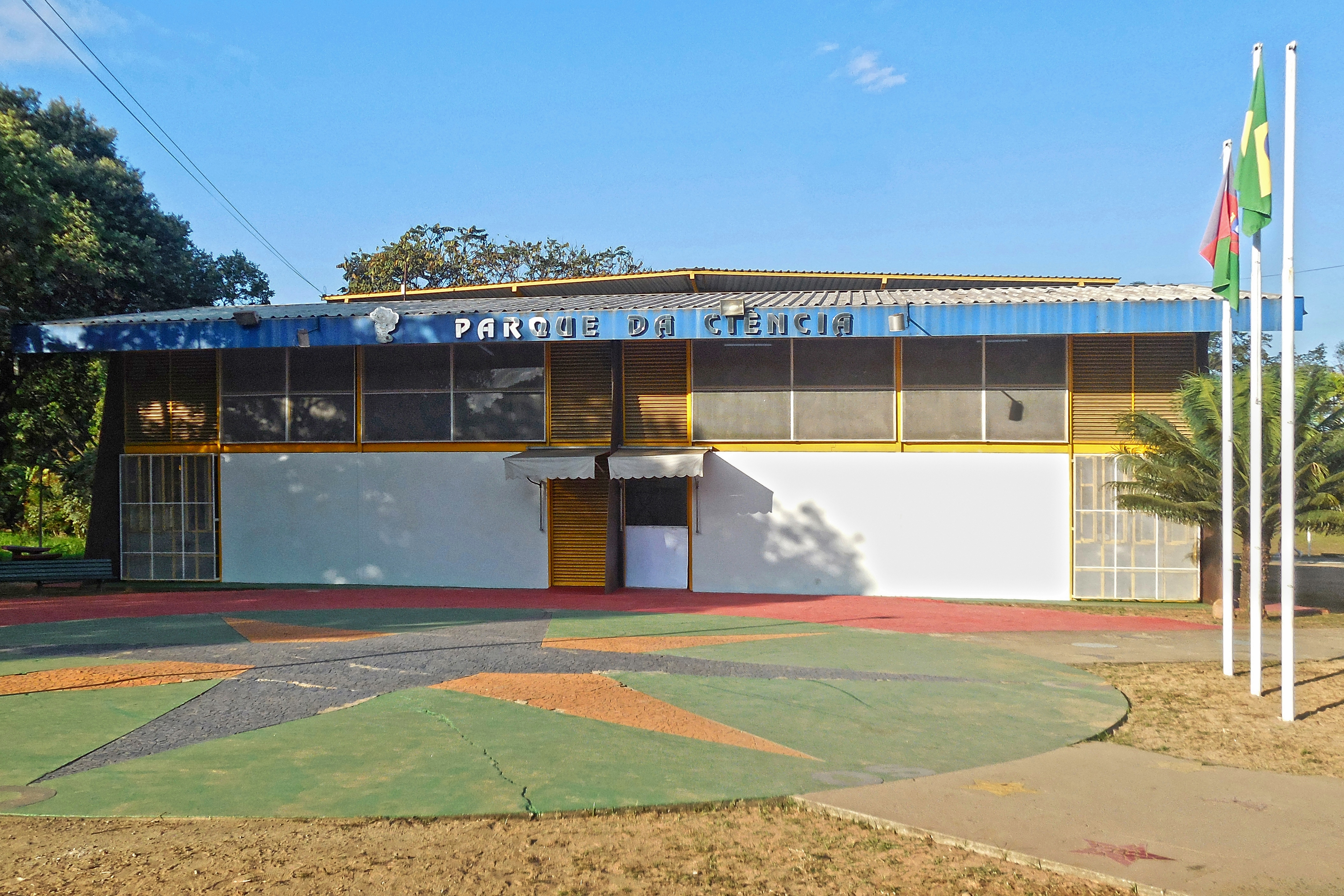
Facade of the "Parque da Ciência" (Science Park).

The park occasionally hosts events that demand a larger audience expectation, which has already reached the 85 thousand people mark in a Rick & Renner concert in 2009. Some editions of New Year's Eve; the staging of the Passion of Jesus, during Holy Week; the city's anniversary festivities, which is celebrated on April 29; as well as various musical and cultural shows. On specific dates the Ipanema Park lake is open for collective fishing.

In the run-up to Christmas there is special decoration and Santa's house is opened, where a nativity scene is displayed, and Christmas cantatas are organized in some years. The Science Park is occasionally open for science and astronomy exhibits and receives visits organized by schools in the region, but its activities are temporarily shut down on some occasions. In 2002, it received the III Scientific Dissemination Award "Francisco de Assis Magalhães Gomes", for its relevance at state level, and was enrolled in the Brazilian Association of Science Centers and Museums (ABCMC).

The Pouso de Água Limpa Station was declared a municipal cultural heritage by Law No. 1727 of November 4, 1999, and the entire Ipanema Park was declared a national heritage by Law No. 1763 of March 24, 2000. Despite the maintenance carried out by the City Hall, graffiti, damaged or even burned garbage cans and broken lamp posts are some of the problems that can occasionally be found in Ipanema Park. Drug dealing and assaults against park goers have also become frequent, including murders. Bicycle traffic inside the park is pointed out as a problem by some users, since it hinders the circulation of people walking and has been responsible for causing pedestrian accidents.

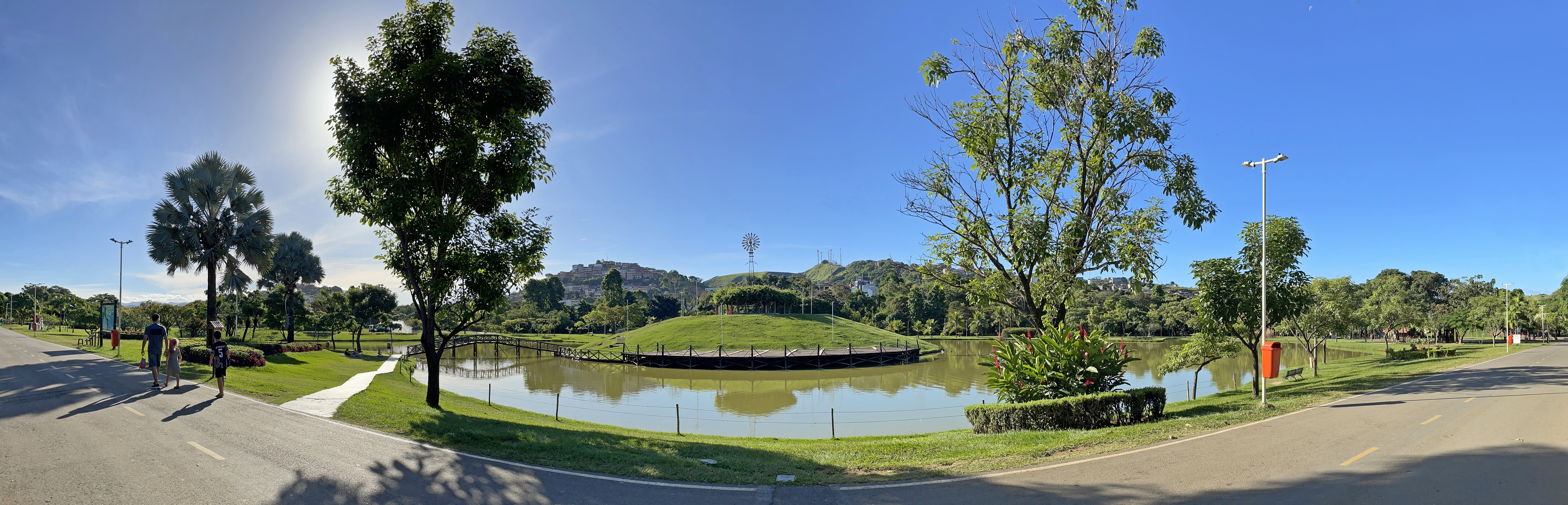
Panoramic view of the Ipanema park.
