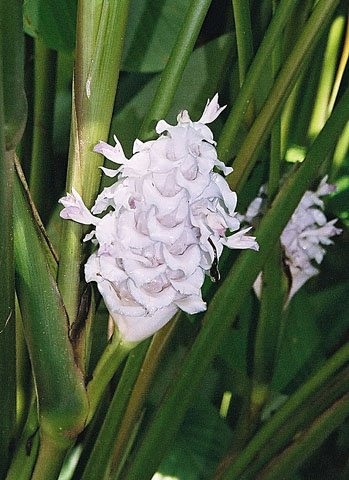

Scientific classification
- Kingdom: Plantae
- Clade: Embryophytes
- Clade: Tracheophytes
- Clade: Spermatophytes
- Clade: Angiosperms
- Clade: Monocots
- Clade: Commelinids
- Order: Zingiberales
- Family: Marantaceae
- Genus: Goeppertia
- Species: G. burle-marxii

Binomial name
- Goeppertia burle-marxii (H.Kenn.) Borchs. & S.Suárez

Synonyms
- Calathea burle-marxii

= Goeppertia burle-marxii =

Species of plant

Goeppertia burle-marxii is a species of plant in the Marantaceae family native to Brazil. It is named after Roberto Burle Marx. Common names for Goeppertia burle-marxii include "Blue Ice Calathea" and "White Ice Calathea".

Goeppertia burle-marxii is closely related to Goeppertia cylindrica, and may be confused with it when not flowering.
