= Roberto Burle Marx =

Brazilian landscape architect (1909–1994)

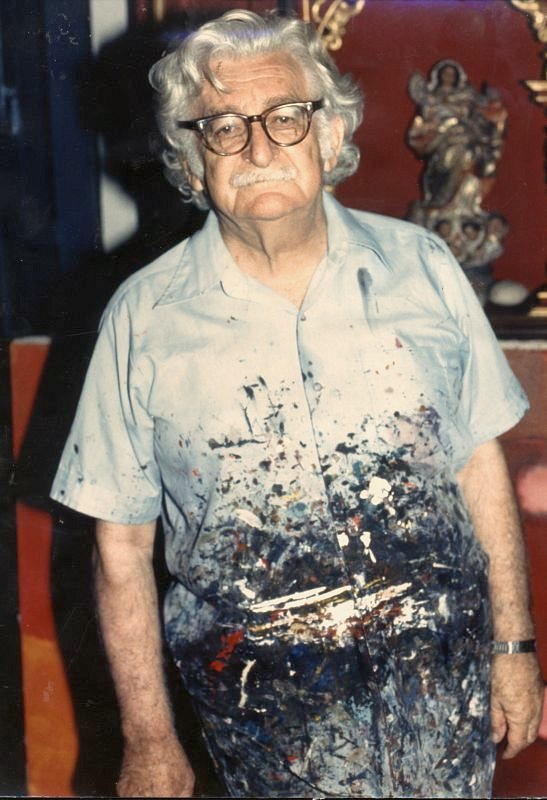
- Marx in 1981
- Born: August 4, 1909; São Paulo, Brazil
- Died: June 4, 1994 (aged 84); Rio de Janeiro, Brazil
- Occupation: Landscape architect
- Known for: Designing gardens and public spaces
- Parent(s): Rebecca Cecília Burle; Wilhelm Marx
- Awards: Awards

Roberto Burle Marx (August 4, 1909 – June 4, 1994) was a Brazilian landscape architect (as well as a painter, print maker, ecologist, naturalist, artist and musician) whose designs of parks and gardens made him world-famous. He is credited with having introduced modernist landscape architecture to Brazil. He was known as a modern nature artist and a public urban space designer. His work had a great influence on tropical garden design in the 20th century. Water gardens were a popular theme in his work. He was deftly able to transfer traditional artistic expressions such as graphic design, tapestry and folk art into his landscape designs. He also designed fabrics, jewellery and stage sets.

He was one of the first people to call for the conservation of Brazil's rainforests. More than 50 plants bear his name. He amassed a substantial collection of plants at his home, including more than 500 philodendrons, including some that were discovered by him or bear his name, like Philodendron burle-marxii.

== Early life ==
Roberto Burle Marx was born in São Paulo. He was the fourth son of Rebecca Cecília Burle, a member of the traditional Pernambuco-based family of French ancestry, Burle Dubeux, and Wilhelm Marx, a German Jew born in Stuttgart and raised in Trier. The family moved to Rio de Janeiro in 1913.

Burle Marx's first landscaping inspirations came while studying painting in Germany, where he often visited the Botanical Garden in Berlin and first learned about Brazil's native flora. Upon returning to Brazil in 1930, he began collecting plants in and around his home. He went to school at the National School of Fine Arts in Rio in 1930 where he focused on visual arts under Leo Putz and Candido Portinari. While in school he associated with several of Brazil's future leaders in architecture and botanists who continued to be of significant influence in his personal and professional life. One of these was his professor, Brazilian Modernism's Lucio Costa, the architect and planner who lived down the street from Burle.

== Career ==
Sítio Roberto Burle Marx
UNESCO World Heritage Site
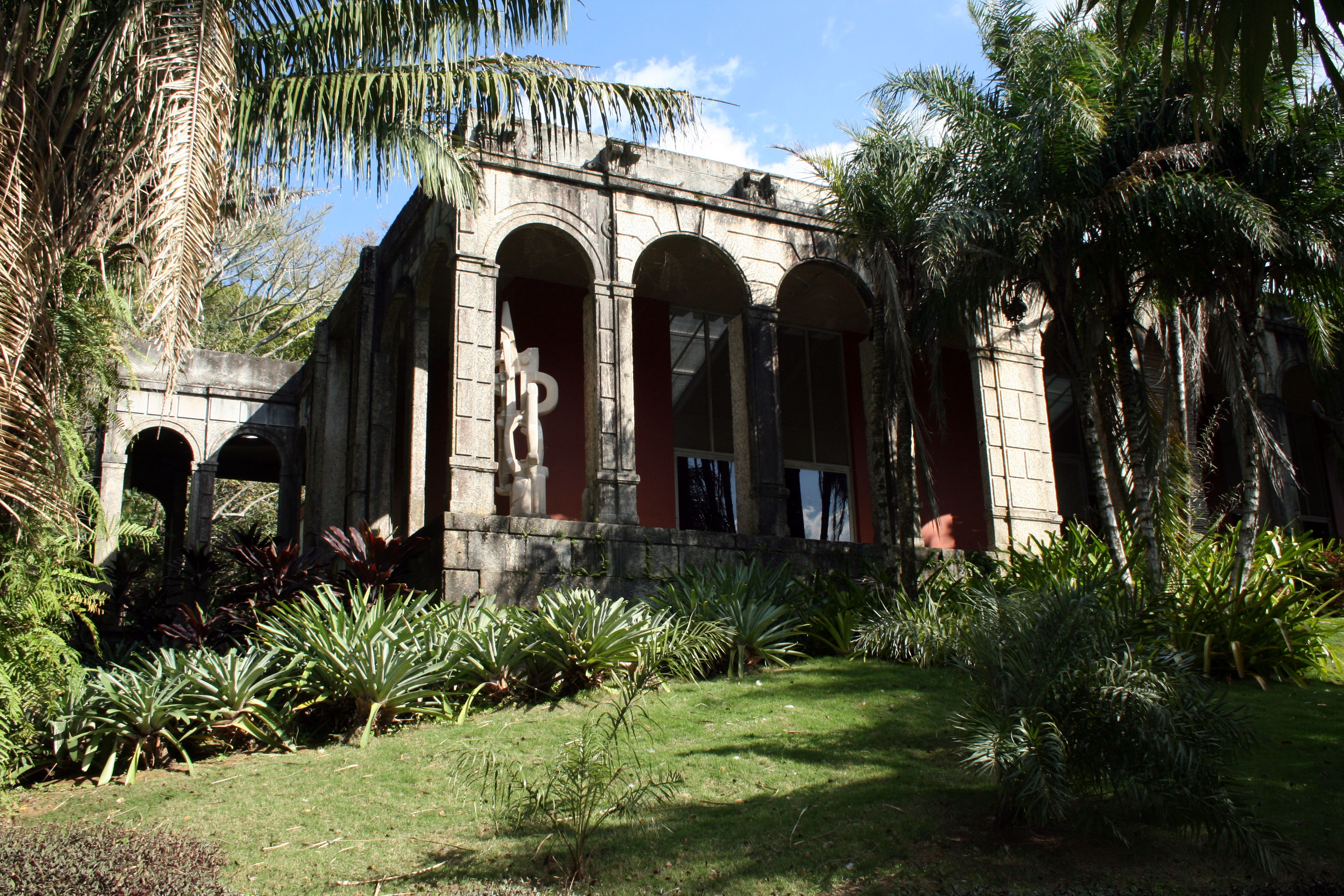
- Location: Brazil
- Criteria: Cultural: (ii)(iv)
- Reference: 1620
- Inscription: 2021 (44th Session)

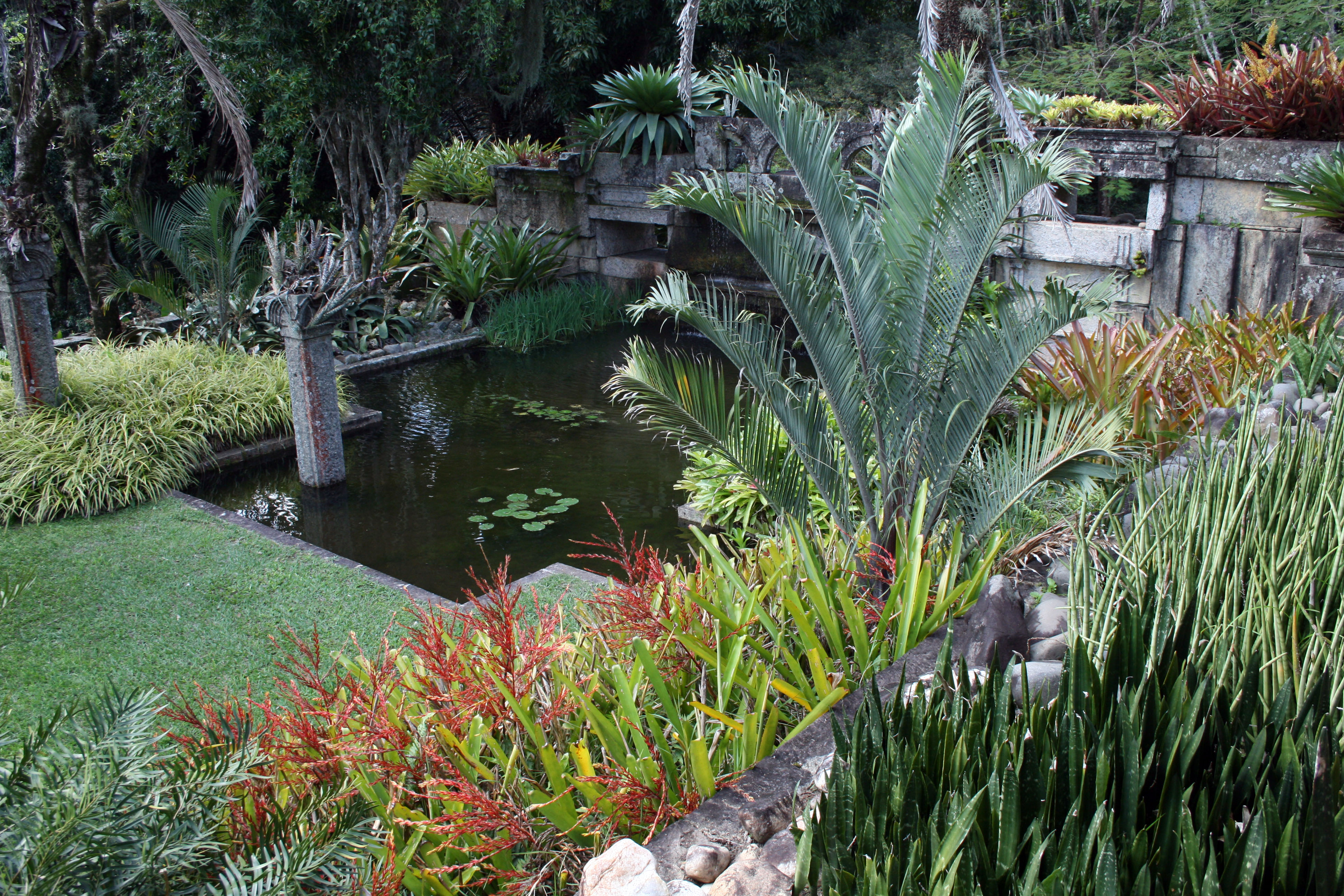
Farmhouse and chapel gardens in Barra de Guaratiba where Burle Marx died in 1994

In 1932, Burle Marx designed his first landscape for a private residence by the architects Lucio Costa and Gregori Warchavchik. This project, the Schwartz house, was the beginning of a collaboration with Costa which was enriched later by Oscar Niemeyer who designed the Brazilian Pavilion at the New York World's Fair in 1939. Niemeyer also designed the Pampulha complex in 1942 for which Marx designed gardens. His first garden design was completed in 1933. In 1937, Burle Marx gained international recognition and admiration for this abstract design of a roof garden for the Ministry of Education building. The design highlighted elements of tension and drama.

In 1949 he acquired the Sítio de Santo Antonio da Bica, a 365,000 m^{2} (90-acre) estate in the Barra de Guaratiba neighborhood on the outskirts of Rio de Janeiro. Burle Marx began taking expeditions into the Brazilian rain forest with botanists, landscape architects, architects and other researchers to gather plant specimens. He learned to practice studying plants in situ from the botanist Henrique Lahmeyer de Mello Barreto and established his garden, nursery and tropical plant collection at Guaratiba. This property was donated to the Brazilian government in 1985 and became a national monument. Now called Sítio Roberto Burle Marx, under the direction of IPHAN, it houses over 3,500 species of plants. The house was rebuilt in a valley on the site of a garden house belonging to the original plantation estate. In 2021, Sítio Roberto Burle Marx was inscribed on the UNESCO World Heritage List because of its unique Modernist design and its importance for environmental and cultural preservation. It is 23rd Brazilian location recognized on UNESCO’s list of World Heritage sites.

Roberto Burle Marx founded a landscape studio in 1955 and in the same year he founded a landscape company, called Burle Marx & Cia. Ltda. He opened an office in Caracas, Venezuela in 1956 with landscape architects Fernando Tábora and John Godfrey William Stoddart to create Caracas' largest public park, the Parque del Este and started working with architects Jose Tabacow and Haruyoshi Ono in 1968. Marx worked on commissions throughout Brazil, Argentina, in Chile and many other South American countries, France, South Africa, Washington D.C. and Los Angeles. Additionally his artwork can be found displayed throughout the city of Rio de Janeiro "it is an open-air museum of works displaying his unmistakable style, one wholly his own." Roberto Burle Marx's 62-year career ended when he died June 4, 1994, at age 84.

He spent time in the Brazilian forests where he was able to study and explore. Burle Marx was one of the first Brazilians to speak out against deforestation. This enabled him to add significantly to the botanical sciences, by discovering new rocks and plants for example. At least 50 plants bear his name. As an environmental advocate, Marx was also involved in efforts to protect and conserve the rain forest from the destructive commercial activities of deforestation for bananas and other crops and clear cutting of timber.

== Style ==
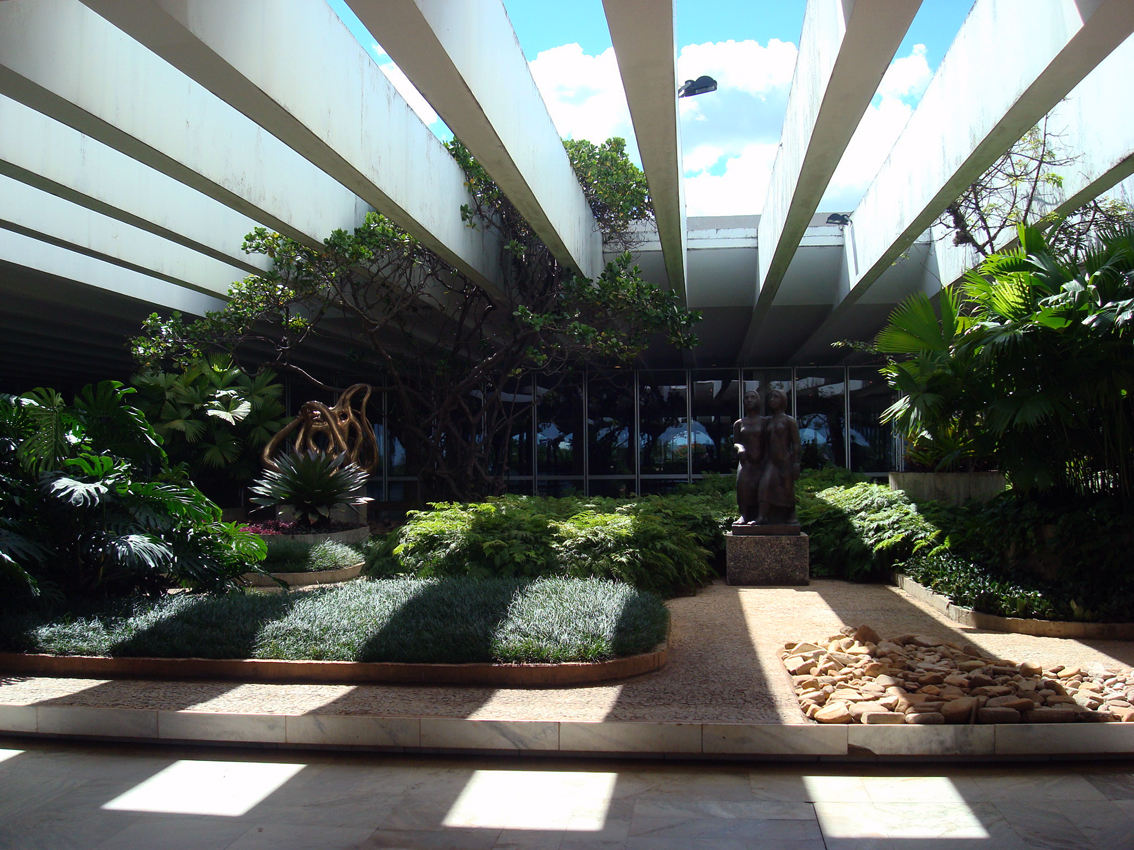
Itamaraty Palace, headquarters of the Ministry of External Relations in Brasília

Burle Marx's artistic style was avant-garde and modern. Much of his work has a sense of timelessness and perfection. He explored an anti-mimetic and skeptical aesthetic developed from modernism with a distinctly Brazilian style. His designs were also influenced by cubism and abstractionism. Another strong influence was Brazilian folk art.

His aesthetics were often nature based, for example, never mixing flower colours, utilisation of big groups of the same specimen, using native plants and making a rocky field into a relaxing garden. He was very interested in each plant's character and what effect that has on the whole garden. He sought a depth in his designs by understanding how animals interacted with plants and how they bloomed, amongst other plant characteristics. Burle Marx had a great skill in utilising the sculptural form of plants. Burle Marx was mindful of the dynamic of walking through a garden. The sensation of mobility is an important element of experiencing his landscapes. He also made clever use of enormous scale, lighting and reflection particularly in his use of water. Burle Marx was able to extend the architecture of a building into the garden. He preferred to work on public spaces because, in his words, they are able to provide dignity for the masses.

Marx's work "can be summarized in four general design concepts—the use of native tropical vegetation as a structural element of design, the rupture of symmetrical patterns in the conception of open spaces, the colorful treatment of pavements, and the use of free forms in water features." This approach is exemplified by the Copacabana Beach promenade, where native sea breeze resistant trees and palms appear in groupings along Avenida Atlantica. These groupings punctuate Portuguese stone mosaics which form a giant abstract painting where no section along the promenade is the same. This "painting" is viewed from the balconies of hotels, and offers an ever-changing view for those driving along the beach. The mosaics continue the entire two-and-a-half-mile distance of the beach. The water feature, in this case, is of course the ocean and beach, which is bordered by a 30-foot wide continuous scallop patterned mosaic walk. Copacabana Beach is "the most famous in Brazil."

== Awards ==
Roberto Burle Marx has received the following prizes, diplomas of merit and honorary memberships: The landscape architecture prize at the 2nd International Exhibition of Architecture (1953), title of Knight of the Order of the Crown from Belgium (1959), Diploma d’Honneur in Paris (1959), the Santos Dumont Medal of the Brazilian Government (1963), the Fine Arts Medal of The American Institute of Architects in Washington (1965), doctor of the Royal College of Art, London (1982) and an honorary doctorate from the Queen of the Netherlands. The Missouri Botanical Garden awarded him the Greensfelder Award and the Kentucky Botanic Garden proclaimed October 14, 1985, in his honor (Eliovson 1991).

== Works ==
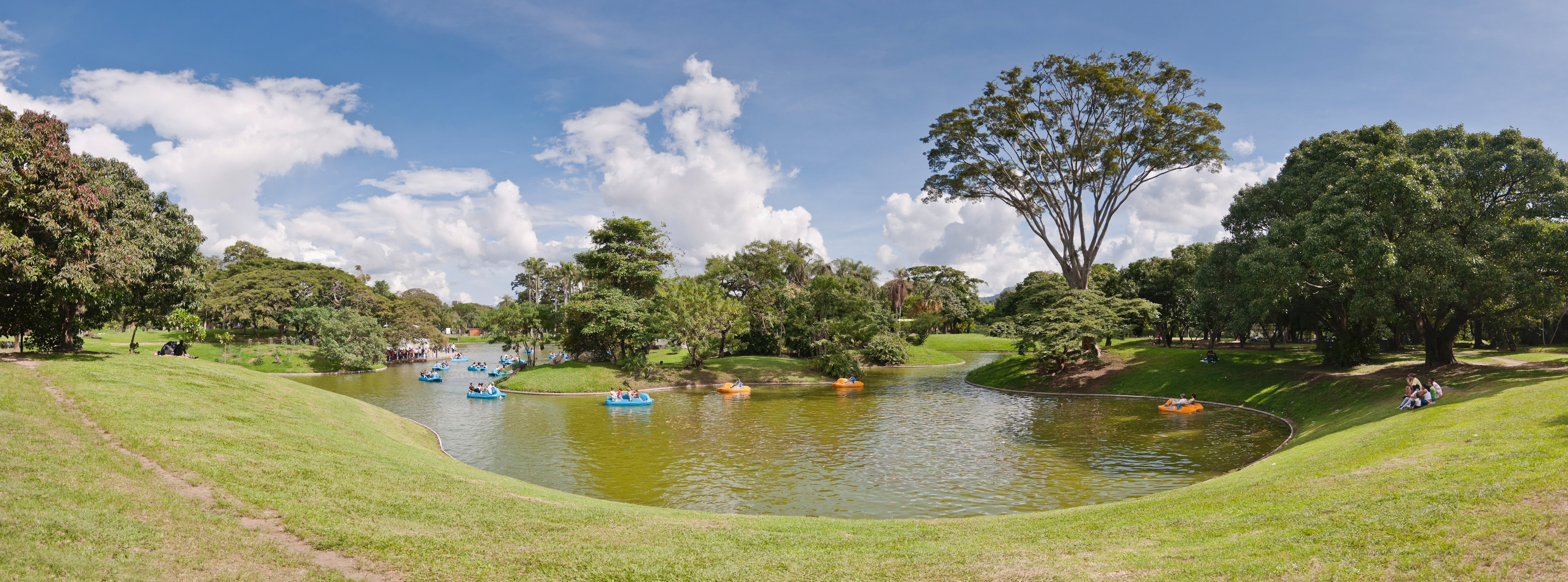
Parque del Este, Caracas

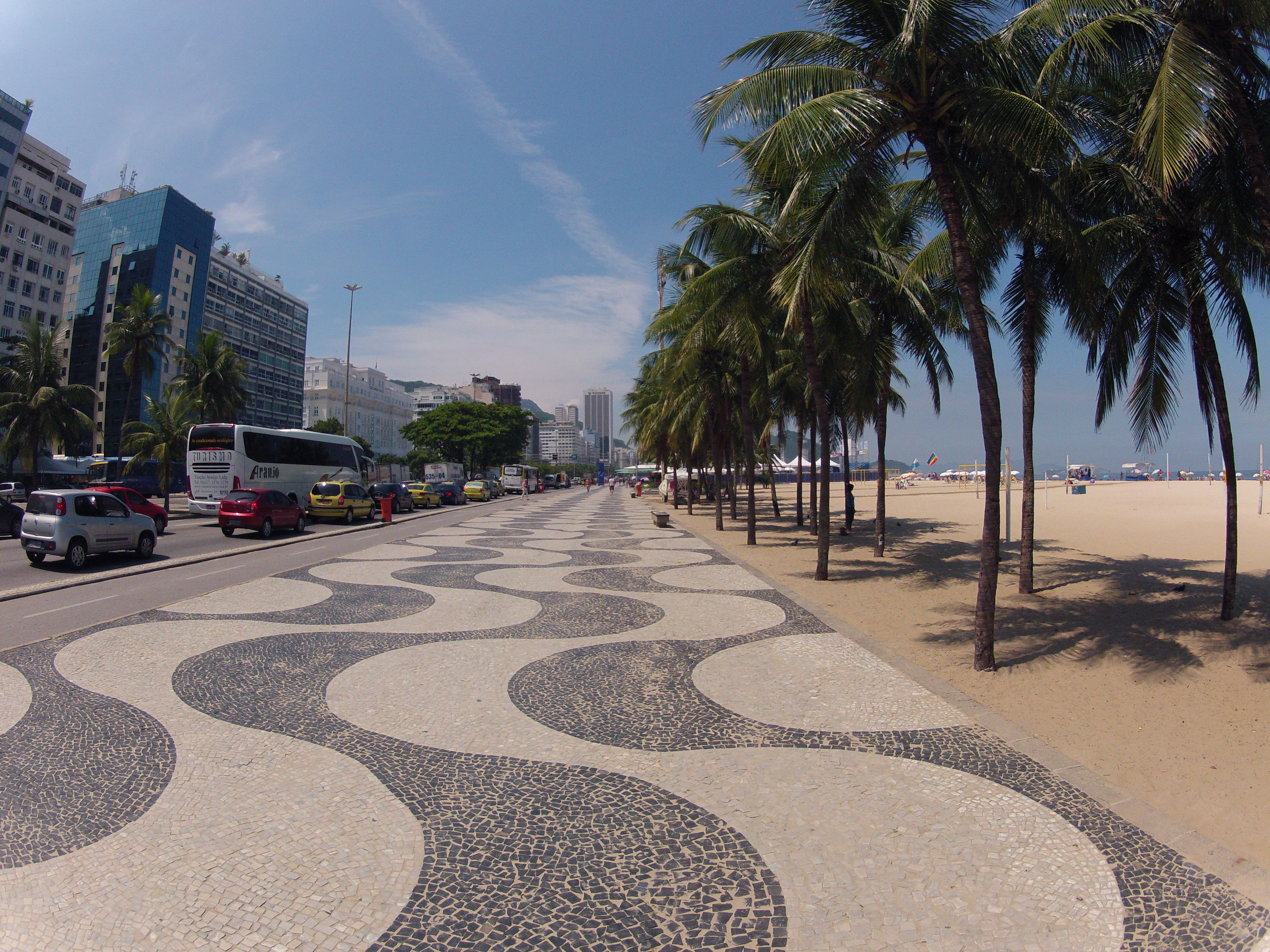
Copacabana beach promenade

- Landscape design of some gardens in the public buildings of Brasília

- Ministry of Army – water garden and excellent use of concrete forms.
- Foreign Affairs Building
- Ministry of Education
- Itamaraty Palace – headquarters of the Ministry of External Relations

- Copacabana promenade – Pavement landscape, large scale (4 km long) mosaic completed in 1970 on the famous Rio de Janeiro beach; influenced by Portuguese pavement
- Inhotim, Brumadinho
- Ibirapuera Park, São Paulo, 1954
- Flamengo Park – large public park in Rio de Janeiro built on landfill
- La Rinconada Hippodrome, Caracas, Venezuela
- Parque del Este, Caracas, Venezuela
- La Lagunita Country Club, Caracas, Venezuela
- Pampulha, Belo Horizonte
- Cascade Garden, Longwood Gardens, Pennsylvania, USA
- Biscayne Boulevard, Miami, Florida, USA (completed posthumously)
- Maracaibo Botanical Gardens, Maracaibo, Venezuela
- Peru Square, Buenos Aires, Argentina (Demolished)
- Kuala Lumpur City Centre (KLCC) Park, Kuala Lumpur, Malaysia
- Casa Forte Square (Praça de Casa Forte), Recife, Pernambuco
- Cascata Farm, Araras
- Ipanema Park, Ipatinga, Minas Gerais
- Burle Marx Garden in the Burle Marx Park, São Paulo

== Exhibitions ==
- 1948-52 - Painting toward architecture, Miller Company Collection of Abstract Art, several venues, US.
- 1949 - From Le Corbusier to Oscar Niemeyer: Savoye House - Tremaine House 1949, Museum of Modern Art, New York
- 1991 - Roberto Burle Marx: The unnatural art of the garden, Museum of Modern Art, New York
- 2016 - Roberto Burle Marx: Brazilian Modernist, Jewish Museum, New York.
- 2017 - Roberto Burle Marx: Joutras Gallery,Chicago Botanic Garden.
- 2017 - Tropische Moderne, Deutschen Bank KunstHalle, Berlin.
- 2019 - Brazilian Modern: The Living Art of Roberto Burle Marx, New York Botanical Garden.
- 2027 - Roberto Burle Marx. Modernismo tropical, Zentrum Paul Klee, Bern, Switzerland.

== See also ==
- List of landscape architects

== Bibliography ==
- William Howard Adams (1991). Roberto Burle Marx: The Unnatural Art of the Garden. Museum of Modern Art, New York. ISBN 0-8109-6096-6.
- Anita Berrizbeitia (2005). Roberto Burle Marx in Caracas: Parque del Este, 1956–1961. Penn Studies in Landscape Architecture, University of Pennsylvania Press.
- S. Eliovson; R. Burle Marx (1991). The Gardens of Roberto Burle Marx. Timber Press. ISBN 0-88192-160-2.
- M. Schwartz; M. I. Montero; R. Burle Marx (2001). Roberto Burle Marx. University of California Press. ISBN 0-520-23290-9.
- Roberto Burle Marx (1982). A Garden is Like a Poem. World Microfilms. ISBN 1-85035-075-2.
- Giulio G. Rizzo (1992). Roberto Burle Marx. Il giardino del Novecento (in Italian). Florence: Cantini editore.
- Giulio G. Rizzo; Il progetto dei grandi parchi urbani di Roberto Burle Marx, In "Paesaggio Urbano", vol. 4-5; pp. 82–89, 1995.
- Giulio G. Rizzo (2009). Il giardino privato di Roberto Burle Marx: Il Sìtio. Sessant'anni dalla fondazione. Cent'anni dalla nascita di Roberto Burle Marx (in Italian). Roma: Gangemi Editore. ISBN 978-88-492-1987-6.
- Vaccarino, R (2000), Roberto Burle Marx: Landscapes Reflected, Princeton Architectural Press with the Harvard University Graduate School of Design
- Roberto Silva (2006). New Brazilian Gardens: the Legacy of Burle Marx. Thames & Hudson. ISBN 978-0-500-51286-9.
- Marx, Roberto Burle; Cavalcanti, Lauro, eds. (2011). Roberto Burle Marx: The Modernity of Landscape. Actar, Barcelona. ISBN 978-84-92861-67-5. First English Language Edition.
- Gillian Mawrey (2001). "Roberto Burle Marx". Historic Gardens Review.

== Tribute ==
In 2014, Roberto Burle Marx was commemorated on his 20 year legacy reference: https://issuu.com/alejapv/docs/moderndesigners
