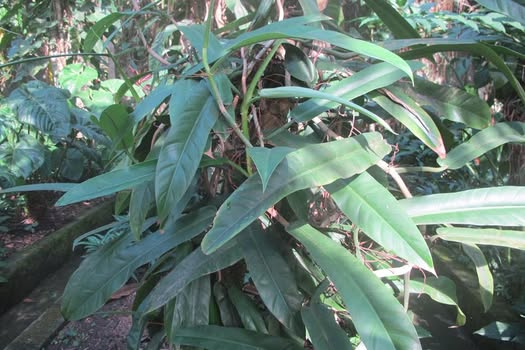

Scientific classification
- Kingdom: Plantae
- Clade: Tracheophytes
- Clade: Angiosperms
- Clade: Monocots
- Order: Alismatales
- Family: Araceae
- Genus: Philodendron
- Species: P. burle-marxii

Binomial name
- Philodendron burle-marxii G.M.Barroso

= Philodendron burle-marxii =

Species of plant

Philodendron burle-marxii is a plant in the genus Philodendron native to South America ranging from Colombia to Ecuador and Brazil. Named by Graziela Barroso after landscape architect Roberto Burle Marx, it is one of over 50 plants that bear his name. This aroid is a climber, and has green narrowly oblong leaves.

The popular cultivar, Philodendron 'Burle Marx," is not to be confused with this species. The cultivar can be distinguished by its shiny, elongated heart-shaped leaves, in contrast to the lanceolate leaves of Philodendron burle-marxii.

== See also ==
- List of Philodendron species
