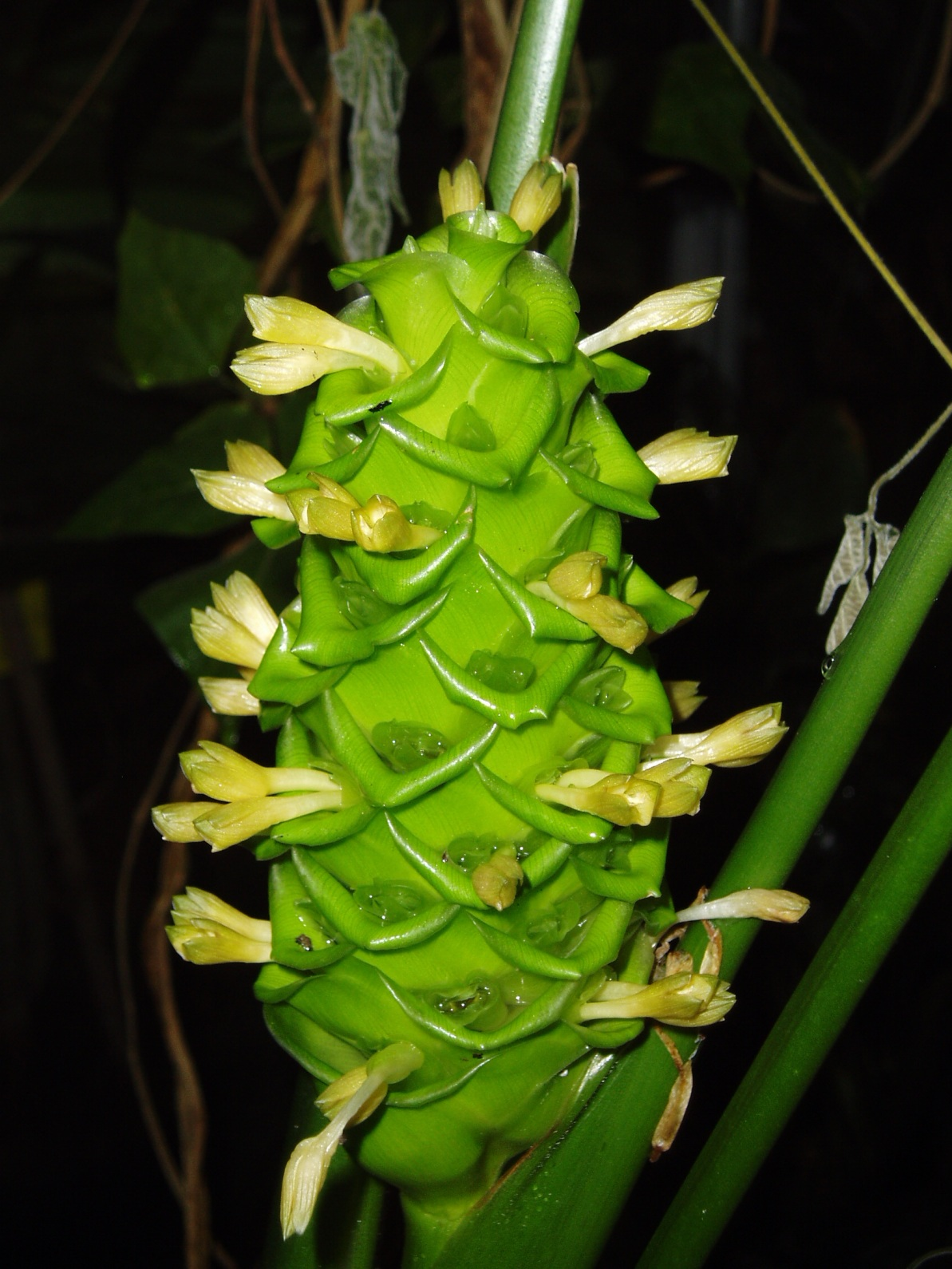

Scientific classification
- Kingdom: Plantae
- Clade: Embryophytes
- Clade: Tracheophytes
- Clade: Spermatophytes
- Clade: Angiosperms
- Clade: Monocots
- Clade: Commelinids
- Order: Zingiberales
- Family: Marantaceae
- Genus: Goeppertia
- Species: G. cylindrica

Binomial name
- Goeppertia cylindrica (Roscoe) Borchs. & S.Suárez

Synonyms
- Calathea cylindrica

= Goeppertia cylindrica =

Species of plant

Goeppertia cylindrica is a species of plant in the Marantaceae family. It is native to eastern and central Brazil.

Goeppertia cylindrica is closely related to Goeppertia burle-marxii, and may be confused with it when not flowering.

Goeppertia cylindrica can be used in floral arrangements.
