= Barra de Guaratiba =

- Neighborhood
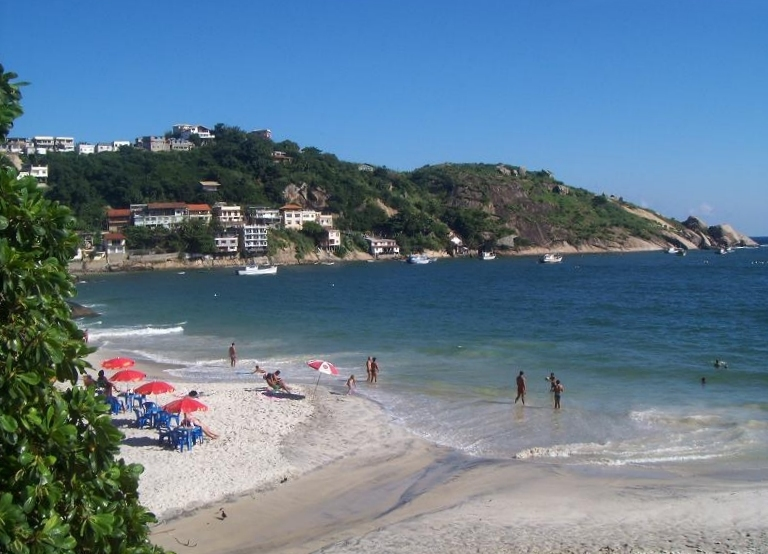

- Location in Rio de Janeiro Barra de Guaratiba (Brazil)
- Coordinates: 23°04′34″S 43°32′52″W
- Country: Brazil
- State: Rio de Janeiro (RJ)
- Municipality/City: Rio de Janeiro
- Zone: West Zone
- Barra de Guaratiba: 06/23/1981

Area
  - Total: 9,442 km^{2} (3,646 sq mi)
- Elevation: 15 m (49 ft)

Population
  - Total: 3,577
- Time zone: -3

Barra de Guaratiba is a neighborhood in the Western Zone of Rio de Janeiro, Brazil.

It borders Guaratiba, Vargem Grande, Recreio dos Bandeirantes and Grumari neighborhoods. This place is 56 km from Rio de Janeiro's downtown. It is a beachy neighborhood. The Guaratiba Beach is next to it. There are mangroves in the surroundings and it is characterized by mountains of virgin rainforest and numerous restaurants and bars specializing in seafood.

Barra de Guaratiba´s Gallery
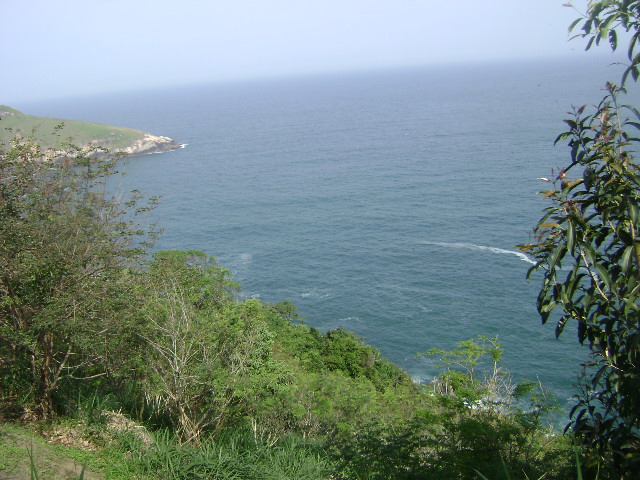
Turtle Stone Head and the Sea

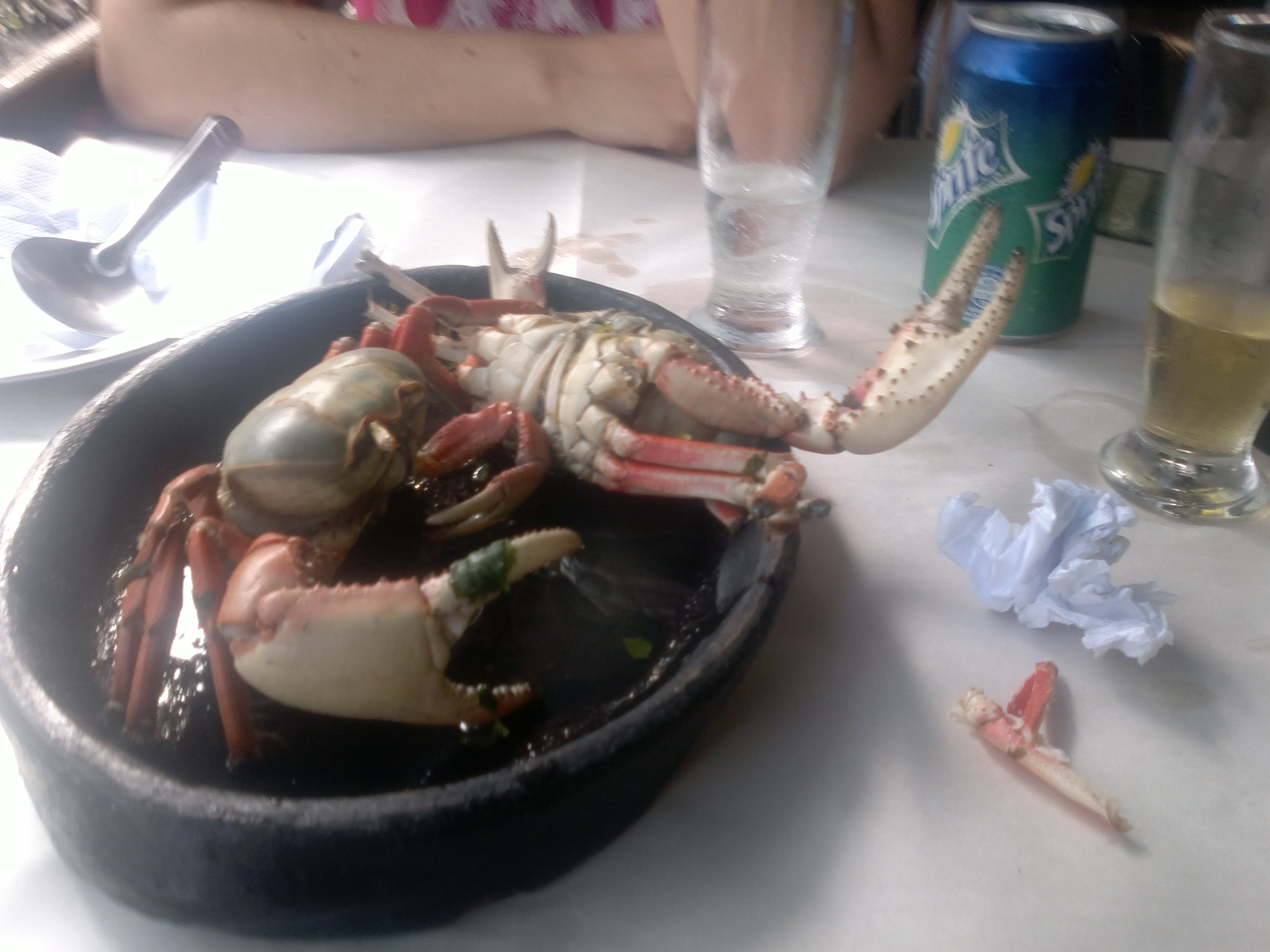
Typical Dishes served at Barra de Guaratiba Restaurants

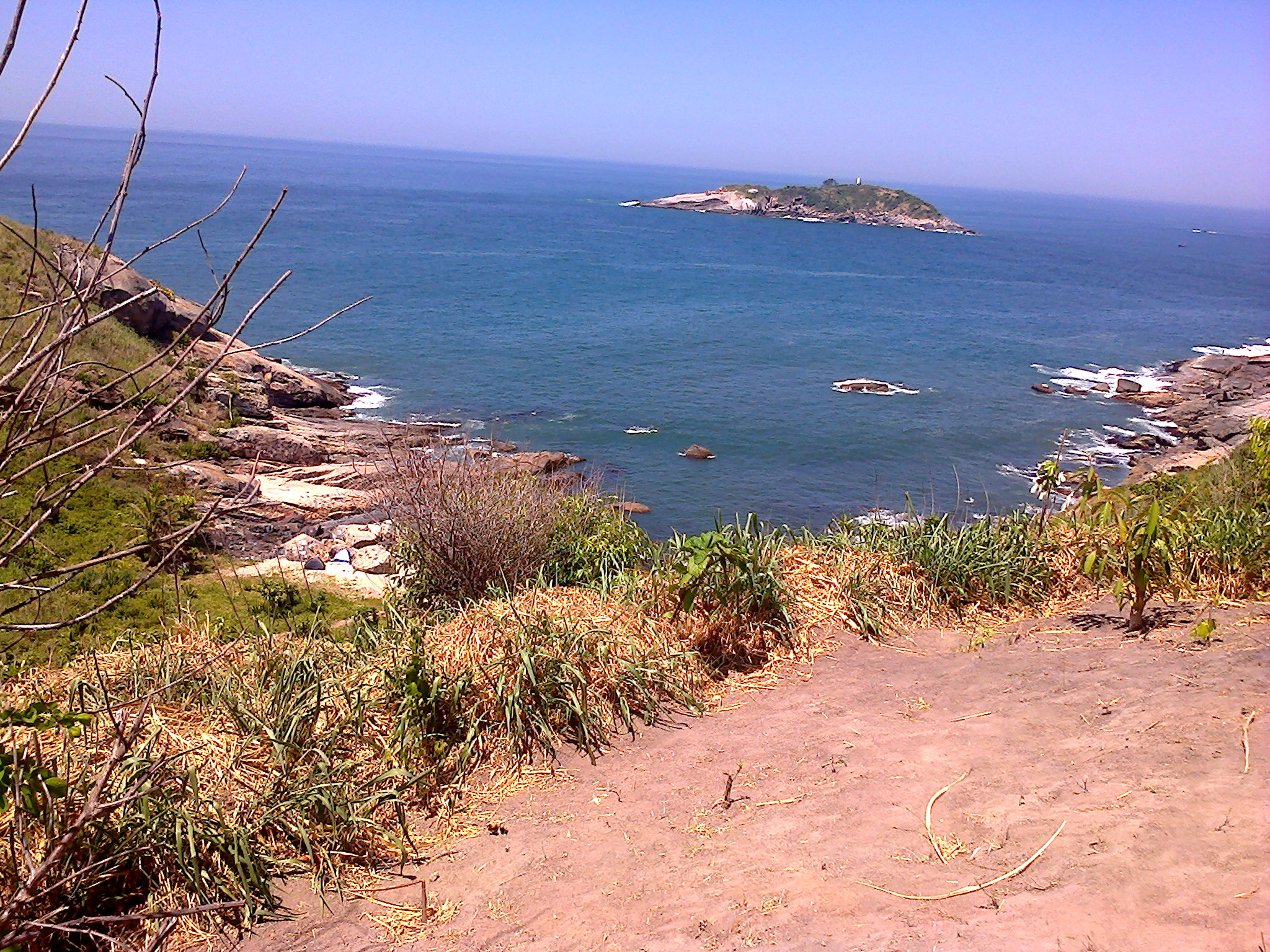
Path to Perigoso Beach near Grumari Neighborhood
