= Francesco Moschini =

Italian architect, art critic and architectural historian

Francesco Moschini (born 1948, Bogliaco, (fraction of Gargnano), Italy) is an Italian architect, art historian, historian and professor of architecture at the Polytechnic University of Bari. Since 2008 he has been appointed member of the Accademia di San Luca and since 2011 he is its general secretary.

== Biography ==
In 1969, after his secondary studies in Brescia, he moved to Rome to attend the Centro sperimentale di cinematografia, at the same time he enrolled in the Faculty of Architecture at the University of Rome. At the same time he follows a series of courses at the Faculty of Letters and philosophy, where he takes exams with Giulio Carlo Argan, Emilio Garroni, Alberto Asor Rosa and with Ferruccio Marotti. Since 1974 he has been a member of the International Association of Art Critics (IAIS). He is a member of the Scientific Council of certain magazines, including "Paesaggio Urbano", "Il Disegno di Architettura" and of the "Centro di Studi per la Storia dell'Architettura" Center for Studies for the History of architecture. From 1982 to 1985, he collaborated with the magazine Domus. In 1978, he founded in Rome the A.A.M. Architettura Arte Moderna a center for the production and promotion of cultural initiatives. Since 1993 opened a new head office of A.A.M. in Milan. In 2003 in Bari, at the Department of Architecture and Town Planning of the Polytechnic School of Bari, he created the Fondo Francesco Moschini consisting of a donation of more than 70,000 volumes, already from its private library.

== Books ==
- Aldo Rossi. Progetti e disegni 1962–1979, Edizioni Centro Di, Firenze settembre 1979 International co-editions: Rizzoli International Publications, New York; Academy Edition, London; L'Équerre editeur, Paris; Xarait, Madrid.
- Mario Bellini. Italian Beauty, Silvana Editoriale, 2017
