= Paesaggio Urbano =

Paesaggio Urbano - Urban Design
- Editor: Gruppo Maggioli
- Categories: architecture, urban design, design
- Frequency: bimonthly
- Publisher: Gruppo Maggioli
- Total circulation: 20,000 copies
- First issue: 1989
- Country: Italy
- Based in: Santarcangelo di Romagna
- Language: English, Italian
- Website: www.paesaggiourbano.net
- ISSN: 1120-3544

Paesaggio Urbano - Urban Design is a bimonthly magazine focusing on architecture and urban design, founded in 1989, published by Gruppo Maggioli. The magazine offers a multidisciplinary approach on urban phenomena like sociology, urban typology, economics, architecture and local and international cultural trends. The main focus of the magazine is the urban transformation and the analysis of influencing factors that impact on contemporary architecture. Since 2010 the magazine has started its internationalization process offering contents in English as part of its major restyle in 2011.

Every issue include a monographic dossier focusing on specific topics, like colour, building renovation, sustainability and urban design related themes.

== Organisation ==
=== Editorial board ===
- Editor-in-Chief: Amalia Maggioli
- Director: Marcello Balzani
- Vice Director: Nicola Marzot

=== Scientific Committee ===
- Paolo Baldeschi (University of Florence, Architecture)
- Lorenzo Berna (University of Perugia, Engineering)
- Marco Bini (University of Florence, Architecture)
- Ricky Burdett (London School of Economics)
- Giovanni Carbonara (University Valle Giulia, Rome, Architecture)
- Manuel Gausa (University of Genova, Architecture)
- Pierluigi Giordani (University of Padova, Engineering)
- Giuseppe Guerrera (University of Palermo, Architecture)
- Thomas Herzog (Technical University of Munich)
- Winy Maas (Technische Universiteit Delft)
- Francesco Moschini (Polytechnic University of Bari)
- Attilio Petruccioli (Polytechnic University of Bari)
- Franco Purini (University Valle Giulia, Rome, Architecture)
- Carlo Quintelli (University of Parma, Architecture)
- Alfred Rütten (University of Erlangen–Nuremberg)
- Livio Sacchi (University of Chieti-Pescara, Architecture)
- Pino Scaglione (University of Trento, Engineering)
- Giuseppe Strappa (University Valle Giulia, Rome, Architecture)
- Kimmo Suomi (University of Jyväskylä)
- Francesco Taormina (University Tor Vergata, Rome, Engineering)

== Website and the Vimeo Channel ==
The magazine went online and created a website to make its archive available to a wider audience. The website is constantly updated with the latest issues. Issues released before 2010 present magazines' covers and the complete table of contents. Issues published from 2011 presents English abstracts of all articles and an English version of the main articles. Since 2012 the magazine launched a Vimeo channel offering a number of videos and documentaries which complete the èrinted articles and provide more insights on the leading topics.

== See also ==
- Gruppo Maggioli
