= Grumari =

- Neighborhood
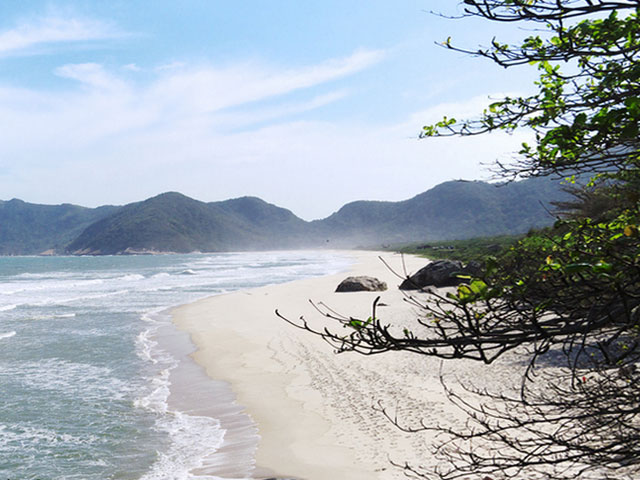

- Location in Rio de Janeiro Grumari (Brazil)
- Coordinates: 23°03′12″S 43°32′06″W
- Country: Brazil
- State: Rio de Janeiro (RJ)
- Municipality/City: Rio de Janeiro
- Zone: Southwest Zone

Grumari is a neighborhood in the Southwest Zone of Rio de Janeiro, Brazil. Grumari is a municipal park and is the city's only neighborhood with no residents. Grumari has beaches that have not changed in hundreds of years. Salt marsh vegetation grows next to the beach and a rain forest surrounds its hills.

A nude beach is next to Grumari beach called Abricó beach (Portuguese for Apricot beach). It is the only nude beach around the city. Five virgin beaches with pristine vegetation are in this neighborhood: Inferno Beach (Hell's beach), Funda beach (Deep Beach), Búzios beach (Whelks beach), Meio's beach (middle's beach) and Perigoso beach (dangerous beach).

The word Grumari comes from ancient South American dialects. the word refers to the tip of a mammal's nipples. In the same way, the beach sticks out onto the ocean, "feeding" the fish.

== Gallery ==
Grumari Neighborhood Gallery
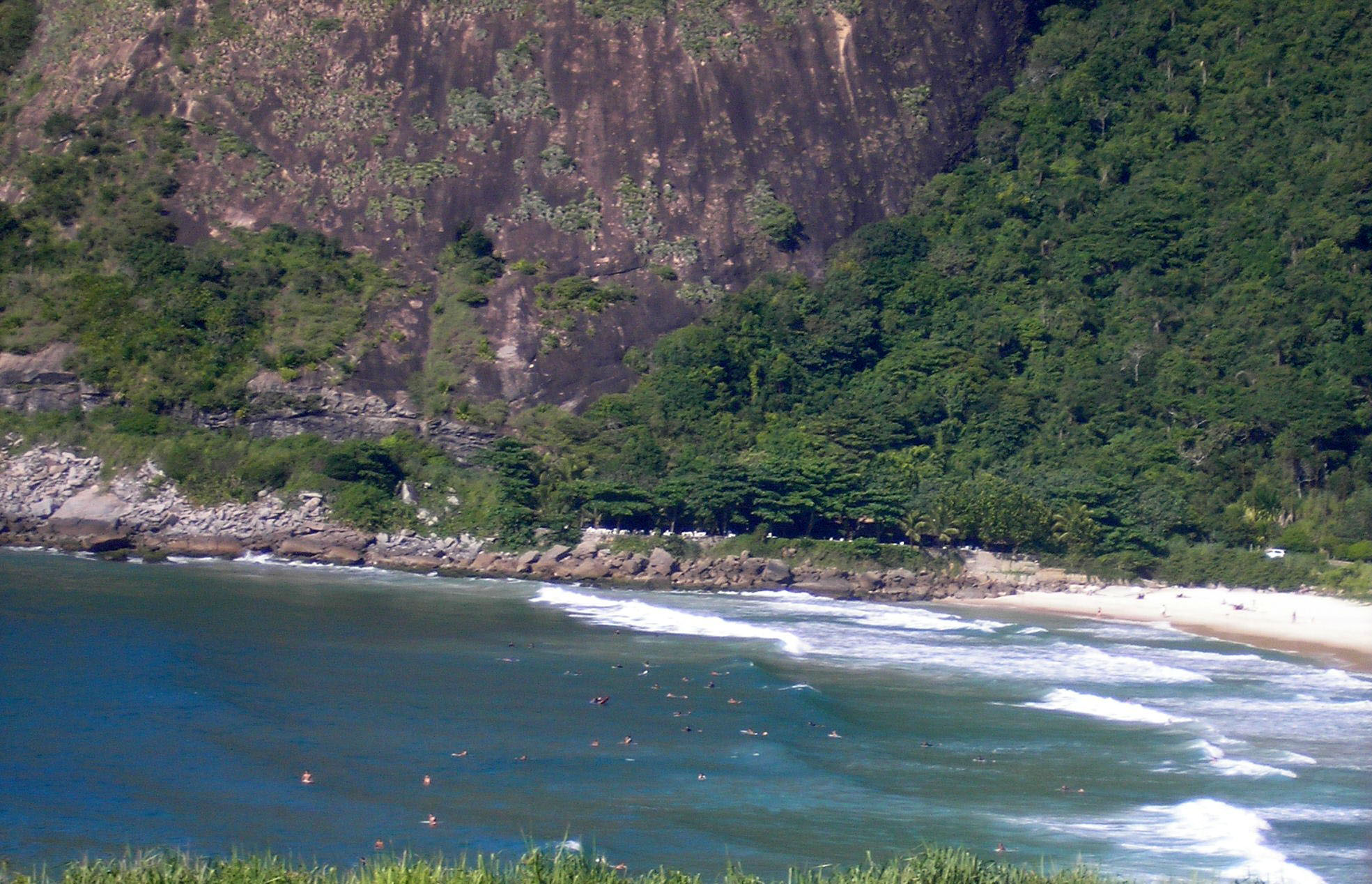
Prainha, called "little beach" in English

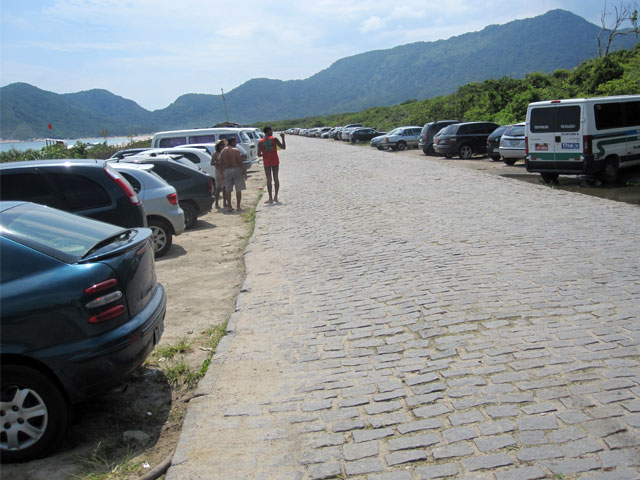
Grumari Beach Parking

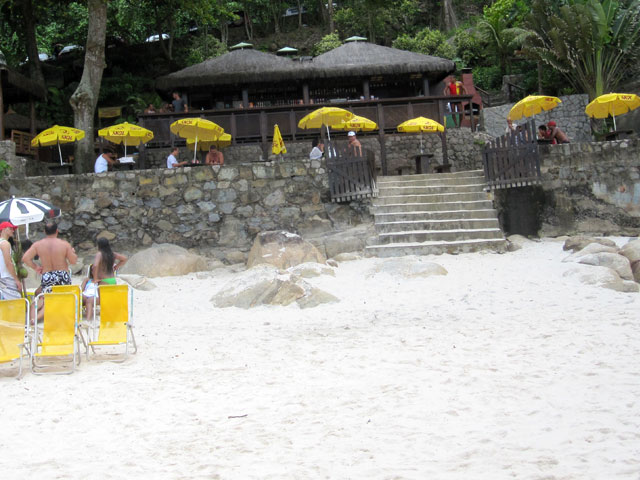
Kiosk on the beach

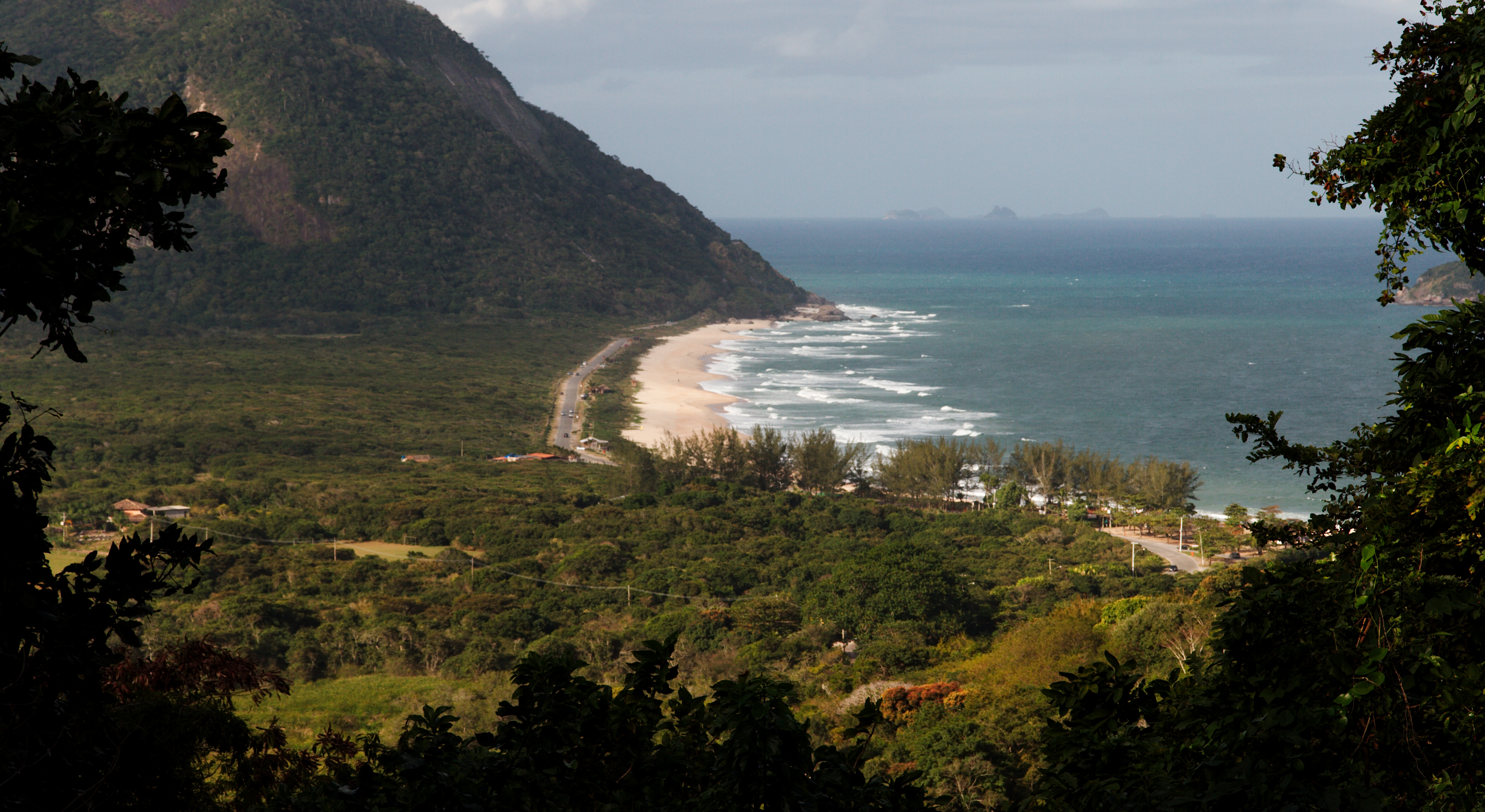
Grumari Panorama

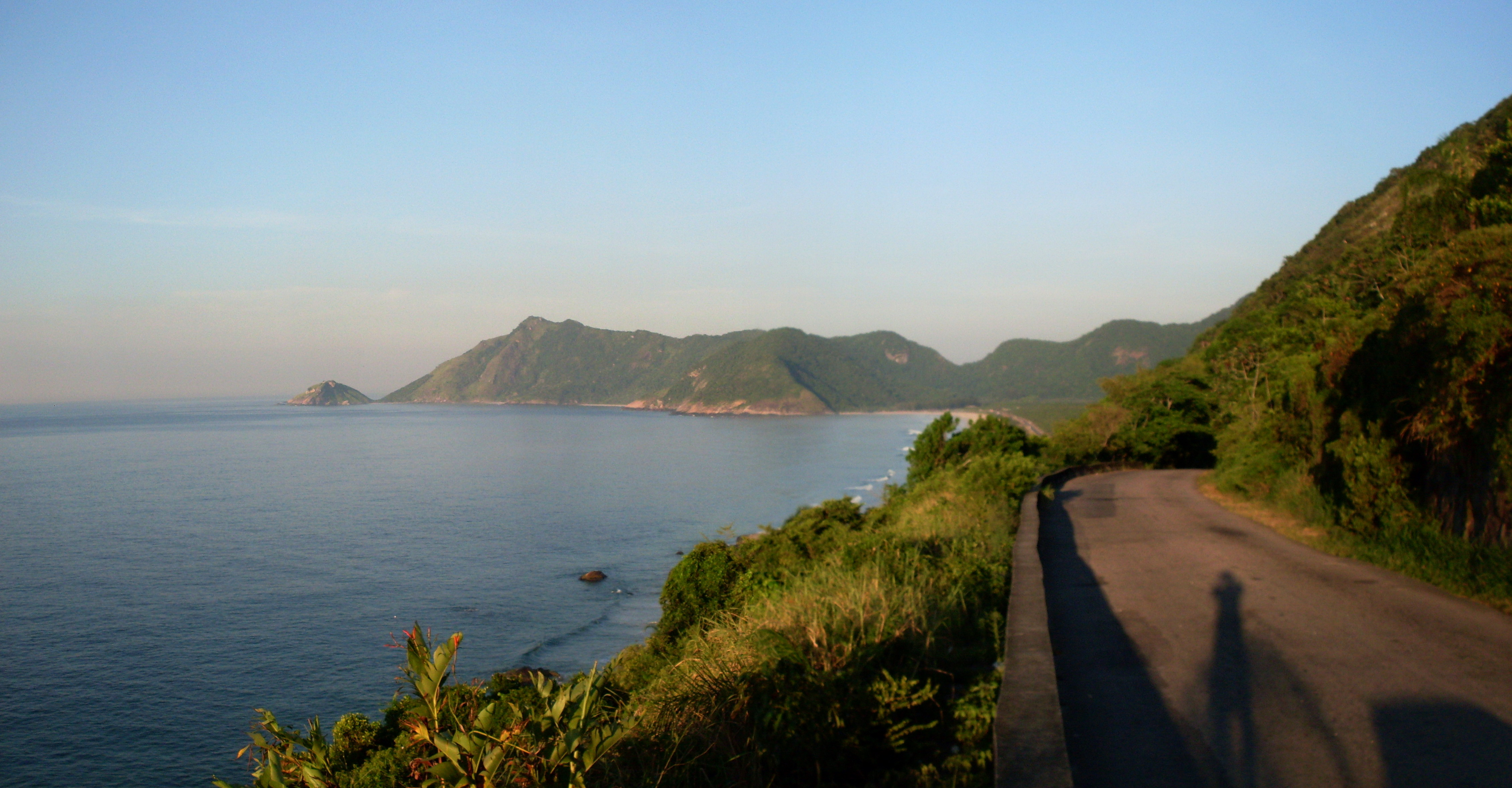
Road to Grumari Beach

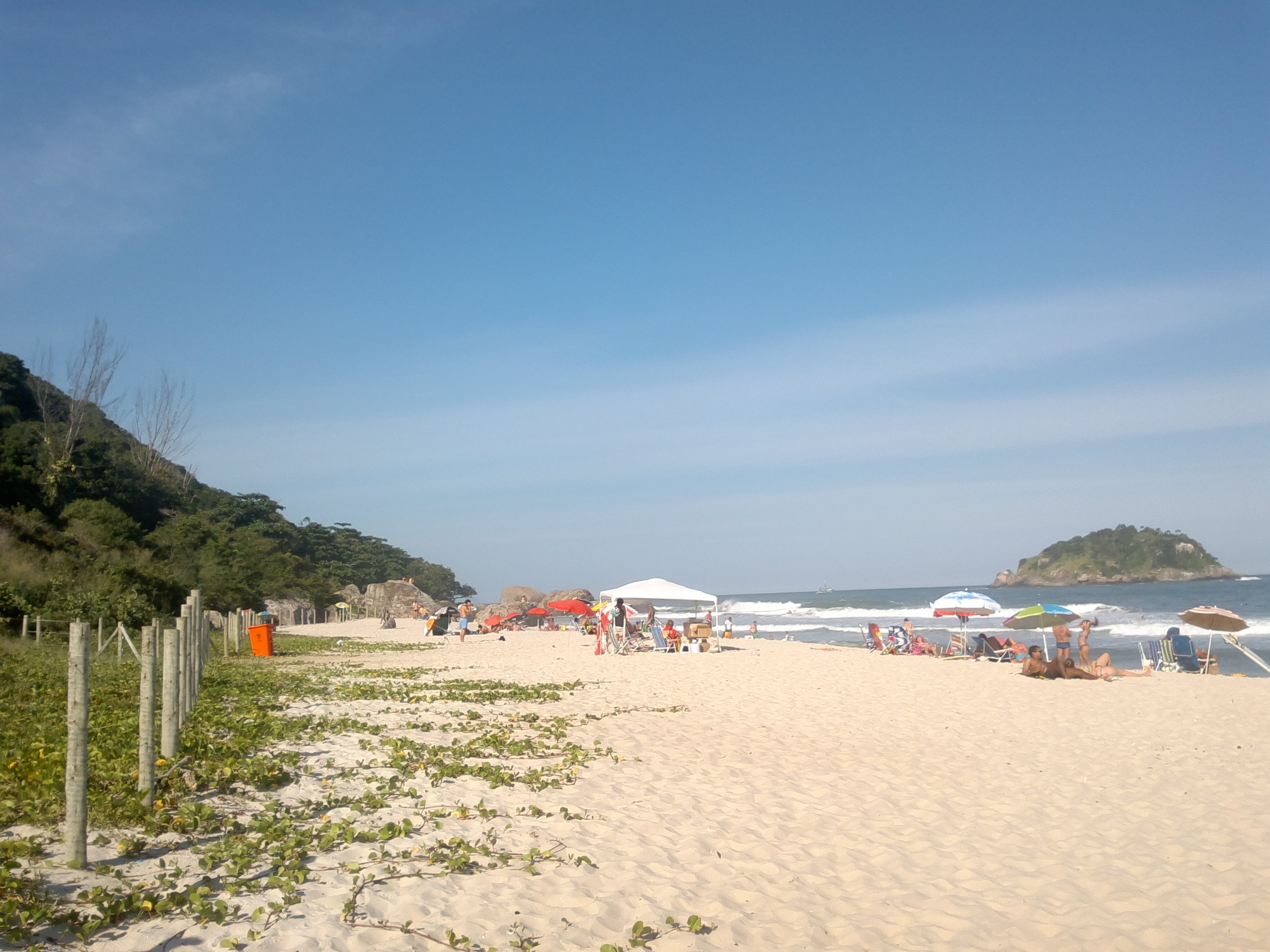
Grumari Beach, West Zone of Rio de Janeiro City, Left corner of the beach

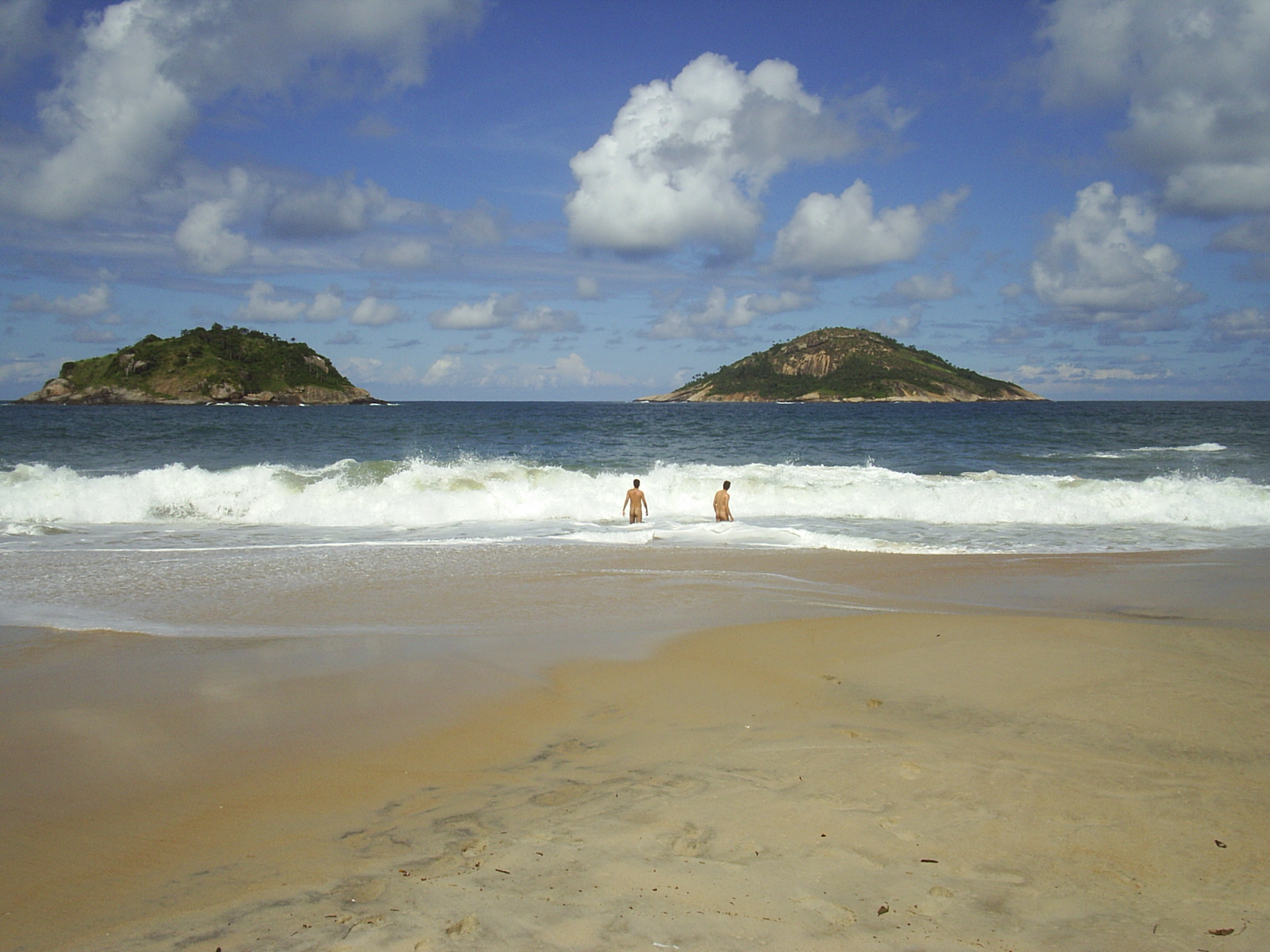
A Nude Beach at Grumari

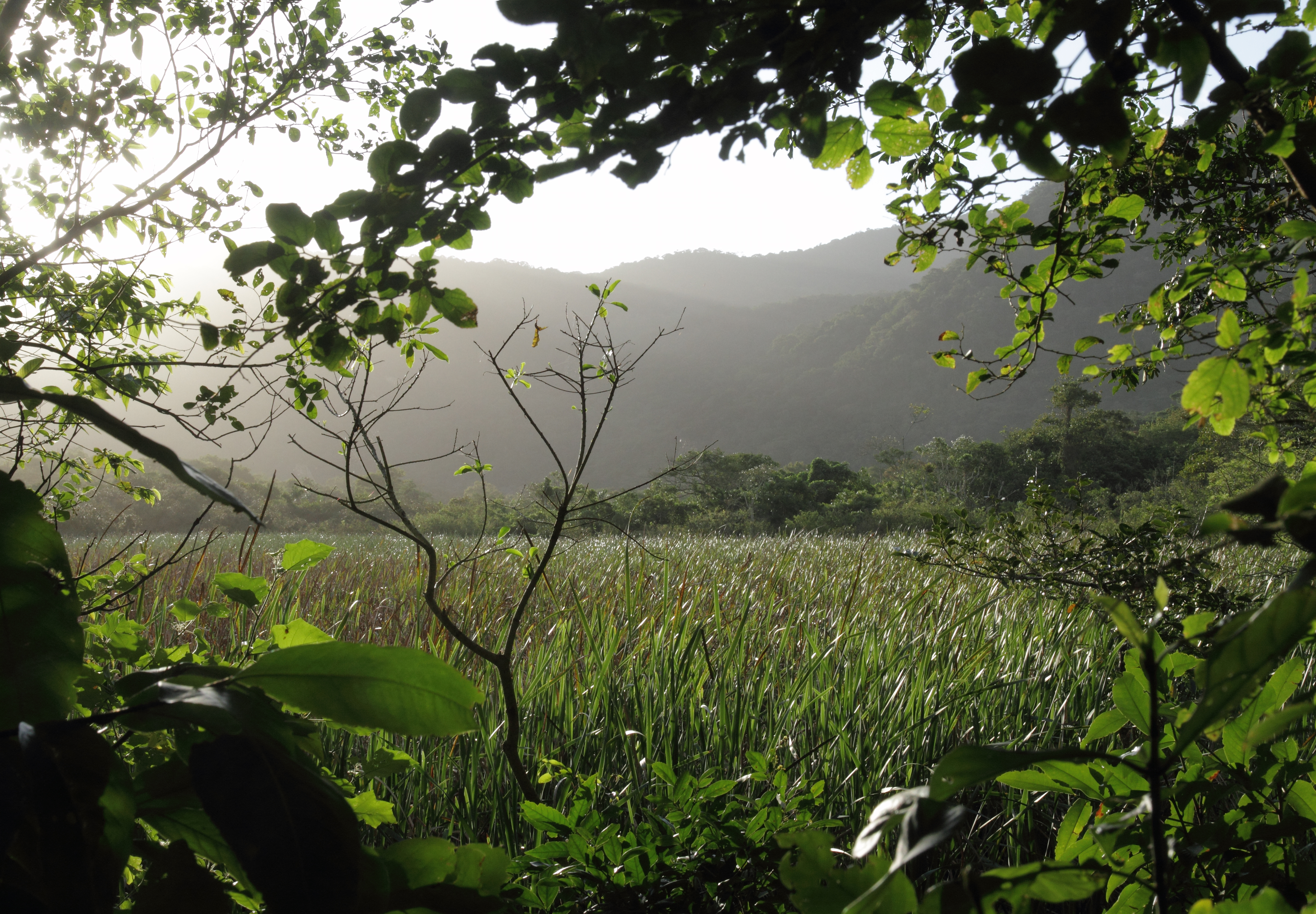
Grumari Swamps

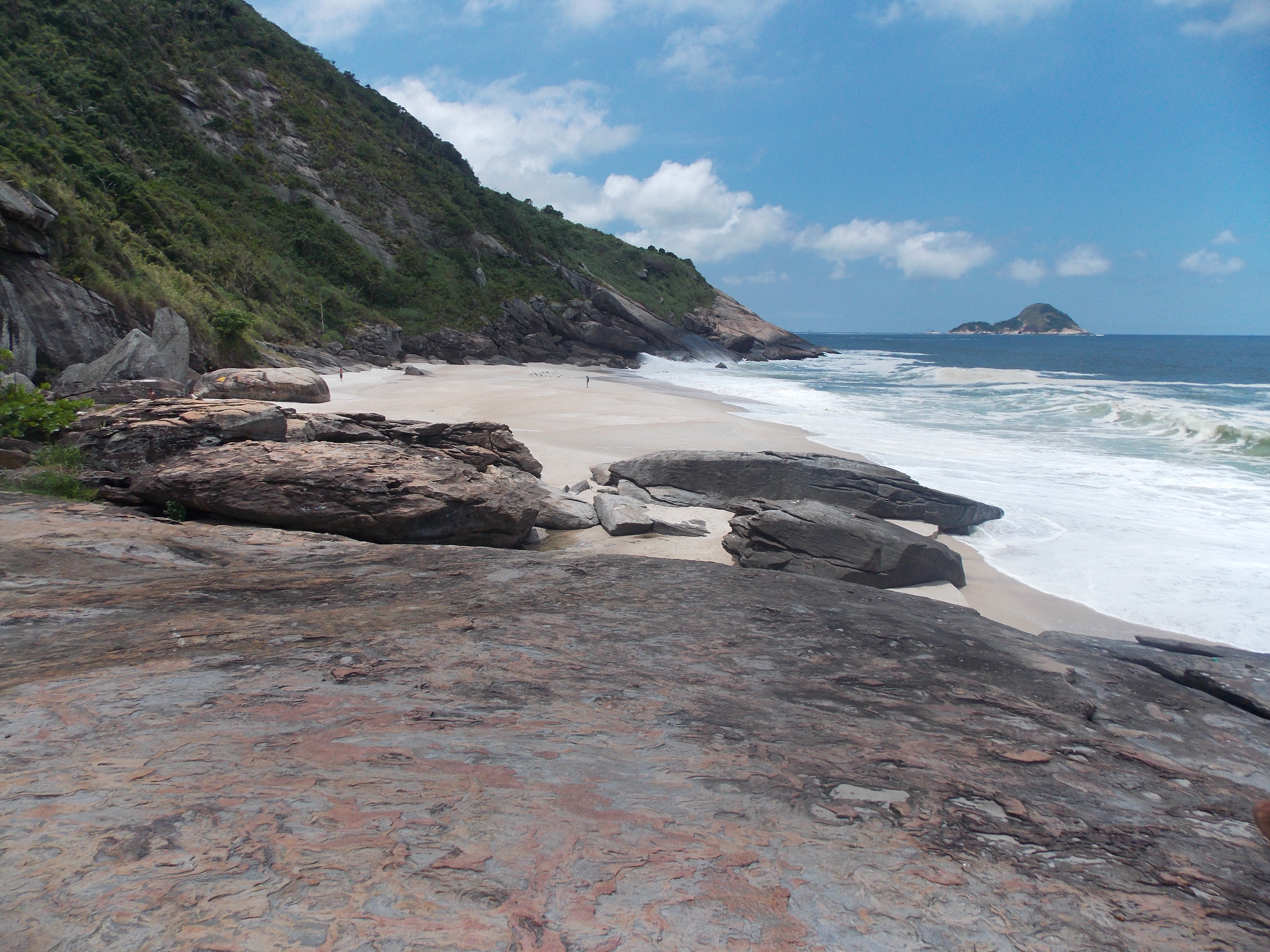
Wild Virgin Beach at Grumari Neighborhood. Hell´s Beach or Praia do Inferno, in Portuguese

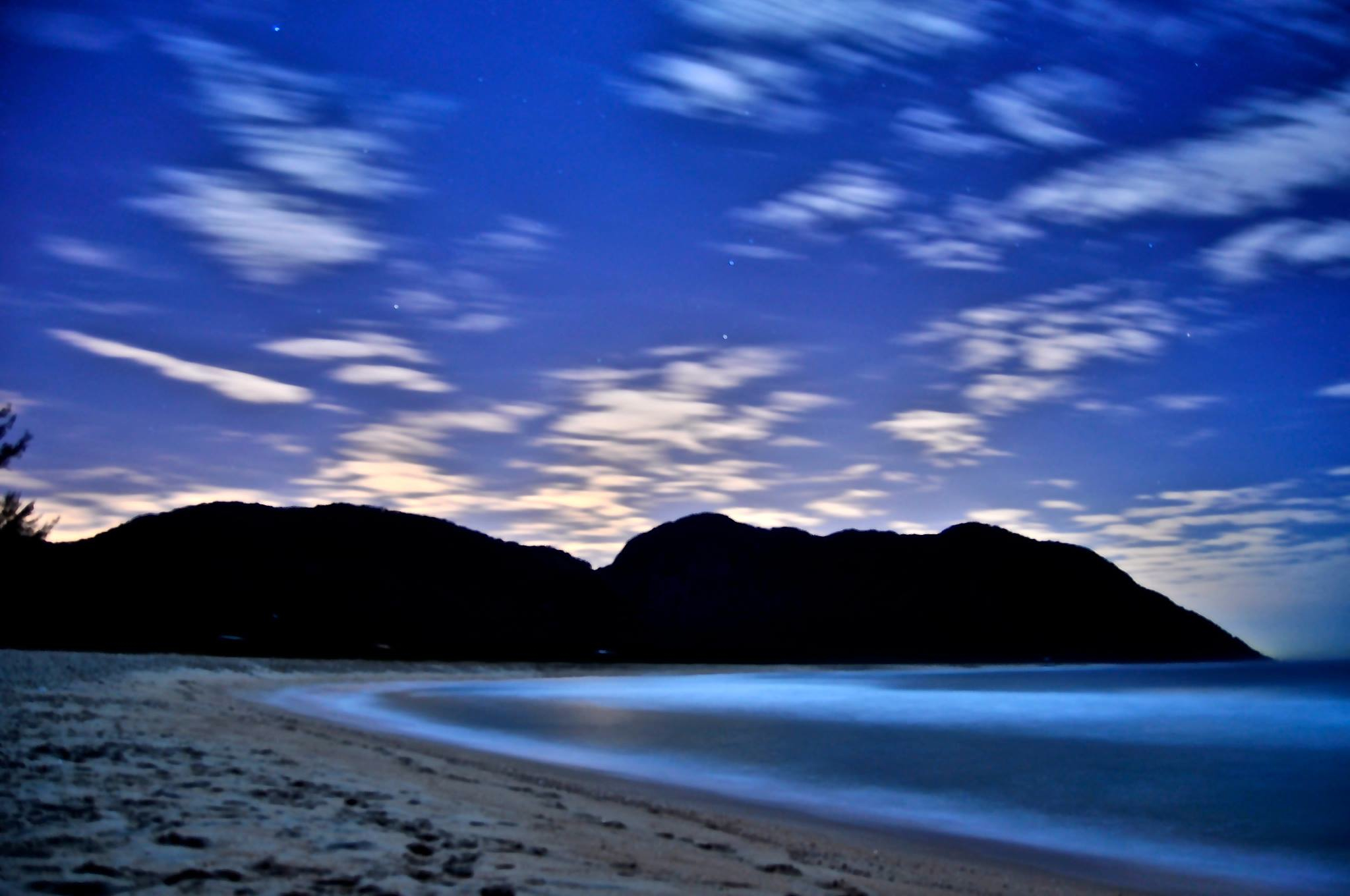
Night view Of Grumari
