= Estádio Municipal João Lamego Netto =

Football stadium in Brazil

Coordinates: 19°28′15″S 42°32′31″W

- Lamegão; Ipatingão
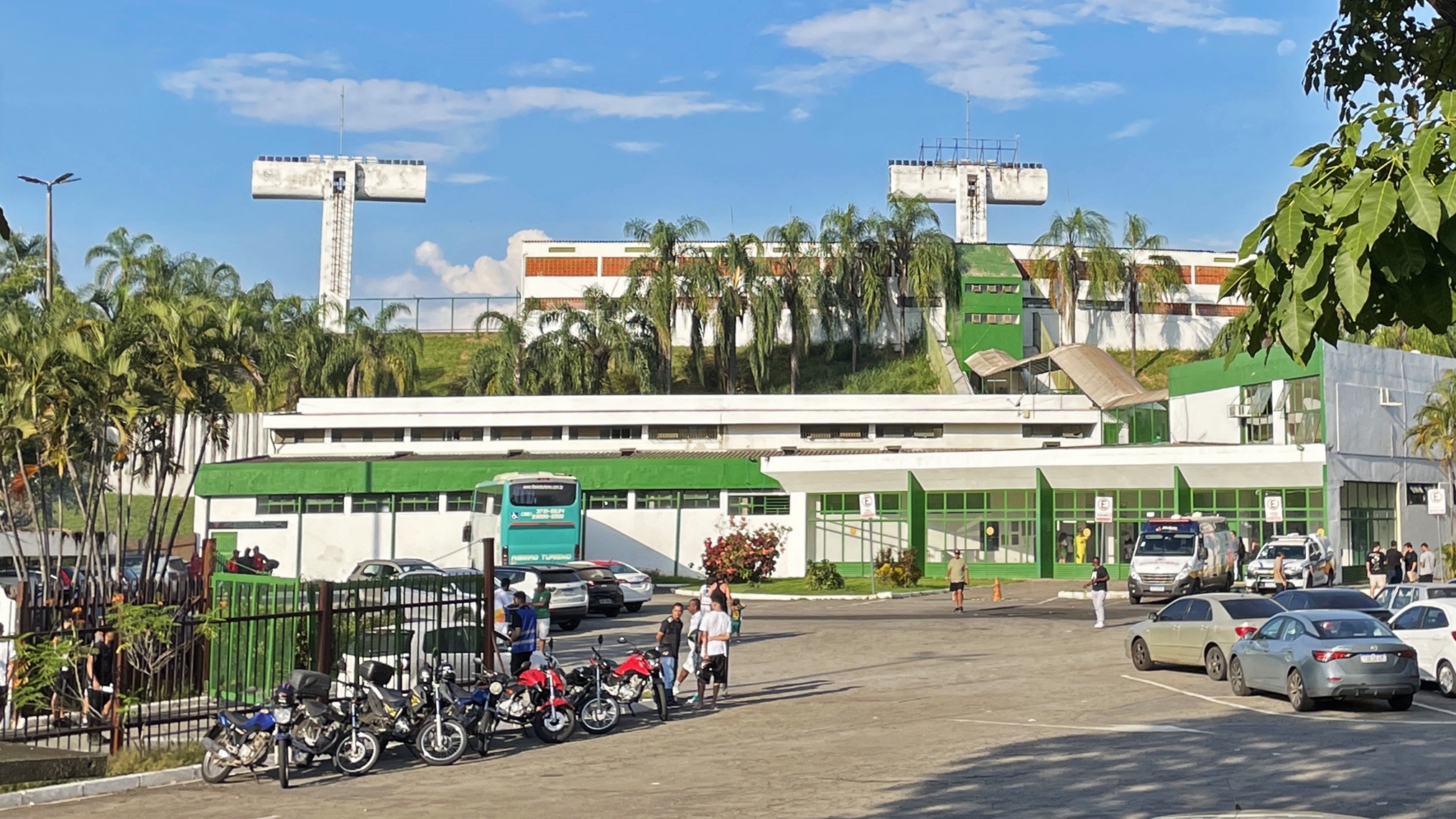
- Sisbrace
- Interactive map of Estádio Municipal João Lamego Netto
- Former names: Estádio Municipal Epaminondas Mendes Brito (1982-2011)
- Location: Ipatinga, Minas Gerais, Brazil
- Owner: Municipality of Ipatinga
- Capacity: 22,500
- Surface: Grass
- Field size: 110 m × 75 m (361 ft × 246 ft)

Construction
- Opened: November 23, 1982

Tenant
- Ipatinga Futebol Clube (1998-2012, 2014-present)

Estádio Municipal João Lamego Netto, usually known as Lamegão or Ipatingão, is a multi-purpose stadium in Ipatinga, Brazil. It is currently used mostly for football matches. Ideal futebol Clube usually play their home matches at the stadium. Social Futebol Clube, from the neighbor city Coronel Fabriciano, has its own stadium, but sometimes plays its home matches at Ipatingão, because of its larger capacity and better structure. The stadium has a current maximum capacity of 10,000 people and was built in 1982.

Lamegão is owned by the Ipatinga. It is named after a former mayor of Ipatinga named João Lamego Netto. The stadium was previously named Estádio Municipal Epaminondas Mendes Brito, after Epaminondas Mendes Brito, who was the engineer responsible for the stadium's construction. He died shortly before the stadium inauguration.

== History ==
In 1982, the works on Ipatingão were completed. The inaugural match was played on November 23 of that year, when Cruzeiro beat Ipatinga All Stars 3–0. The first goal of the stadium was scored by Cruzeiro's Eudes.

The stadium's attendance record currently stands at 25,000, set on April 7, 1996 when Atlético Mineiro beat Cruzeiro 2–1.

It was renamed to Estádio Municipal João Lamego Netto in 2011, after the former mayor of Ipatinga João Lamego Netto died in April of that year.

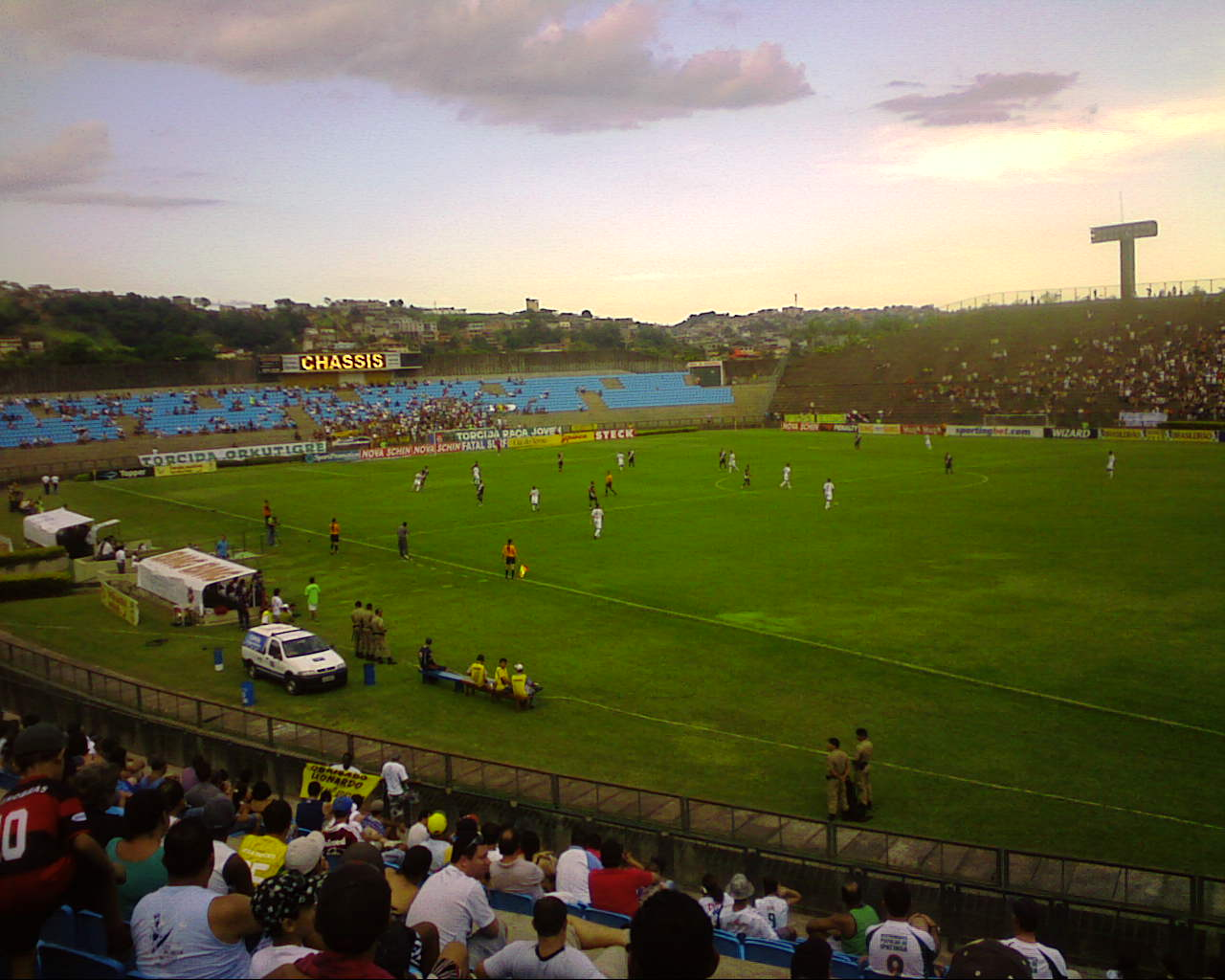
Interior

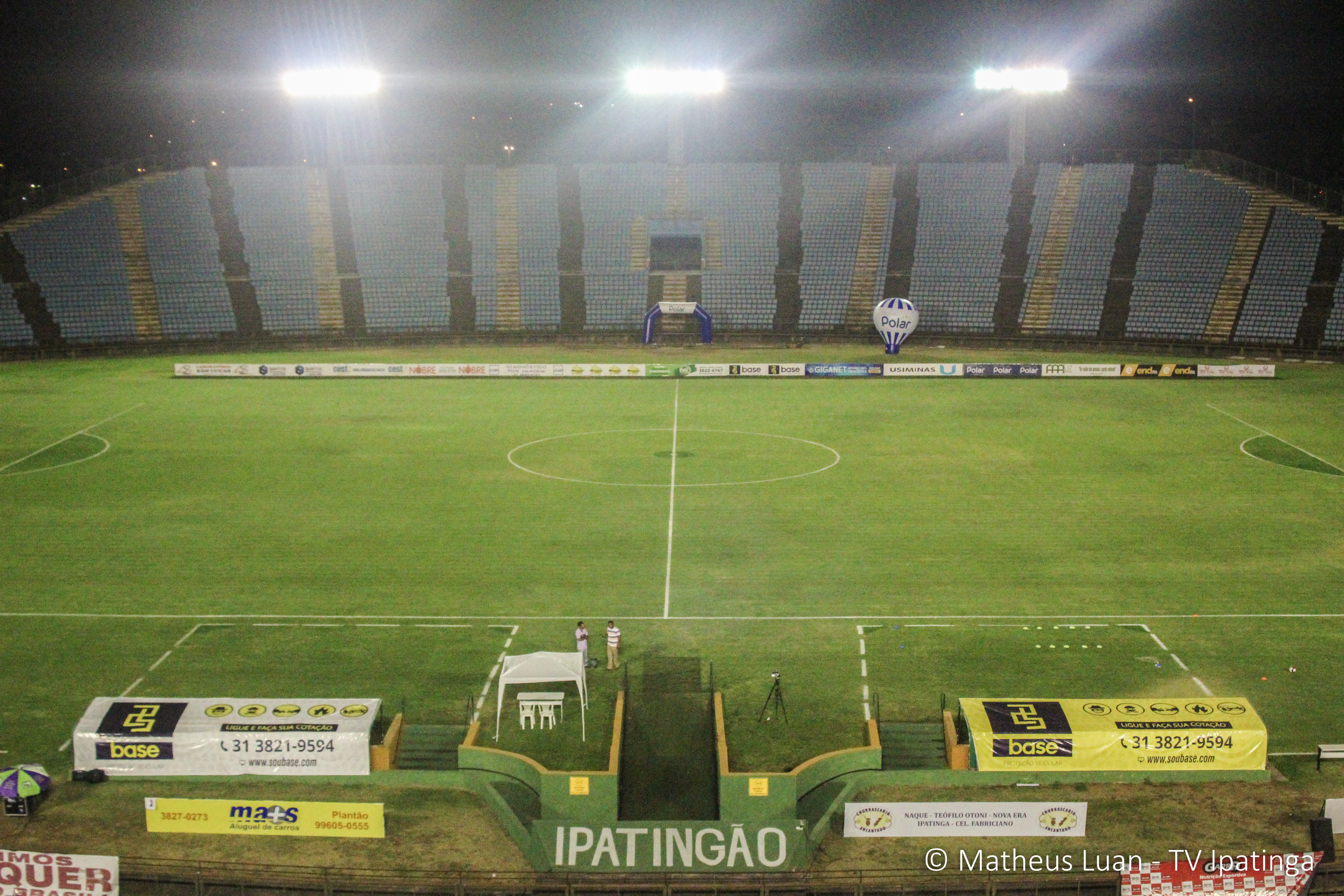
Noturn view
