= List of shopping centers in Brazil =

This is a list of shopping malls in Brazil.

== Bahia ==
- Boulevard Shopping Feira de Santana
- Aeroclube Plaza Show Mall – former open-air shopping and entertainment complex in Salvador, Bahia. The complex was closed to the public on 1 May 2014, when its last operating attraction, the UCI cinema, ceased operations, and demolition of the former shopping center began on 5 May 2014.
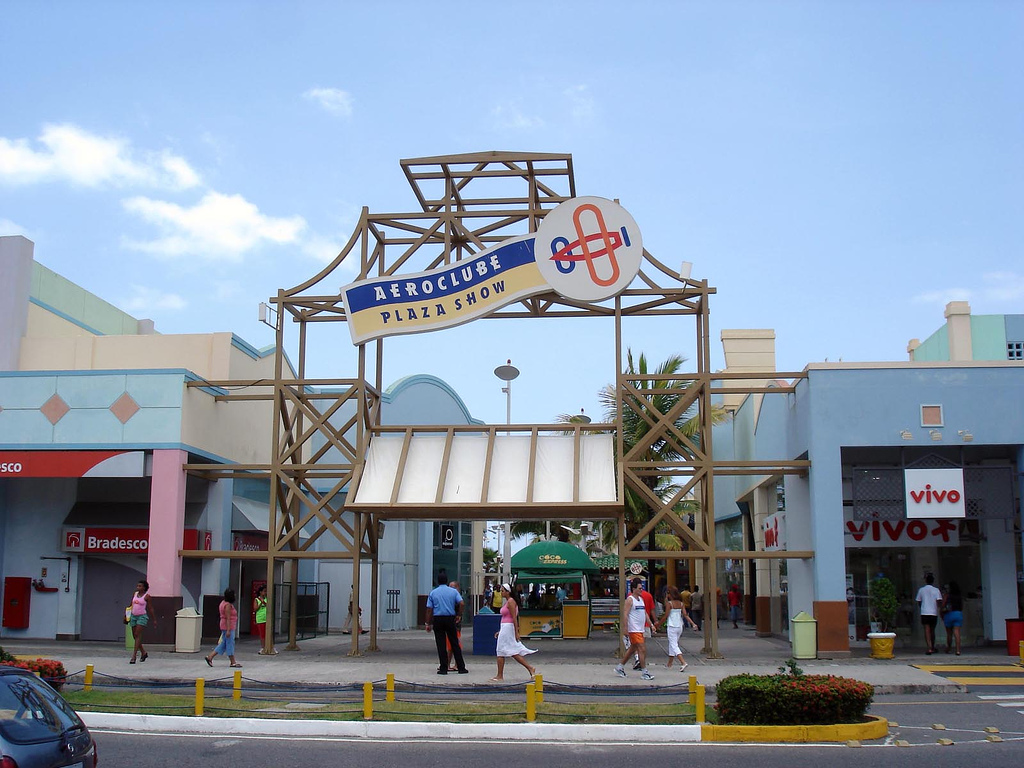
  Facade of Aeroclube Plaza Show in 2005

== Ceará ==
- Shopping Aldeota
- Shopping Avenida
- Shopping Del Paseo
- Shopping Iguatemi Fortaleza
- Shopping RioMar
- Shopping Via Sul
- North Shopping Jóquei

== Distrito Federal ==
- Águas Claras
  - Águas Claras Shopping
  - DF Plaza Shopping (under construction)
  - Shopping Quê!
- Gama
  - Gama Shopping
- Guará
  - Casa Park
  - Park Design
  - Park Shopping Brasília
- Lago Norte
  - Shopping Iguatemi Brasília
- Planaltina
  - Planaltina Shopping (under construction)
- Brasília
  - Boulevard Shopping
  - Brasília Shopping
  - Shopping Conjunto Nacional
  - ParkShopping Brasília
  - Pátio Brasil Shopping
  - Shopping ID
  - Venâncio Shopping (under construction)
- Santa Maria
  - Santa Maria Shopping
- Sobradinho
  - Sobradinho Shopping
- Sudoeste/Octogonal
  - Terraço Shopping
- Taguatinga
  - Alameda Shopping
  - JK Shopping
  - Taguatinga Shopping

== Espírito Santo ==
- Shopping Norte-Sul
- Shopping Praia da Costa
- Shopping Vitória

== Minas Gerais ==
- Betim Shopping
- BH Shopping
- Big Shopping
- Casa Raja Shopping
- Center Shopping Uberlândia
- Complexo Manhattan
- Diamond Mall
- GV Shopping
- Independência Shopping
- Itaú Power Shopping
- Lagoa Shopping Center
- Minas Shopping
- Minascasa
- Minassul Shopping
- Montes Claros Shopping
- P.A. Shopping
- Pampulha Mall
- Pátio Savassi
- Shopping Boulevard
- Shopping Cidade
- Shopping Del Rey
- Shopping Vale do Aço
- Shopping Norte
- Shopping Ponteio
- Shopping Pouso Alegre
- Shopping Santa Cruz
- Shopping Uberaba
- Shopping Vilarinho
- Torre Alta Vila
- Via Shopping PL
- Viashopping

== Pará ==
- Boulevard Shopping Belém
- Castanheira Shopping Center
- Paraíso Shopping Center
- Parque Shopping Belém
- Rio Tapajós Shopping (2013)
- Shopping Bosque Grão Pará (2013)
- Shopping Metrópole (2013)
- Shopping Modelo (2013)
- Shopping Paricá (2013)
- Shopping Pátio Belém
- Shopping Pátio Marabá (Oct. 2012)
- Tucuruí Shopping Center
- Unique Shopping Marabá (2013)
- Unique Shopping Parauapebas
- Yamada Plaza Castanhal

== Paraná ==
- Park Shopping Barigüi – the main stores are Adidas, Tommy Hilfiger, H. Stern, Lacoste, Puma, Nike, Zara, Fnac, L'Occitane, and Calvin Klein Jeans
- Shopping Crystal – the main stores are Montblanc, H. Stern, Natan, Capoani, Gant, Lacoste, L'Occitane, and Calvin Klein Jeans
- Shopping Mueller – shopping centre localized in the centre of Curitiba; the main stores are Zara, H. Stern, Lacoste, Nike, Accessorize, and L'Occitane
- Shopping Pucuru – shopping centre localized in Pucuru; the main stores are Zara, H. Stern

== Pernambuco ==
- Paço Alfândega
- River Shopping
- Shopping Boa Viagem Outlet
- Shopping Boa Vista
- Shopping Caruaru
- Shopping Center Guararapes
- Shopping Center Recife
- Shopping Costa Dourada
- Shopping Difusora
- Shopping Norte
- Shopping Patteo Olinda
- Shopping Paulista North Way
- Shopping Plaza Casa Forte
- Shopping RioMar
- Shopping Tacaruna
- Shopping Familia Gomes da Silva
- Pedro Bó International Centre

== Rio Grande do Norte ==
- Alamanda Mall
- Lagoa Center
- Midway Mall
- Mossoró West Shopping
- Natal Norte Shopping
- Natal Shopping
- Praia Shopping
- SeaWay Shopping
- Shopping 10
- Shopping Cidade Jardim
- Shopping Natal Sul
- Shopping Orla Sul
- Via Direta Shopping Center

== Rio Grande do Sul ==
- Barra Shopping Sul
- Canoas Shopping
- Cristal Shopping
- Moinhos Shopping
- Shopping Praia de Belas

== Rio de Janeiro ==
- Bangu Shopping
- Barra Garden
- Barra Point
- Barra Shopping
- Barra Square Shopping
- Barra World Shopping & Park
- Botafogo Praia Shopping
- Carioca Shopping
- Casa & Gourmet Shopping
- Città America Barra da Tijuca
- Downtown Barra da Tijuca
- Fórum de Ipanema
- Guadalupe Shopping
- Ilha Plaza Shopping
- Madureira Shopping
- New York City Center
- Norte Shopping
- Nova América Outlet Shopping
- Penha Shopping
- Park Jacarepaguá Shopping
- Park Shopping Campo Grande
- Parque Shopping Sulacap
- Quality Shopping
- Recreio Shopping
- Rio Design Center Barra
- Rio Design Center Leblon
- Rio Shopping
- Santa Cruz Shopping
- São Conrado Fashion Mall
- Shopping Boulevard
- Shopping da Gávea
- Shopping Grande Rio
- Shopping Jardim Guadalupe
- Shopping Leblon
- Shopping Nova Iguaçu
- Shopping Novo Leblon
- Shopping Plaza Niterói
- Shopping Rio Sul
- Shopping Tijuca
- Via Brasil Shopping
- Via Parque Shopping
- Village Mall
- West Shopping

== São Paulo ==
- Campinas
  - Galleria Shopping
  - Shopping Iguatemi Campinas
  - Shopping Parque Dom Pedro
- Guarulhos
  - Shopping Internacional
- Riberão Preto
  - Novo Shopping
  - Ribeirão Shopping
  - Shopping Santa Úrsula
- São Carlos
  - Shopping Iguatemi São Carlos
- São Paulo
  - Shopping Analia Franco – luxurious shopping mall in the east
  - Shopping Aricanduva – the largest mall on Latin America; has around 480 000 square meters (5 200 000 square feet)
  - Shopping Bourbon – one of the newest malls in the city; has one of the two IMAX cinemas in the country
  - Shopping Capital – closed in 2012 due to lack of permit and operating license
  - Shopping Center 3 – a gallery-like mall on Paulista Avenue
  - Shopping Center Norte – a one-floor shopping in the city north
  - Shopping Central Plaza
  - Shopping Cidade Jardim – the most luxurious mall in the city, located by the Pinheiros River on Brooklyn region
  - Shopping D&D – focused on decoration and design's located on Brooklyn, next to Shopping Nações Unidas
  - Shopping Eldorado – one of the most classic malls on the city; located in the West
  - Shopping Ibirapuera – among the most traditional shopping centres in the city, it is located near Ibirapuera Park
  - Shopping Iguatemi São Paulo – the first mall in the city and also the first one in Brazil, located on Faria Lima Avenue
  - Shopping Iguatemi JK
  - Shopping Light – in the Centro district, near Gallery of Rock and the Municipal Theater; the building was the past home of the extinct São Paulo Tramway, Light and Power Company
  - Shopping Market Place – Shopping Morumbi's neighbour, it is inspired by an old European train station
  - Shopping Mart Center – closed in 2011
  - Shopping Matarazzo – closed in 2002 and demolished to make way for Shopping Bourbon
  - Shopping Metro Santa Cruz
  - Shopping Metro Tatuape – the first shopping mall in São Paulo with a subway connection
  - Shopping Metrô Tucuruvi
  - Shopping Mooca
  - Shopping Morumbi – one of the most popular malls in the city; has Brazils' best designers plus some international stores like Armani Exchange
  - Shopping Nações Unidas – a very small shopping centre located on Brooklyn region
  - Shopping Pátio Higienópolis – a luxurious mall in the Higienópolis neighborhood
  - Shopping Paulista – an older mall near the end of Paulista Avenue
  - Shopping Plaza Sul
  - Shopping Vila Lobos – a popular mall on West; its architecture is inspired by the international style
  - Shopping Vila Olímpia – a younger luxurious mall on the commercial Vila Olímpia neighborhood
  - Shopping West Plaza
