= Timeline of Brasília =

The following is a timeline of the history of the city of Brasília, Federal District, Brazil.

== 20th century ==
- 1957 – City construction begins.
- 1958 – Palácio da Alvorada built.
- 1960
  - 21 April: Brasília inaugurated.
  - Population: 141,742.
  - Base Hospital of the Federal District and Palácio do Planalto open.
  - Correio Braziliense newspaper begins publication.
  - Catholic Diocese of Brasília established.
- 1961 – University of Brasília established.
- 1966 – Martins Pena Theater opens.
- 1967 – Brasilia TV Tower erected.
- 1970
  - Cathedral of Brasília and Itamaraty Palace inaugurated.
  - Population: 272,002.
- 1971
  - Conjunto Nacional shopping mall in business.
  - Brasília Airport terminal built.
- 1972 – Jornal de Brasília newspaper begins publication.
- 1973 – Nilson Nelson Gymnasium built.
- 1974 – Estádio Nacional Mané Garrincha (stadium) and Brasília Autodrome open.
- 1975 – Brasília FC (football club) formed.
- 1977 – Palácio do Jaburu inaugurated.
- 1978 – Hospital Daher founded.
- 1980 – Population: 1,203,333.
- 1983 – ParkShopping mall in business.
- 1986 – City joins the União das Cidades Capitais Luso-Afro-Américo-Asiáticas.
- 1991 – Population: 1,598,415.
- 1997 – August: Squatter unrest.
- 1999 – Centro de Futebol Zico de Brasília Sociedade Esportiva (football team) formed.
- 2000
  - Population: 2,043,169.
  - Centro Cultural Banco do Brasil opens.

== 21st century ==
- 2001 – Federal District Metro begins operating.
- 2002 – Juscelino Kubitschek bridge built.
- 2006
  - Cultural Complex of the Republic inaugurated.
  - Legião FC (football team) formed.
- 2007 – Chico Mendes Institute for Biodiversity Conservation headquartered in Brasília.
- 2010
  - April: International 2nd BRIC summit held in city.
  - Population: 2,570,160.
- 2012 – Brasília Digital TV Tower erected.
