= Conjunto Nacional =

Conjunto Nacional may refer to:

- Conjunto Nacional (Brasília), a shopping mall in Brasília, Brazil
- Conjunto Nacional (São Paulo), a shopping mall in São Paulo, Brazil
