= List of theatres in Natal, Rio Grande do Norte =

This is a list of theatres in Natal, Rio Grande do Norte, Brazil.

== List ==
Name	Address	Opened	Seats	Use	Notes
Alberto Maranhão Theatre	Praça Augusto Severo, Ribeira	1904	323	theatre	
Casa da Ribeira	R. Frei Miguelinho, Ribeira	2001	164	theatre, comedy, concerts	
Teatro de Cultura Popular Chico Daniel	R. Jundiaí, Petrópolis	2005	200	theatre, comedy, concerts	
Teatro Municipal Sandoval Wanderley	Av. Pres. Bandeira, Alecrim	1962	150	theatre	
Teatro Riachuelo	Midway Mall, Tirol	2010	1500	theatre, comedy, concerts, conferences	
