= Morumbi Shopping shooting =

1999 mass shooting in São Paulo, Brazil

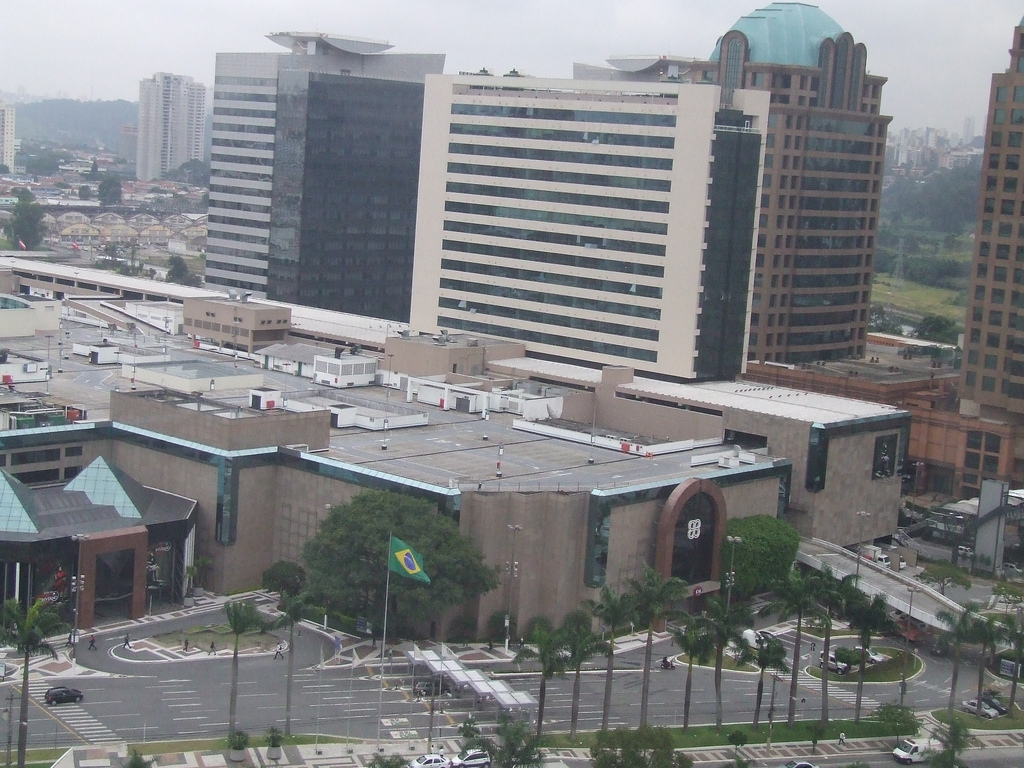
- Morumbi Shopping, where the shooting took place
- Location: 23.6234°S 46.6989°W; Avenida Roque Petroni Júnior, 1089, Vila Cordeiro, São Paulo, São Paulo, Brazil
- Date: November 3, 1999; 26 years ago c. 10:25 p.m. (UTC-3)
- Target: Visitors at the theater
- Attack type: Mass shooting, mass murder, arson
- Weapon: 9mm MAC-11 submachine gun
- Deaths: 3
- Injuries: 4
- Perpetrator: Mateus da Costa Meira
- Defender: Domingo Arjones

On November 3, 1999, a mass shooting occurred inside a movie theater at the Morumbi shopping mall in São Paulo, Brazil. The perpetrator, Mateus da Costa Meira, then a 24-year-old medical student, killed three people and injured four others inside the theater.

Meira was initially sentenced to 120 years in prison, a term that was later reduced to 48 years. After attempting to kill another prison inmate, he was deemed mentally unfit in 2011 and moved to a psychiatric hospital, where he remained until his release in 2024. He is known in Brazil as the "shopping mall shooter" or the "cinema shooter".

== Shooting ==
The shooting occurred in theater 5 of the mall's movie theater, which was showing the film Fight Club. At around 10:10 p.m., approximately 55 minutes into the film, Meira entered the theater and watched the film for approximately 15 minutes. He then went to the toilet, where he shot the mirror with his submachine gun. He then returned to the theater, stood in front of the screen, and shot to the ceiling, but that did not scare viewers since they believed it was an effect from the movie. He then shot against one of the walls, causing frightened viewers to hide behind seats. He subsequently aimed and shot at the audience, killing three people. He was then subdued and stopped by a group of viewers as he tried to reload the gun. The shooting lasted about 3 minutes.

== Casualties ==
One victim died at the scene and two more in local hospitals.

- Hermè Luisa Jatobá Vadasz, 46 years old, an employee at the Young & Rubican publicity agency. Her heart was donated to a patient at a local public hospital.
- Fabiana Lobão Freitas, 25 years old, a photographer who worked at the Museum of Contemporary Art of the University of São Paulo. She was watching the film with her boyfriend, film producer Carlos Eduardo Porto de Oliveira (26 years old), who was injured in the shootout.
- Júlio Maurício Zemaitis, 29 years old, economist.

== Perpetrator ==
Mateus da Costa Meira
- Born: Mateus da Costa Meira; April 4, 1975 (age 51); Salvador, Brazil
- Status: Released
- Motive: Mental issues
- Conviction: First-degree murder
- Penalty: Originally sentenced to 120 years in prison, later reduced to 48 years on appeal

Details
- Victims: Fabiana Lobão Freitas, Júlio Maurício Zemaitis and Hermè Luisa Jatobá Vadasz
- Date: November 3, 1999
- Country: Brazil
- State: São Paulo
- Location: São Paulo

In November 1999, Mateus da Costa Meira (born April 4, 1975) lived alone in an apartment in São Paulo and studied medicine at the Faculty of Medical Sciences of São Paulo's Holy House (FCMSCSP), a well-regarded institution; he was in his sixth and last year, only 15 days from graduating.

His wealthy family (including his father, a doctor) lived in Salvador, his hometown, and Mateus regularly received money from his parents in order to live a comfortable life. He played "violent" video games (particularly Duke Nukem 3D) and owned a vast collection of illegally-copied software. He was known to send viruses and pornography to users of internet provider Magiclink in Salvador since January 1997.

He was described as shy, introverted and apathetic and had a poor academic performance. He has schizoid personality disorder. After refusing to do mandatory work at the medical school, he was sent to the institution's psychology division. By other sources, however, he was described as a gentle, calm person who changed his personality months before the attack and started to skip classes and get closer to drug traffickers.

Prior to the massacre, he already owned a pistol, but chose to obtain a more powerful weapon: a MAC-11 submachine gun, which he acquired illegally from Marcos Paulo Almeida dos Santos for R$ 5,000. Meira said he employed Santos as a driver since he did not know how to drive the manual car his insurance company gave him following a crash that destroyed his automatic Chrysler Neon.

The police also investigated him for two additional crimes: drug possession and CD falsification. In his apartment, they found equipment for CD piracy, cocaine, crack and ammunition.

Meira told the police that he had been planning the attack for seven years and that he chose Fight Club because the main character has schizophrenia. He then became known in the country as the "shopping mall shooter" or the "cinema shooter".

=== Trial and sentence ===
Caught in the act, Meira was sentenced to 120 1/2 years in prison. His defenders alleged that he was only semi-imputable because of his mental issues. His sentence was later reduced to 48 years and 9 months by the State Court of São Paulo.

He stayed at Carandiru Penitentiary until its deactivation in 2002 and was then moved to a penitentiary in Tremembé. In 2009, he was moved to a penitentiary in Salvador, his home town, following requests by his family.

On May 8, 2009, Meira tried to kill a cellmate, the 68-year-old Spaniard Francisco Vidal Lopes, with scissors, apparently because the television's volume was too loud. He was put on trial but was absolved later in 2011 since he was not considered imputable anymore due to his mental diagnosis. It was decided that he had to be moved to the Hospital of Treatment and Custody (HCT) in Salvador, where he remained until his release in 2024.

== Aftermath ==
Theater 5, where the shooting occurred, was permanently closed. The mall closed its remaining theaters in 2012, freeing up space for new stores at the mall.

== See also ==
- Terrorism in Brazil
- 1989 Harlem Nights movie theater shooting - Detroit suburban theater shooting that occurred simultaneous to a shooting scene in the film
- 2012 Aurora, Colorado shooting - theater shooting in Aurora, Colorado, that occurred during the screening of the film The Dark Knight Rises
- 2015 Lafayette shooting - theater shooting in Lafayette, Louisiana, that occurred during the screening of the film Trainwreck
