= Hans Stern =

Brazilian jeweler (1922–2007)

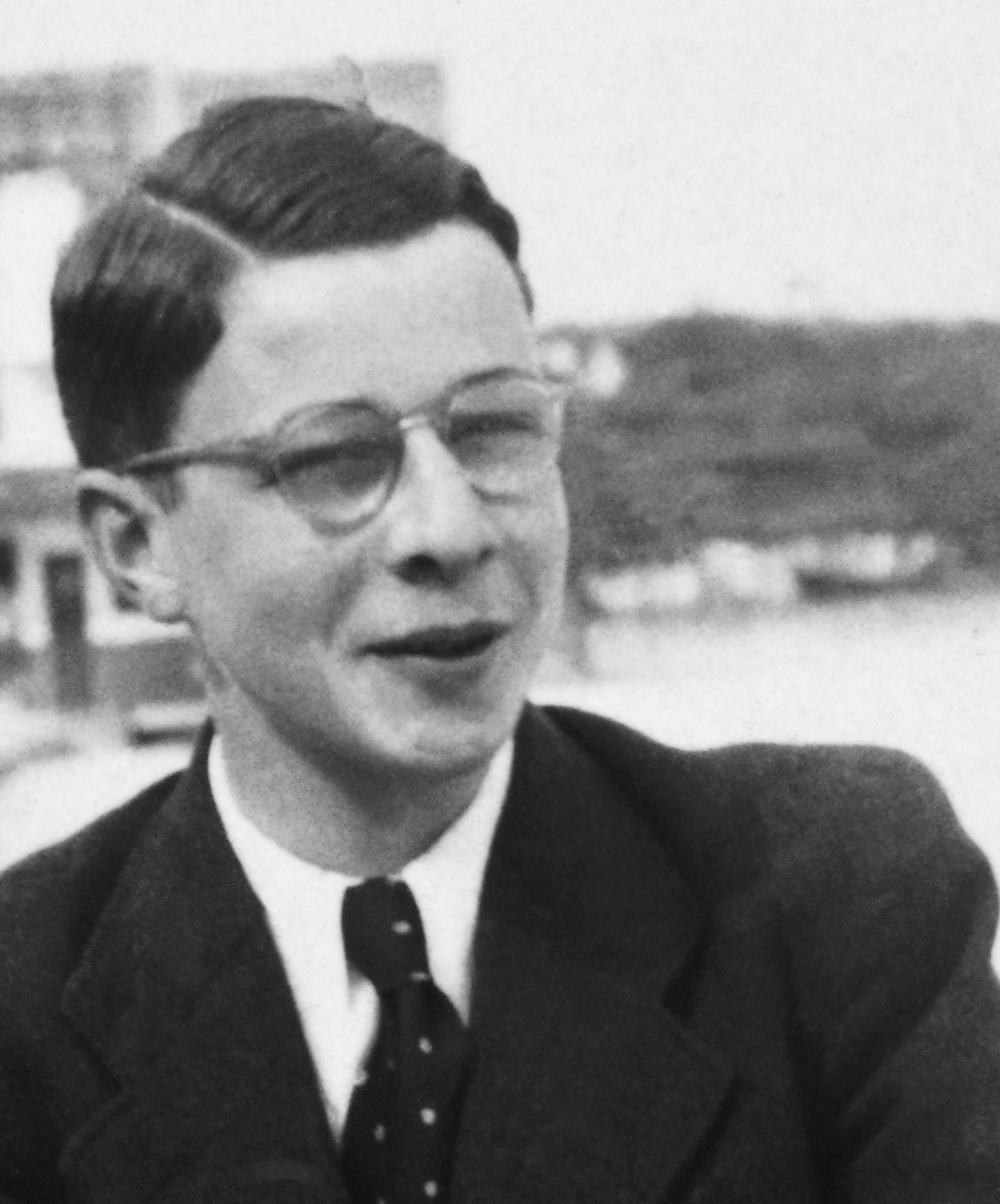
Hans Stern upon arrival in Rio de Janeiro, Brazil

Hans Stern (October 1, 1922 – October 26, 2007) was a Brazilian jeweler and businessman. He was dubbed the "king of the colored gems" by The New York Times and acclaimed by the international media. Founder of world-renowned luxury jewelry brand H.Stern.

== Early life ==
Stern was born in Essen, Germany, on October 1, 1922, to a Jewish family. He immigrated from Germany to Brazil at the outbreak of World War II, a couple of years prior to the Holocaust, at the age of 17.

== Career ==
Stern started his career in the gemstone industry when he began working at the Rio de Janeiro-based company, Cristab, which exports precious stones and minerals from Brazil. Stern traveled to Minas Gerais state as part of his job, where he came to know the local miners. He also became familiarized with many of the precious stones that were mined in the area, including topazes, tourmalines and amethysts. He became fascinated by the vibrant gems of Brazil and decided to promote them internationally, targeting foreign travelers. In doing so, he gave birth to a new industry.

Stern founded his company, H. Stern, in 1945, in order to market Brazilian gems There was no real market for Brazilian gemstones at the time. His company would eventually grow into a multinational jewelry empire. Stern and his company trained a large number of young Brazilian jewelers as H. Stern gained customers and market credibility. His work propelled the Brazilian jeweler industry up to international standards. Stern was also the first to create a worldwide warranty certificate, and to offer tours of his workshops to present the creative and production process with integrity and transparency. One of his main goals in life was achieved when important international gemological institutes revised the old "semi-precious" definition of colored stones and began referring to them since as "precious colored stones". Stern coined the phrase, "There is no semi-precious stone as there is no semi-pregnant woman or semi-honest man".

Stern's company, H. Stern, grew into a retail chain of more than 160 stores throughout the world. The first international boutiques appeared in Frankfurt, Lisbon and New York City in the 1970s. For many decades the company focused its creations on Hans' beloved colored gems, although Stern also won several Diamonds International Awards and other prizes for avant garde diamond designs.

Always a visionary, Stern led the business to another phase of international expansion by entering in the Basel Jewelry and Watch Fair in Basel, Switzerland, in 2003 for the first time. From the jewelry and watch fair, he was able to establish a growing network of contacts and partnerships throughout Europe, the United States and the Middle East adding another 150 points of sale to the network, through retail partnerships with department stores and specialty retailers.

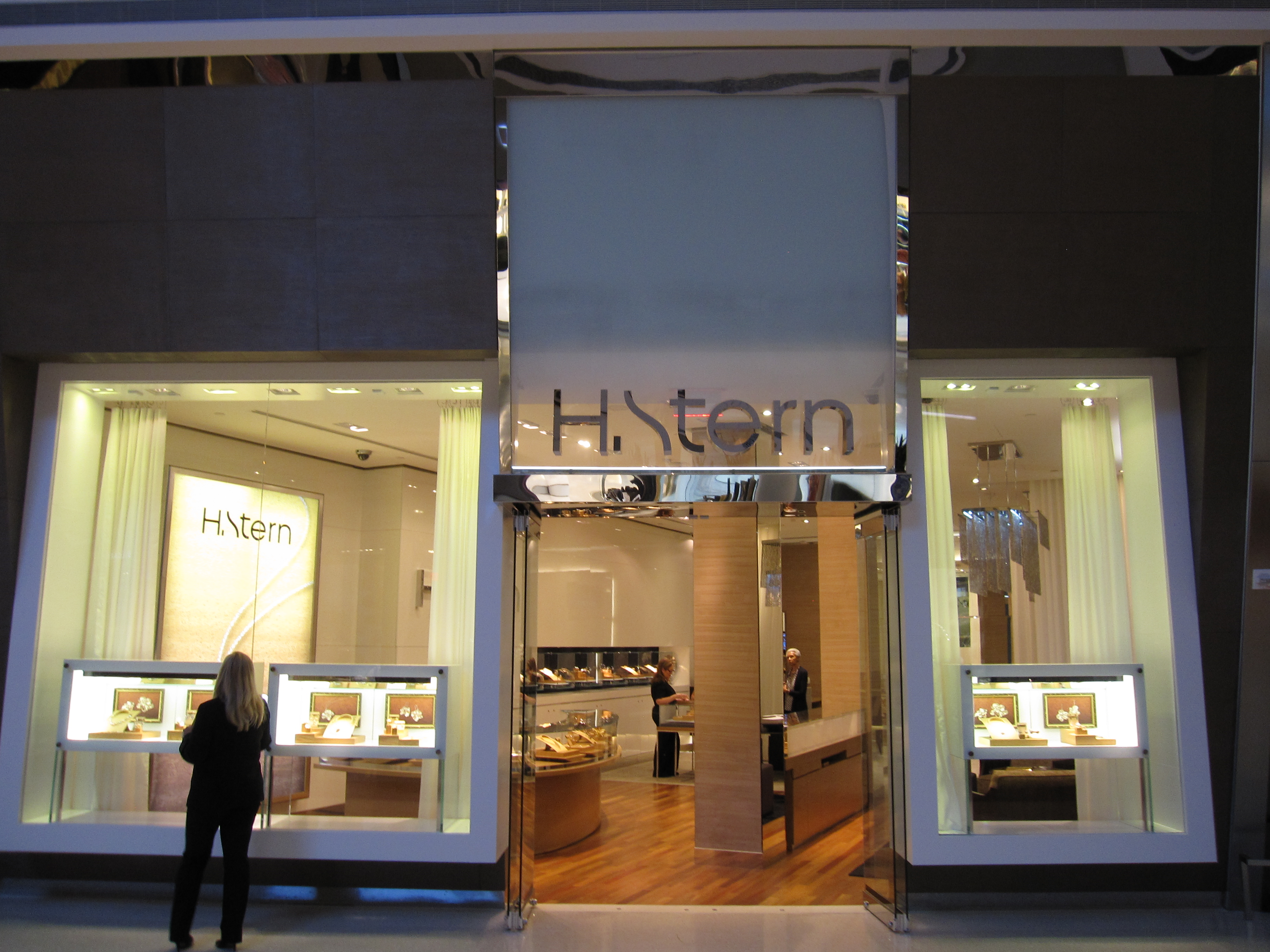
H. Stern boutique in The Crystals (Las Vegas)

As of late 2007, there are now 160 stores which are family owned and operated in 13 countries, and 150 shop in shops in another 19 countries Hans' jewelry and gemstones have been featured in a number of international fashion magazines, such as Vogue, Marie Claire and Elle. His gems are often worn by celebrities. The H. Stern jewelry line is also now sold in upscale stores in cities as far away from Brazil as Frankfurt, New York City, Paris, Moscow, Mexico City, and Tel Aviv.

Stern's favorite gemstone was the tourmaline, a stone which is commonly found throughout Minas Gerais.

== Death ==
Hans Stern died on October 26, 2007, in Rio de Janeiro at age 85. Stern had been hospitalized for days before his death. He was survived by his wife, Ruth, whom he married in 1958. Together the couple had four sons - Roberto, Ricardo, Ronaldo and Rafael.
