= Iguatemi São Paulo =

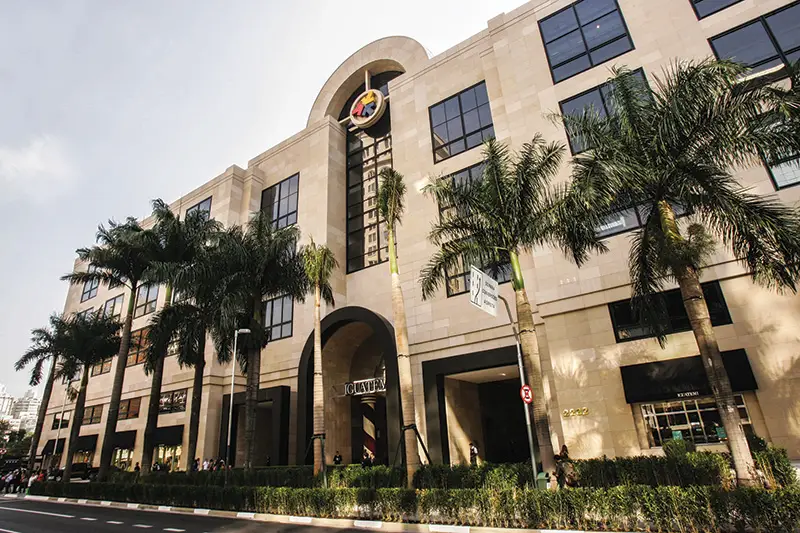
- Iguatemi São Paulo
- Location: São Paulo, Brazil
- Coordinates: 23°34′37.23″S 46°41′17.09″W
- Address: Brigadeiro Faria Lima Avenue, 2232
- Opened: November 28, 1966
- Owner: Iguatemi Empresa de Shopping Centers S.A.
- Num. of stores: 330
- Floor area: 49,367 m^{2} (531,380 sq ft)
- Parking: 1,824 vacancies
- Website: www.iguatemisaopaulo.com.br

The Iguatemi São Paulo shopping centre is the oldest Brazilian mall in operation. Located on Brigadeiro Faria Lima Avenue, in the Jardins neighbourhood, the shopping mall was opened in November 28, 1966.

== See also ==
- List of shopping centers in Brazil
- Retail apocalypse
