= History of Brasília =

History of Brazil's capital city

Brasília, the capital city of Brazil located in the nation's Federal District, has a history beginning in the colonial era and interactions with the native inhabitants of the area. The first propositions of relocating Brazil's capital began in the late 18th century, and after various plans and attempts at settlement, the city was inaugurated on 21 April 1960 following a nearly four-year construction period. Since its inauguration, the city has faced economic, social and political challenges and has seen vast population growth and spreading urbanisation. Since the end of the 20th century, however, Brasília has become an important cultural hub through contributions of music, art and literature.

== Early history ==
The area where Brasília was established within the State of Goias had a long history of Indigenous inhabitance and held importance during the colonial era. The State of Goias was originally designated as a Captaincy of the Viceroyalty of Brazil, two administrative designations that were used in the Portuguese Empire. The state gained its name from the Goia people, who lived centrally within the Captaincy, and were subject to colonial expansion in the 17th and 18th centuries, leading to their assimilation and decline.

There was no direct precursor city to Brasília as it was established in part of the savannah of Brazil's central plateau. There were, however, several significant settlements in the vicinity, such as Luziânia, then named Santa Luzia, which was established in the 1740s and became a successful mining town.

== Settlement ==
The first propositions of moving Brazil's capital city from Rio de Janeiro came in 1798 from the Inconfidência Mineira, a separatist political movement that existed during the colonial period of Brazil. The movement's leader, Joaquim José da Silva Xavier, known as Tiradentes, had planned to establish a new capital for an independent Brazil in the city of São João del-Rei, located within the province of Minas Gerais. Tiradentes was hanged on April 21, 1792, which led to the collapse of the Inconfidência Mineira and, for a significant time, the movement for a new location for the capital city.

The modern location of the Federal District, first outlined by Cruls and consolidated by José Pessoa

=== Later attempts and the site of Brasília ===
In 1822, the Brazilian statesman José Bonifácio de Andrada e Silva wrote the "Memoir on the Necessity and Means of Building a New Capital in the Interior of Brazil", which became the first official plan for Brasília as the nation's new capital city. In the document, Bonifácio suggested creating the capital in the Brazilian state of Goias at a latitude of approximately 15 degrees. Despite the similarity of these preliminary plans to the current location of the settlement, Bonifácio faced exile and his plans did not progress. This characterised many of the plans for the site of a new capital that were proposed during Brazil's period as an Empire.

It was not until the first republic was declared in 1889 that the plans progressed further, with a statement in the new constitution urging the movement of the capital to an interior location, aiming to lessen the economic and social reliance on Rio de Janeiro and the South-East of Brazil. A council led by Luís Cruls broadly outlined the boundaries of a new federal district in 1892, which was later narrowed down by a federal commission led by José Pessoa in 1955. The final commission made the designation of a 5850 square kilometre province for the new capital within the original space outlined by Cruls, an area and size which has largely remained the same since. Between these commissions, plans for Brasília's creation were seen in federal laws in 1922 and mentioned in the constitution of 1946. The final designation prompted the beginning of the city's construction, which occurred under the presidency of Juscelino Kubitschek.

== Construction ==
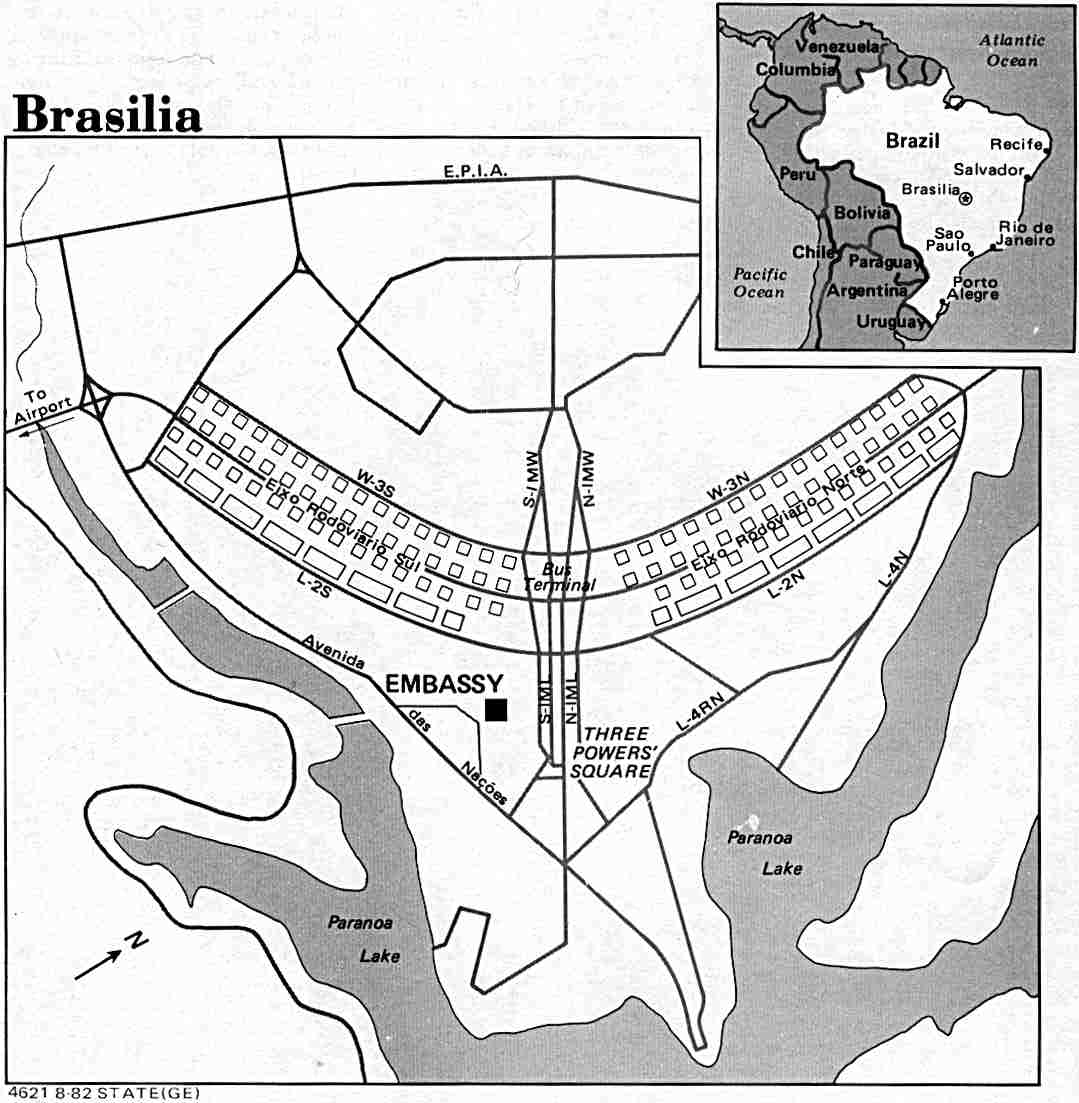
Part of Lúcio Costa's pilot plan for Brasília's design

The construction of Brasília was one of the core initiatives of President Kubitschek's “Fifty Years in Five” program, a centrepiece of his administration's focus on development. Launched in 1956, the program aimed for industrialisation and urbanisation on a wide scale in order to achieve large economic gains. It focused on the local economies of São Paulo and Rio de Janeiro, and sought to ease the burdens on these areas with the interior relocation of the capital.

Lúcio Costa became the lead urban planner in 1957 with a successful pilot plan. He worked alongside Oscar Niemeyer, a colleague who was approved of by President Kubitschek, and Roberto Burle Marx, a landscape designer. The first building commissioned and completed was the Alvorada Palace, the official residence for the President of Brazil, which was followed by other key administrative buildings. Following this, construction expanded to include public offices, airports and a vast series of road networks connecting Brasília to other provincial capitals around the nation, along which infrastructure including motels and warehouses were established. The designs within Brasília followed a modernist and futurist architectural style, for which Niemeyer was particularly known, and its residential areas were designed to accommodate 500,000 citizens, a goal that was reached by 1970. The construction period ultimately lasted 41 months, from 1956 to April 21, 1960, the date of Brasília's inauguration.

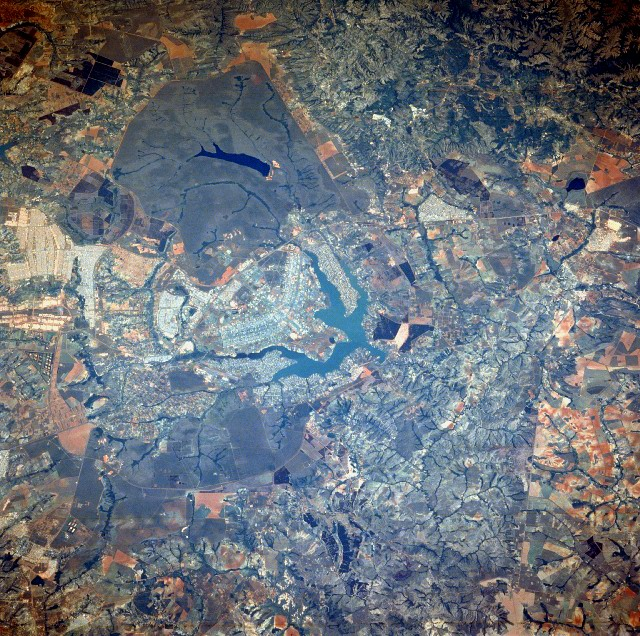
Satellite view, November 1990

The company leading the development of Brasília was NOVACAP; a portmanteau of 'New Capital', which was headquartered roughly two kilometers from the initial site in a work camp that eventually came to be known as Velhacap (Old Capital). Similar work camps spawned throughout the construction period due to the large influx of domestic and international migrant workers, driven in part by the vast publicity the city received. Nearby Velhacap was Candangolândia, and other smaller settlements arose in gaps left by the pilot plan. Many of these construction camps became internal communities, with food provided in mess halls to workers who lived in residences similar to barracks. These communities went on to form the basis of the many satellite cities in the Federal District, as seen in the current status of Candangolândia as an administrative region.

=== Economic repercussions ===
The total cost of the construction of Brasília was estimated to be US$1.5 Billion (unadjusted from 1954 dollars) by President Café Filho. Subsequent administrations have generally been unsure about the total costs, with general estimates regarding it as one of the world's most expensive development projects. The high expenses of the project diverted taxes into the city from around the country, which caused the emergence of an urban/rural divide in the Brasília area, and prompted population growth due to an influx of rural inhabitants moving to urban areas for social and economic opportunities. 27 satellite cities have grown on the outskirts of Brasília, fed by urbanisation and the high concentration of office workers in the city prompting lower income earners to live outside and commute in.

The vast expenditure on the construction of Brasília also impacted the wider Brazilian economy. After the beginning of the Fourth Brazilian Republic in 1946, the national economy grew significantly through a method of import substitution industrialization which initially relied on large foreign investments to drive industry. This economic approach created national debt which was significantly worsened by the construction of Brasília, leading to increased inflation and a drop in GDP growth (7% to 4%) and industry growth (9% to 3.9%). The lack of adequate financing for the city's construction became a prolonged issue in successive governments following President Kubitschek's administration and the 1964 coup d'état, and has been named as a contributor to hyperinflation and recession in the 1980s. Kubitschek's “Fifty Years in Five” program fell under wide criticism following his presidency, with critics, newspapers and academics often describing it as “fifty years’ inflation in five.”

=== Social impacts ===
Brasília held the status of a national pride during its construction and after its inauguration, much of which focused on the architectural identity of the city. Dr Steffen Lehmann, an academic from the University of Nevada, Las Vegas, explains this by saying, “At this time, Brasília was seen as a modern utopia that expressed optimism and trust in the future.” This led to the creation of venerative documents such as the Ode to Brasília by Alberto Bonfim; “A pioneer city is rising architecturally bold, the first of its kind in this new urban mould.” Its placement in the interior of the country was chosen to bring about social change by creating a stronger physical connection between the regions and the government, and thus a clearer national identity.

== Early years ==
=== Cultural development ===
The University of Brasília was officially opened in 1962 by founders Darcy Ribeiro, an anthropologist, and Anísio Teixeira, an educator. Oscar Niemeyer designed the main campus building for the university, nicknamed Minhoção or 'Big Worm', which completed construction in 1971. The university shared a goal similar to the social aim of constructing Brasília, "to renew the methods of learning and to teach towards the future." The university contributed greatly to the cultural development of the city and a focus on the arts. In 1962, the Central Institute of the Arts was opened by Alcides da Rocha Miranda, which led to a greater presence of art academics in the Brasília.

It was in this same time period that the first literary works from the city were being published and gaining traction, with the first literary anthologies, Poetas de Brasília and Contistas de Brasília, released in 1962 and 1964 respectively. In 1965 the first 'Brasília Festival of Brazilian Film' was held, and is today one of the oldest and largest film festivals in Brazil.

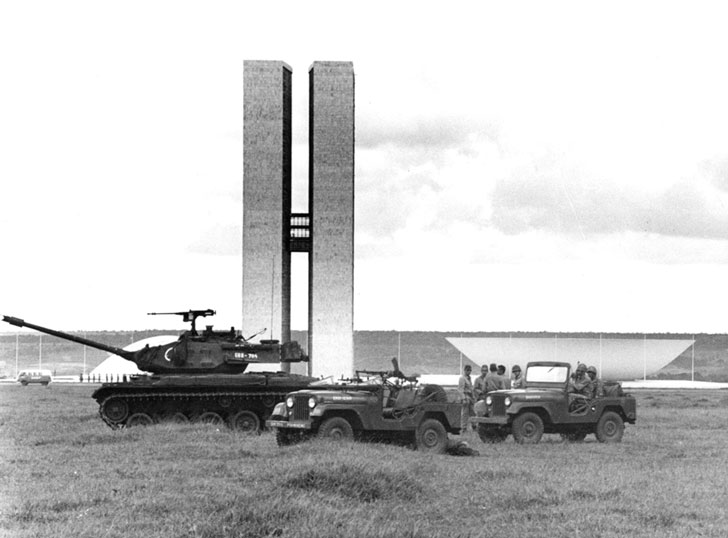
A tank and two Brazilian Army jeeps near the National Congress in Brasília during the 1964 Coup

=== Changing political status ===
Brazil underwent significant changes from 1964 onwards, when a military coup d'état ousted then president João Goulart due to economic and social crises. Goulart's left leaning policies were particularly attacked in the face of inflation nearing 80% annually, a large amount of which was attributable to Kubitschek's presidency and the vast deficit expenditure on Brasília. The coup was centred in Brasília, which significantly damaged the city's social identity as a futuristic and optimistic symbol of national pride.

A process of re-democratisation began in the 1980s which was officially formalised in the drafting of a new constitution in 1988. The new constitution redefined the political rights of the Federal District, and Brasília within, by giving it more political independence and less direct reliance on the Federal government. Article 32 of the constitution outlines that the Federal District is given the same rights as all other states and municipalities including the election of a Governor and Vice-Governor, whilst maintaining that it is not to be further divided into municipalities. Since the constitution the district has had the unique simultaneous definition as a state and municipality of Brazil.

== Modern era ==
Since the end of Brazil's military government in the 1980s, Brasília has been a cultural hub, especially for music. Numerous rock, punk and grunge bands formed and began more readily releasing music in the freer cultural climate, inspired by similar musical movements in the US and UK. Legião Urbana was one of the most famous groups, who released their first album in 1985. They were recognised by Rolling Stone for their song, 'Que país é este?' and their lead singer Renata Russo. The rise of these groups was credited with beginning to shift the identity of Brasília away from its complicated political history and towards the arts.

== See also ==
- Timeline of Brasília
- History of the city of São Paulo
