= Moviecom =

Brazilian cinema chain

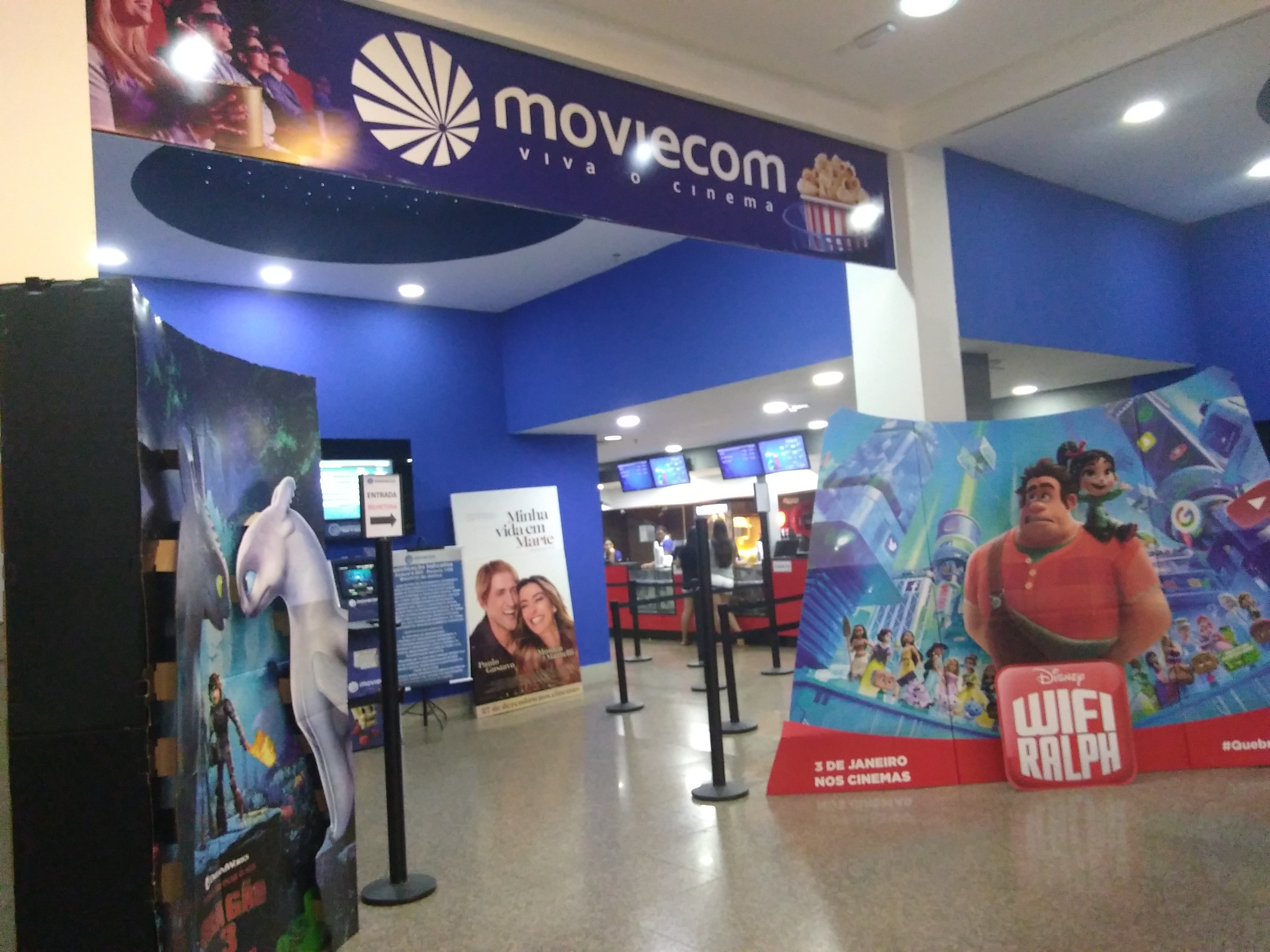
External and internal areas of the Moviecom Shopping Passeio cinema, located in the Shopping Passeio in the city of São Luís.

Moviecom is one of the biggest cinema chain in Brazil. It has 82 theaters located in 16 cities in six different states.

== Screens ==
Name	Mall	Established	No. of screens	Seating	City
Moviecom Buriti	Shopping Buriti		6		Aparecida de Goiânia
Moviecom Conquista Sul			3		Vitória da Conquista
Moviecom Vale do Aço	Shopping do Vale		3		Ipatinga
Moviecom Montes Claros	Montes Claros Shopping Center		3		Montes Claros
Moviecom Praia Shopping	Praia Shopping		7		Natal
Moviecom Jaraguá	Shopping Jaraguá		4		Araraquara
Moviecom Unimart			4		Campinas
Moviecom Franca	Franca Shopping		4		Franca
Moviecom Jaú	Shopping Jaú		2		Jaú
Moviecom Maxi	Maxi Shopping		7		Jundiaí
Moviecom PrudenShopping	PrudenShopping		4		Presidente Prudente
Moviecom Tivoli			4		Santa Bárbara d'Oeste
Moviecom Boavista	Shopping Boa Vista		5		São Paulo
Moviecom Penha	Shopping Penha		6		São Paulo
Moviecom Taubaté	Taubaté Shopping Center		4		Taubaté
Moviecom Pátio Belém			5		Belém
Moviecom Castanheira	Shopping Center Castanheira		7		Belém
