= H. Stern =

Jewellery chain store (1945)

- Type: Privately held company
- Industry: Jewelers
- Founded: 1945
- Founder: Hans Stern
- Headquarters: Rio de Janeiro, RJ, Brazil
- Key people: Gabriel Rodrigues (CEO)
- Products: Precious stones, Watches, Jewelry,
- Owner: Hans Stern
- Website: www.hstern.com.br

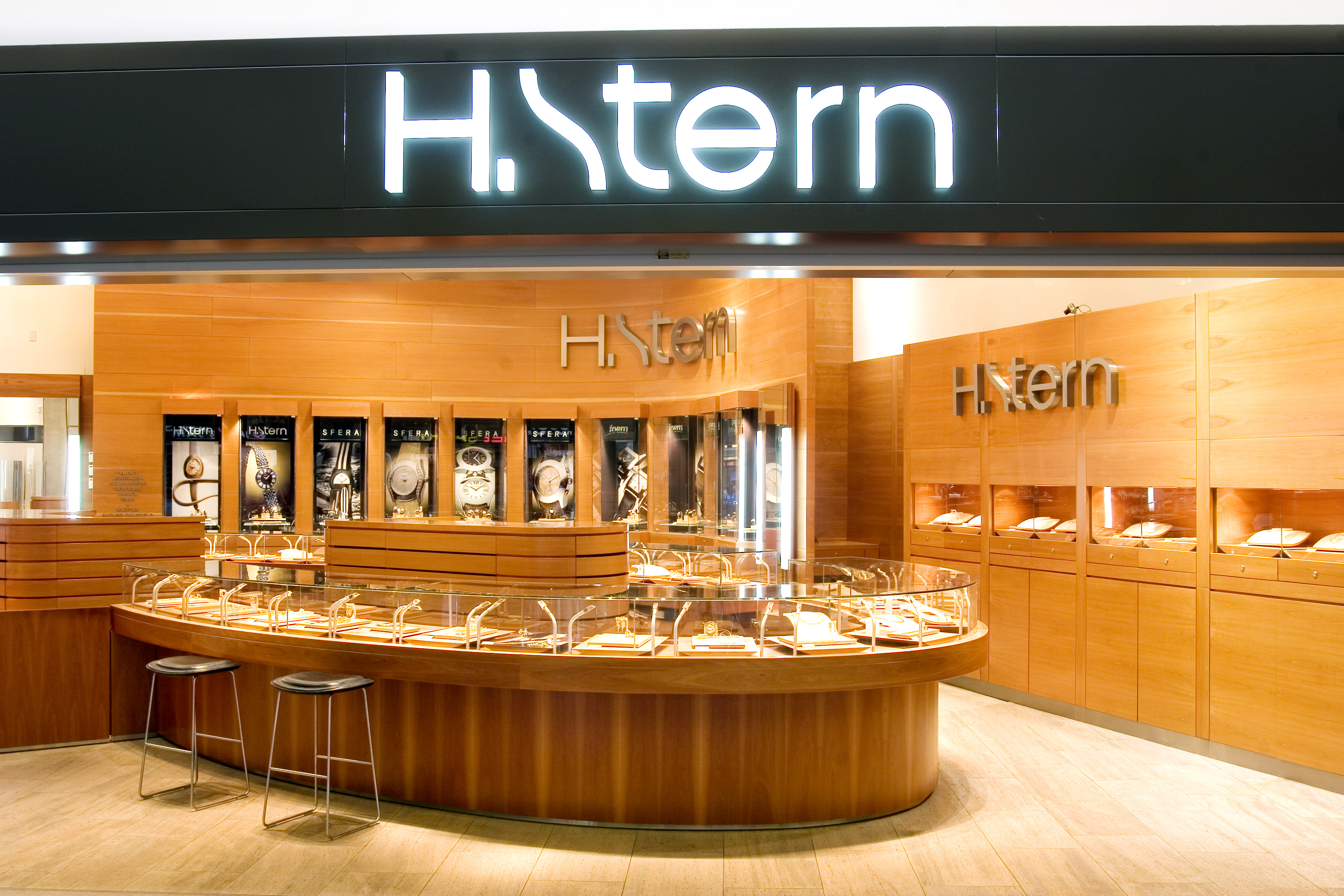
H. Stern shop at Ben Gurion Airport, Israel

H. Stern is a Brazilian luxury jewellery house headquartered in Rio de Janeiro, from where the handmade production of all its jewellery is controlled. The house was founded in 1945 by German-Jewish immigrant Hans Stern. H. Stern initially specialized in precious stones before moving to design focused jewelry. Its first store opened on the Rio de Janeiro docks in 1949, the point of arrival for international passengers on cruise ships. The family owned company does not disclose its sales but it has over 150 stores, located in Latin America, United States, Europe & Asia.

In the 1990s, under the direction of Hans’ eldest son Roberto Stern, currently the President and Creative Director of the company, H. Stern went through an extensive restructuring process. In the product development area, the company started to observe and interpret behavioral, style and fashion trends, and launched collections inspired by several celebrities such as musician Carlinhos Brown (1999), artist Anna Bella Geiger (2000), the stylist and cultural icon Diane von Fürstenberg (2004), architect Oscar Niemeyer and the Grupo Corpo dance company from the state of Minas in Brazil (2009). One of the latest is a collection of rings inspired by the Disney and Tim Burton film Alice in Wonderland.

Eva Longoria, Rihanna, Angelina Jolie, Cate Blanchett, Sharon Stone and Catherine Zeta-Jones have all worn H. Stern's designs.
