= Shopping Vale do Aço =

Shopping center in Ipatinga, MG, Brazil

Steel Valley Mall
- Shopping Vale do Aço

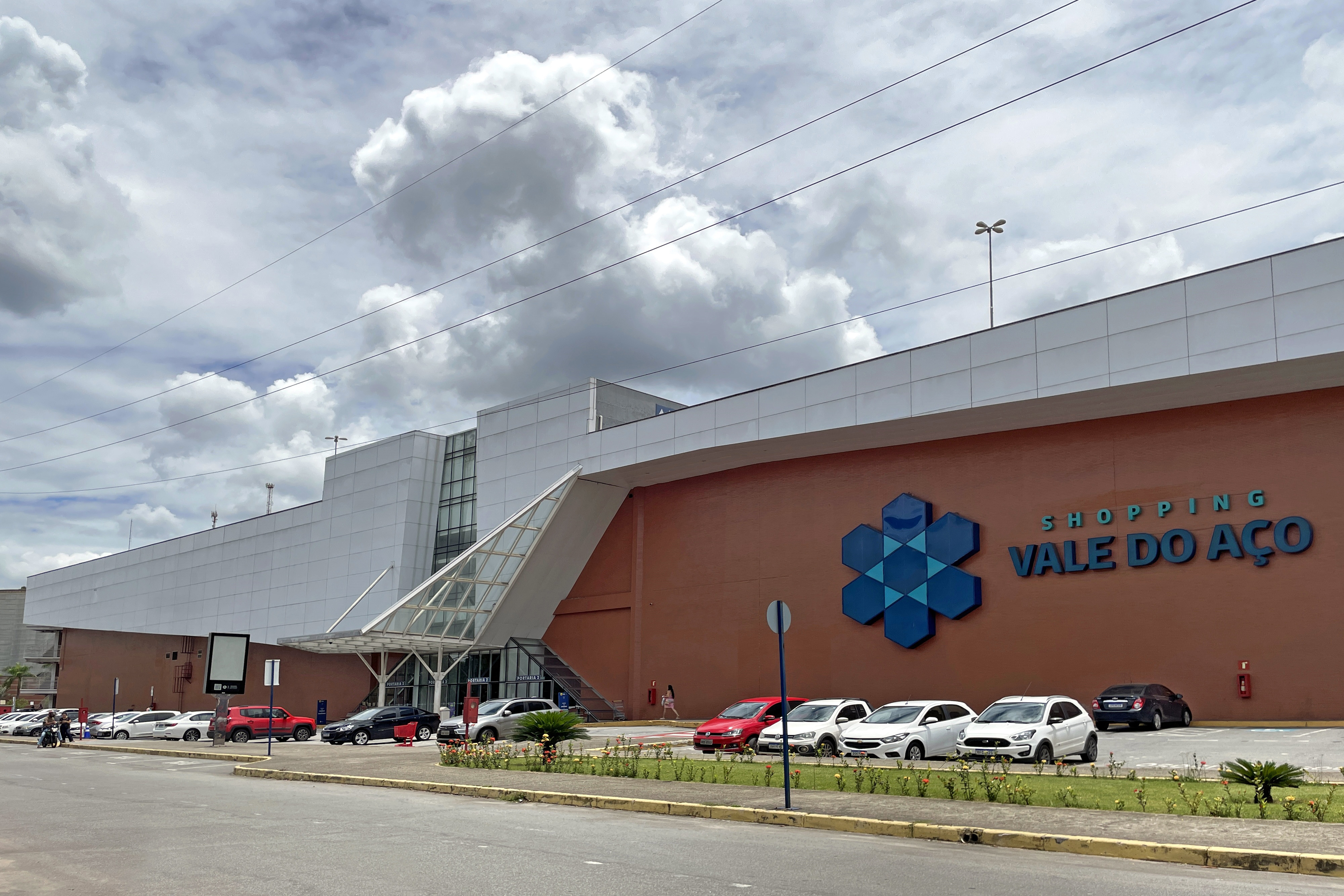
- Partial view of Shopping Vale do Aço
- Location: Ipatinga, Minas Gerais, Brazil
- Coordinates: 19°29′47.24″S 42°33′54.24″W
- Opened: 24 September 1998
- Owner: Intermall Empreendimentos e Participações
- Num. of stores: 300
- Floor area: 86 thousand ft^{2} (8.0 thousand m^{2})
- Floors: 2
- Parking: 1800
- Website: www.shoppingvaledoaco.com.br

Shopping Vale do Aço, also known as Shopping do Vale, is a shopping mall located in the Brazilian municipality of Ipatinga, in the state of Minas Gerais. The development was inaugurated on September 24, 1998, and is owned by Intermall Empreendimentos e Participações, configuring itself as the largest shopping center in the Vale do Aço Metropolitan Area and eastern Minas Gerais. It is among the largest in the state's countryside.

In addition to its commercial importance, the shopping center is considered the largest leisure and entertainment facility in the Vale do Aço Metropolitan Area, its movie theater being the most relevant one in the region. According to SEBRAE, it is among the most recommended attractions to travelers by businessmen and professionals who receive business tourists in the Vale do Aço.

== History ==
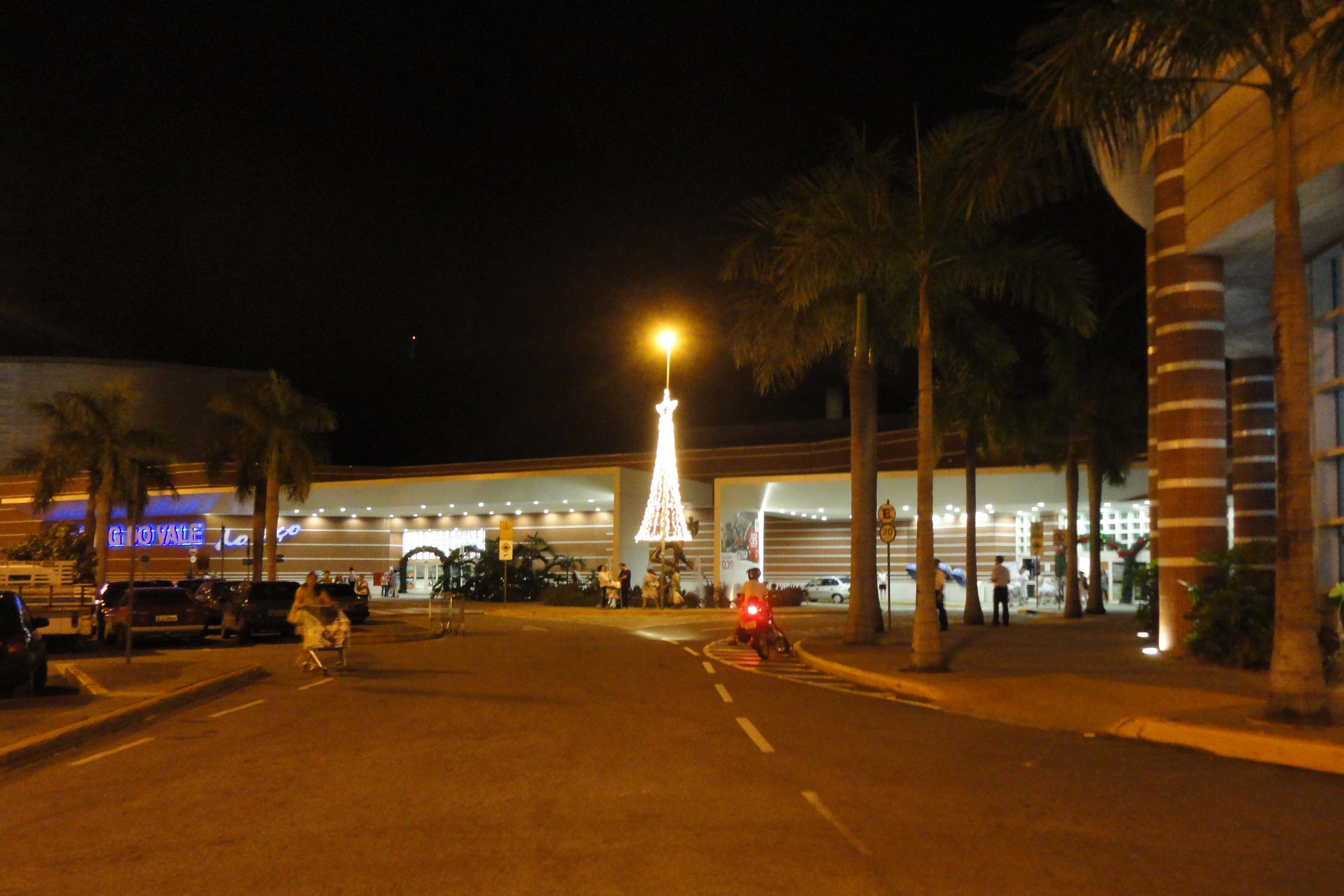
Shopping Vale do Aço Mall in 2010 Christmas

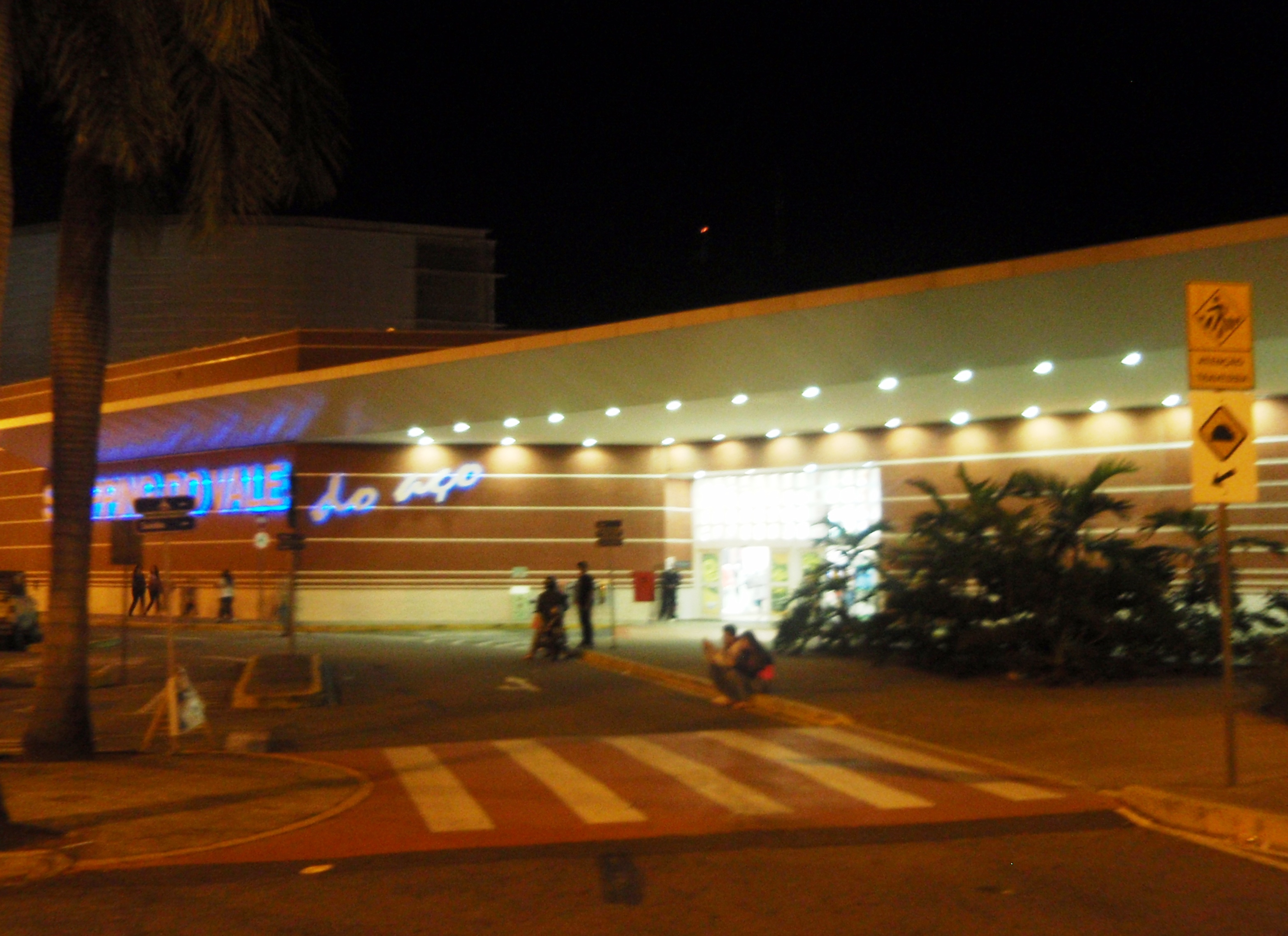
Shopping Vale do Aço in 2010

The Shopping Vale do Aço project began in 1994, through a partnership between Intermall Empreendimentos e Participações, Fundação São Francisco Xavier, and Cooperativa de Consumo dos Empregados da Usiminas (Consul). Consul's central warehouse was located there and used as a construction site, but got demolished before the mall's foundations were laid. Intermall also managed other shopping centers in Minas Gerais, such as Itaú Power Shopping in Contagem and Shopping Cidade in Belo Horizonte, but sold a large part of its representation to a Canadian firm, subsequently restricting its activities only to the Ipatinga mall.

The creation of the mall followed a process of decentralization of commercial activity in Ipatinga, which had registered a considerable rise in the city center between the 1980s and 1990s. Its construction began in 1997 and lasted around 11 months, being executed almost exclusively with the fitting of steel structures. The steel structure employed was supplied by Usiminas Mecânica, a subsidiary of Usiminas. The inauguration took place on September 24, 1998, and it was one of the first developments of its kind in a region whose predominant source of income is from the industrial sector. Initially, the construction covered an area of 269 thousand ft^{2} (25.0 thousand m^{2}), with a total of 77 stores, a food court, a Consul hypermarket, and the first stage of construction of the Usiminas Cultural Center, which initially consisted of the Hideo Kobayashi Art Gallery. On October 31, 2002, the cultural center's theater was opened, with a capacity of 724 seats, regarded as one of the most modern in Brazil.

The initial project planned for both vertical and horizontal expansions. Since its inception, the mall has received three expansions, completed on March 23, 2006, June 12, 2007, and September 24, 2015. By 2013, the mall had one floor and a floor area of 32,291 square feet (2,999.9 square metres) that encompassed 112 stores. The latest expansion, which began on July 8, 2013 and opened two years later in honor of its 17th anniversary, resulted in a covered parking lot with seven floors and a second rentable floor, increasing the number of stores by more than double. In the course of construction work on the latest expansion, two deaths were reported: a run-over by a third-party company's truck and another from electrocution.

In December 2020, it was announced that Consul would end its activities in the mall's hypermarket and that this area would be taken over by the Coelho Diniz supermarket chain the following year. The process is due to an agreement between Consul and Usiminas.

== Construction systems ==
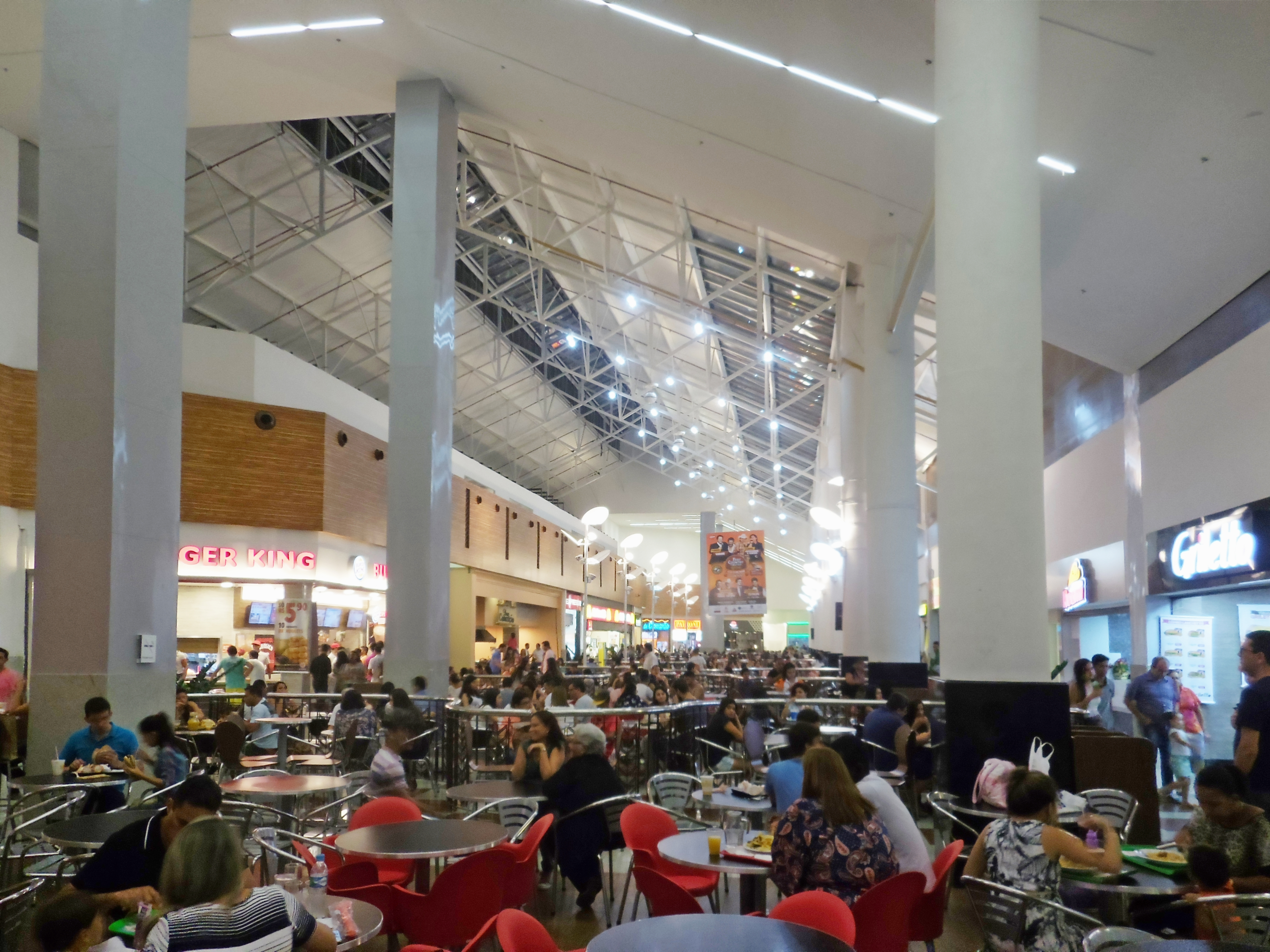
Vale do Aço Shopping Mall Food Court

The flat terrain, easy access, proximity to the supplier of the steel structures, and the precast materials were factors that favored the fast execution of the project. The mall was originally built by joining steel structures, most of them made of "SAC-41" steel. In the circulation areas, the trussed beams that support the roof are visible. The use of precast systems was intended to favor later expansions, with elements adaptable to other types of structures. Unlike the original construction, in which steel was used exclusively, mixed steel and concrete systems were used in the later expansions.

The cladding was made of precast concrete and ceramic block masonry, with openings made of metal frames and tempered glass. The exterior facades were finished with standard beaver and white ceramics. Although there is an anti-vibration channel, the structure still suffers the effects of the vibrations produced by the highway BR-381 and the Vitória-Minas Railway (EFVM), which run parallel to the mall. This combined with occasional hydraulic leaks or even the action of time generates the need for occasional repairs and re-dimensions in the structure or coating. Corrosion of metallic components due to moisture also entails anti-corrosion treatment.

Other characteristics are the metal roof, solid concrete slabs, and caulking of structural joints, in addition to vertical and horizontal cladding, providing air conditioning and acoustic insulation. Certain sectors inside the building, including the food court, received overhead lighting. In the area originally occupied by the Consul hypermarket, the lattice beams span 78 feet (24 meters). The roof is composed of galvanized trapezoidal tiles, with thermal and acoustic insulation. The slag masonry (produced with steel mill waste) used in the hypermarket was produced by Usimix.

== Infrastructure ==
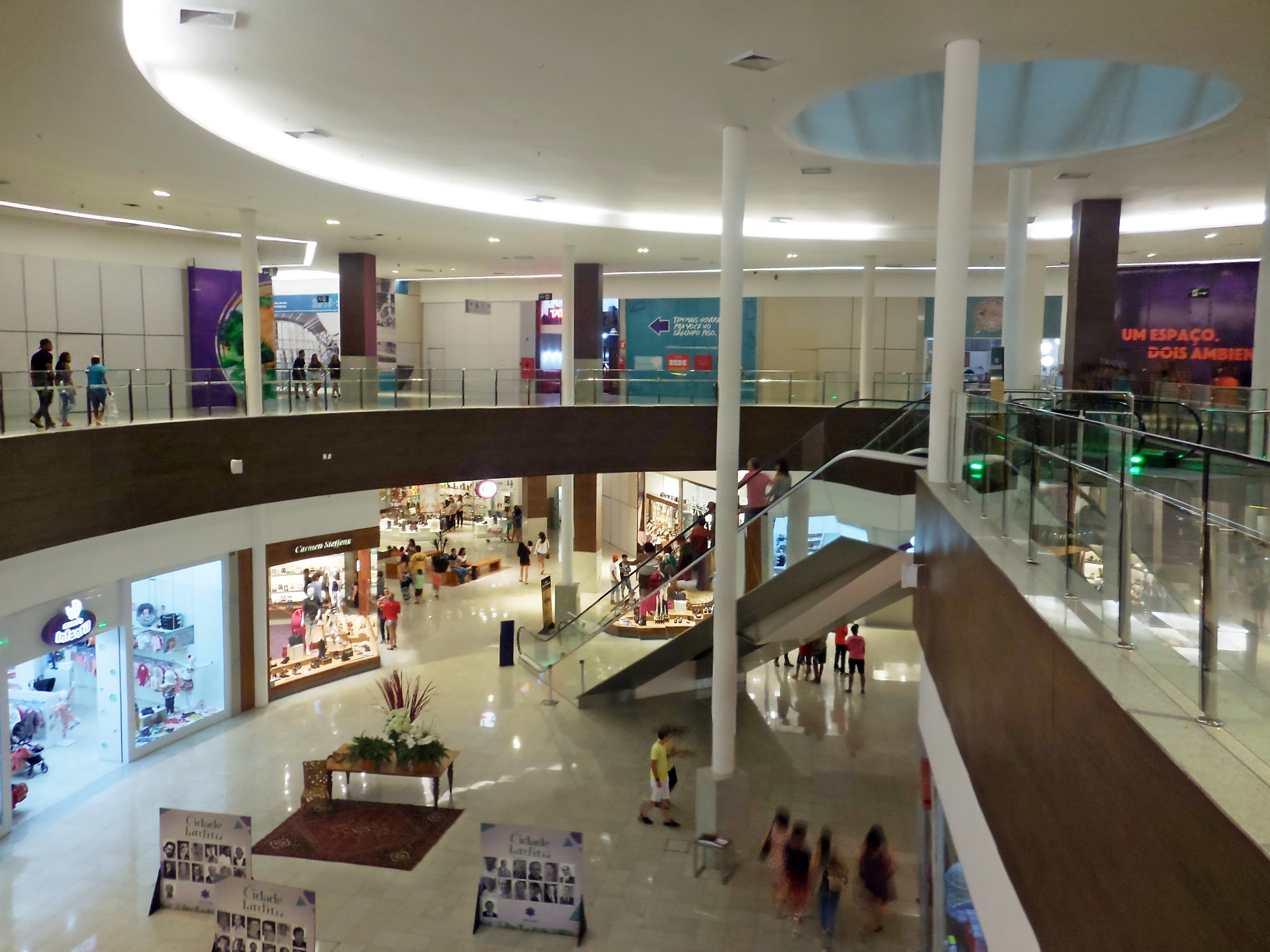
Interior of the Vale do Aço shopping center.

At the end of the 2015 expansion, the number of stores was increased to over 300, with nine main stores, spread over two floors. According to 2020 data, the Shopping Vale do Aço complex covers 86,112 square feet (8,000.1 square metres), with a gross leasable area of 32,291 square feet (2,999.9 square metres). Located in the middle of the lanes of Avenida Pedro Linhares Gomes (an urban stretch of BR-381), the mall's area also includes the seven-story covered parking lot, in addition to the open parking lot and the Usiminas Cultural Center. The covered and open parking lots total 1,800 spots, according to 2020 data, and there has been charging for its use since January 2016.

The shopping, leisure, and service center, directly and indirectly, employs approximately 3 thousand people and received an average monthly flow of 60 thousand people and 18 thousand vehicles according to data from 2016. Among the customers, about 37% belong to the upper class and 42% to the middle class. Four movie theaters, managed by Moviecom, were inaugurated on the second floor in December 2014 to replace the two old ones and have 146, 212, 212, and 163 seats. In 2019, the construction of a new theater, with a capacity for 110 people, was announced. According to 2020 data, one of the theaters is equipped with 3D technology. In addition, they are the main movie theaters in the Vale do Aço in activity.

In 2016, a nightclub with a capacity for 800 people was opened on the upper floor of the development. Already in November 2018 an ecumenical chapel, created in partnership with the Sacred Heart of Jesus Parish (Paróquia Sagrado Coração de Jesus), went into operation. In addition to the Usiminas Cultural Center, Usiminas was responsible for 18,298 square feet (1,699.9 square metres), area that was given by the mall in a loan for the installation of the Consul hypermarket (Usiminas Employees' Consumption Cooperative). However, this area was sold to the Coelho Diniz supermarket in 2020.

== Culture ==
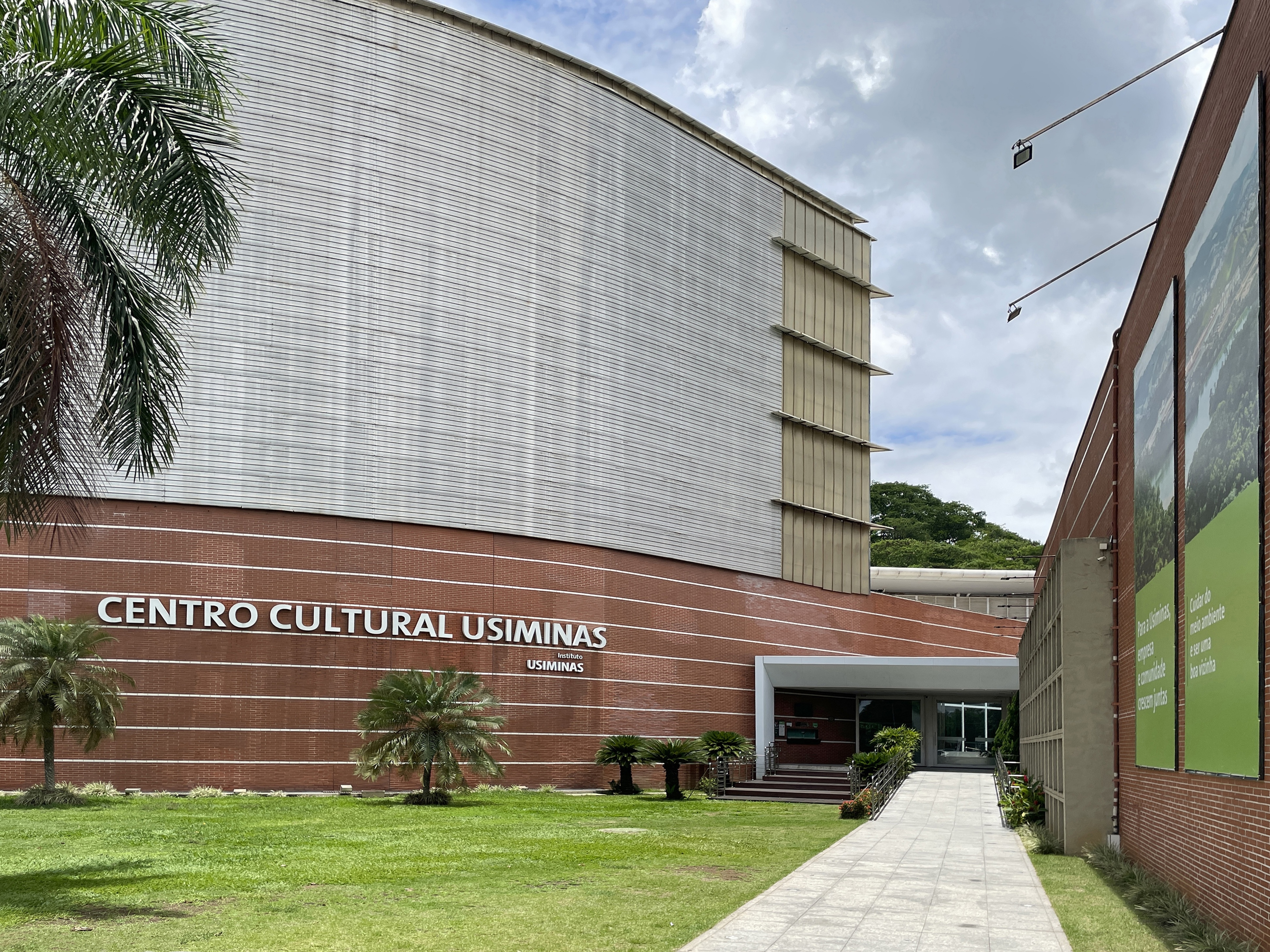
Entrance to the Usiminas Cultural Center

Occasionally, the Vale do Aço mall hosts regional and national artistic performances. The Usiminas Cultural Center offers workshops, theater, and music performances. Its theater is considered one of the most modern in the country, hosting recurrent attractions such as the Campanha de Popularização do Teatro e da Dança and Ipatinga Live Jazz. The mall's food court also hosts performances of different musical styles and genres, especially regional artists. During the Christmas period, promotions and raffles are held among the stores and the shopping center receives special decorations with garlands, toys, a cascade of lights, and a Christmas tree. In addition to the Christmas decoration, there is a "miniature train" and a Santa Claus attraction for children to take pictures. Other occasions that also usually feature thematic decorations and promotions are Easter, Mother's Day, Valentine's Day, and Festa Junina.

The shopping center is considered the main leisure and entertainment facility of the Vale do Aço Metropolitan Area. According to a survey released by the Serviço Brasileiro de Apoio às Micro e Pequenas Empresas (SEBRAE), in 2012, 98% of professionals who receive business tourists in the region stated knowing the mall (the same percentage as Ipanema Park), as well as 98% of hotel, restaurant and tour operator managers (followed by Ipanema Park, with 95%), thus being the most well-known attraction among other places in the Vale do Aço that were cited in a questionnaire. Among the first group cited, 79% would recommend the shopping center to a traveler on some occasion, ranking second on this list, behind local bars and restaurants (98%). According to the same survey, the mall is mentioned by some business owners as the only attraction adequately publicized in the region.

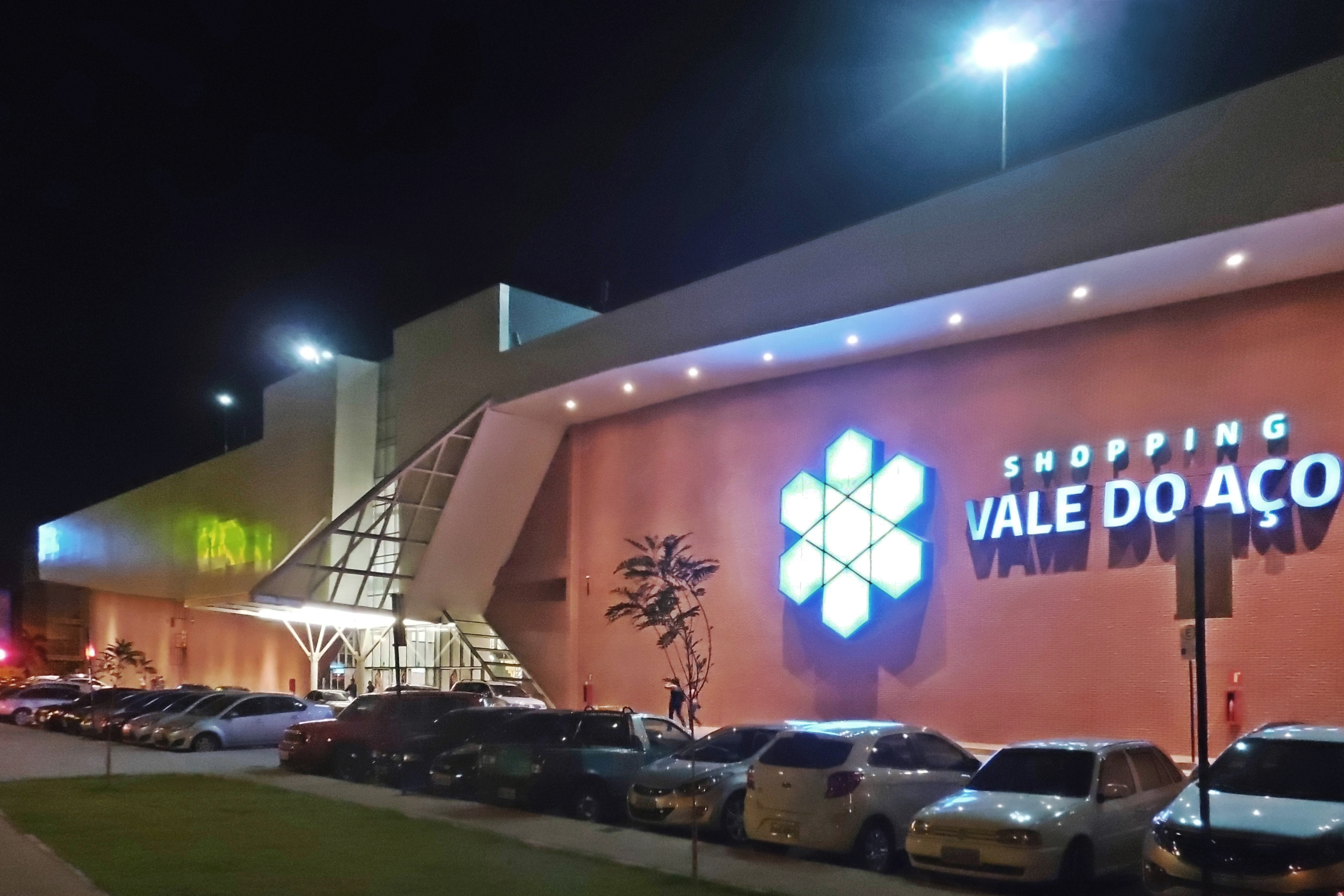
Nocturn view

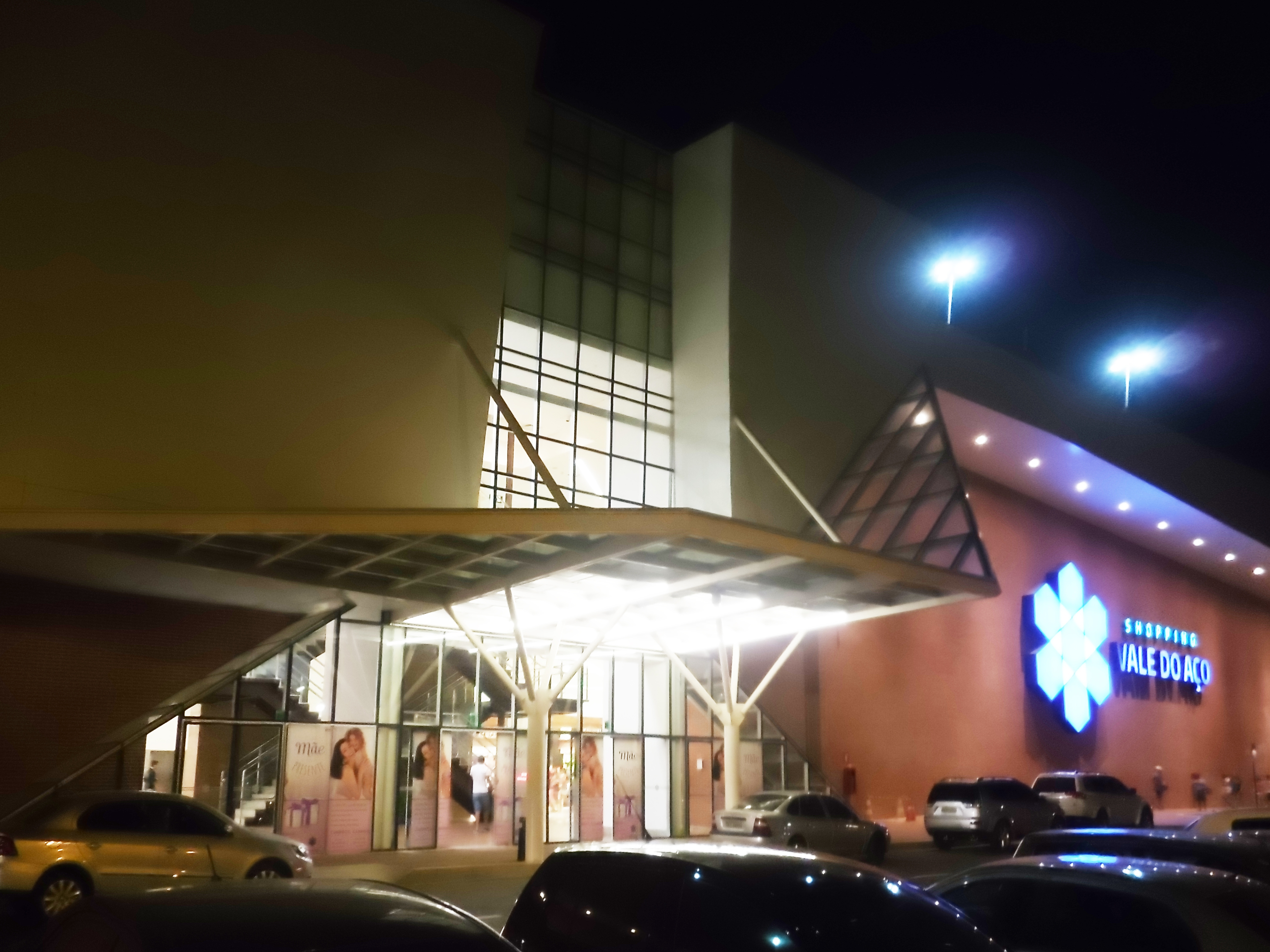
One of the main entrances to Shopping Vale do Aço

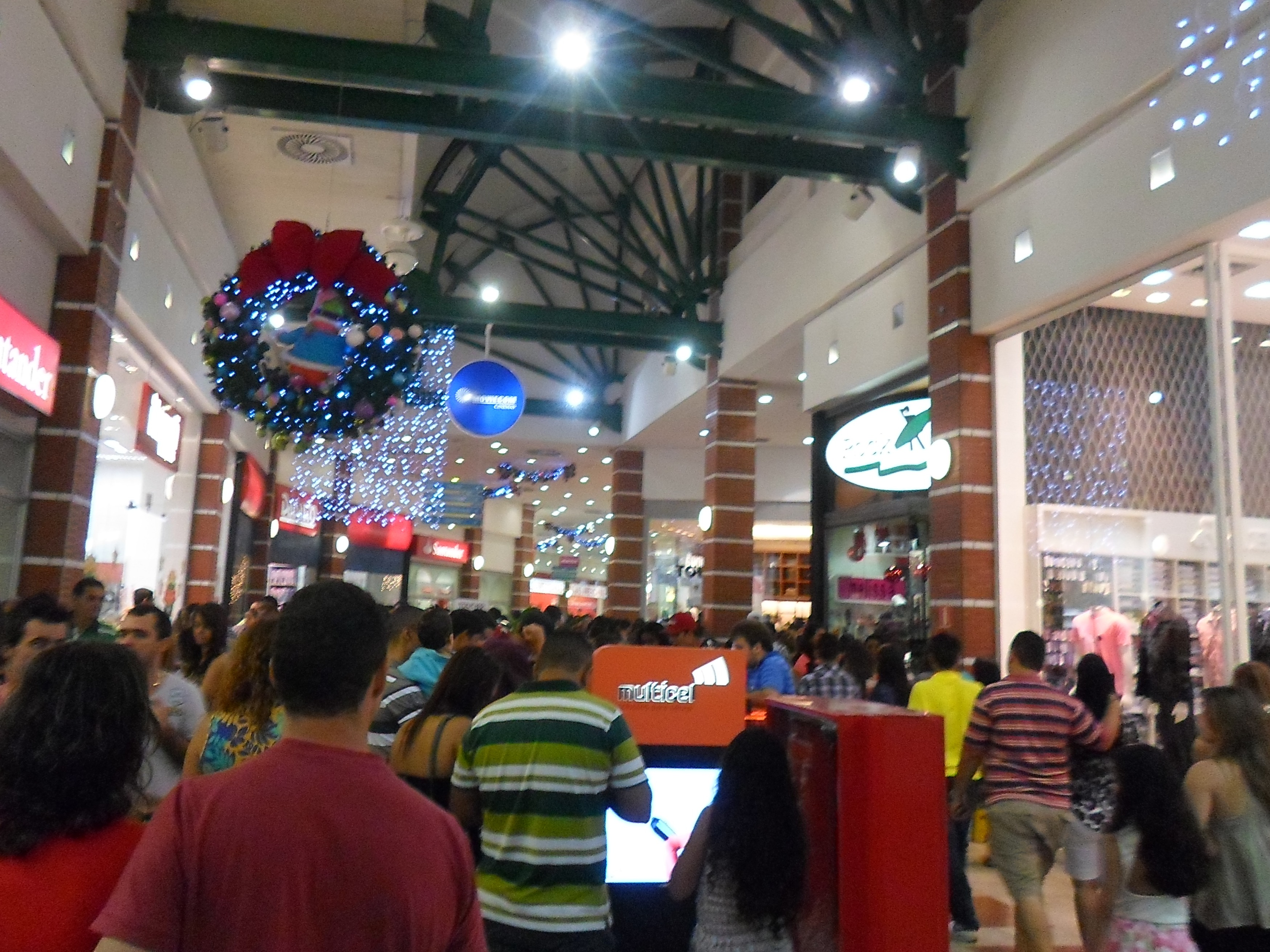
Consumers at the mall during the Christmas period

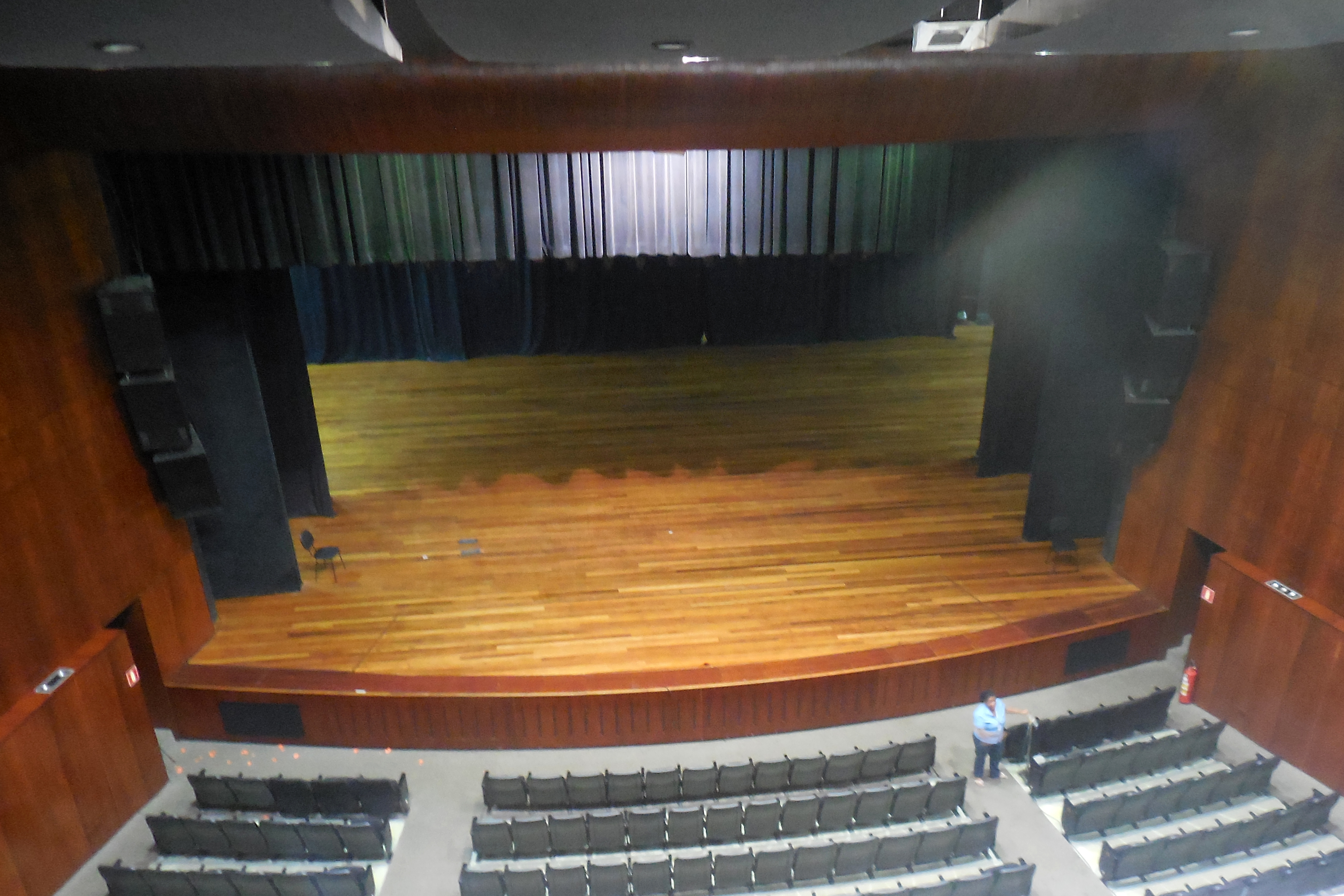
Usiminas Cultural Center stage view

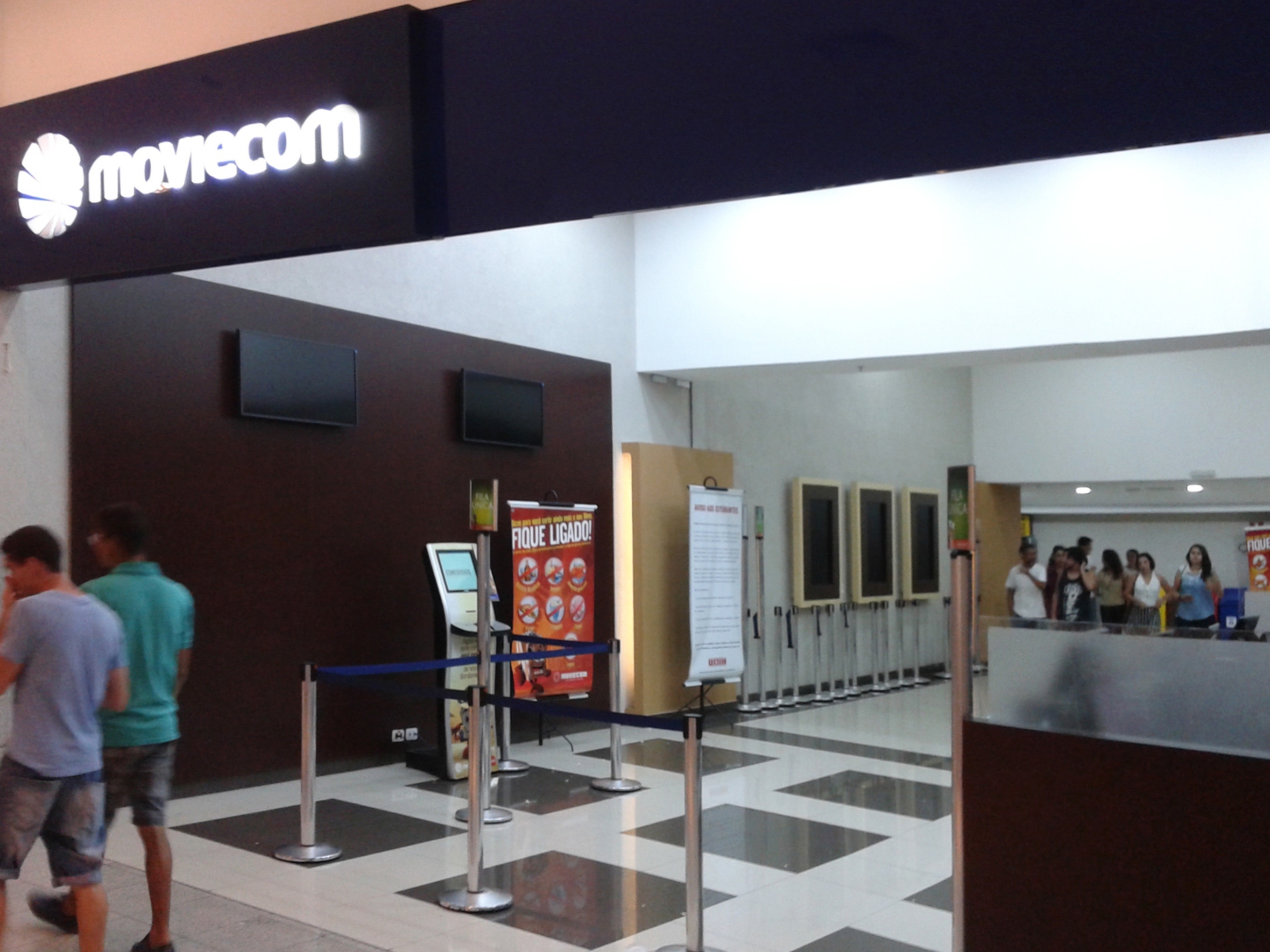
Entrance to Moviecom movie theaters

== Bibliography ==
- Alves, Carlos Eduardo Azeredo (March 2011). "Construção em aço no Vale do Aço do estado de Minas Gerais: cronologia, características e patologias" (PDF). Departamento de Engenharia Civil da Universidade Federal de Ouro Preto. Archived from the original (PDF) on 29 August 2017.
- Almeida, Danilo de Carvalho Botelho (April 2004). "Princípios bioclimáticos para desenho urbano: estudo de caso no Centro de Ipatinga/MG". Instituto de Educação Continuada da Pontifícia Universidade Católica de Minas Gerais.
- Plano Diretor de Desenvolvimento Integrado (August 2014). "Região Metropolitana do Vale do Aço - diagnóstico final" (PDF). Centro Universitário Católica do Leste de Minas Gerais (Unileste). 3 (495–825). Archived from the original (PDF) on 2 February 2016.
- Ramos, Bruno Augusto Falci (December 2012). "Perspectivas do turismo para o Vale do Aço" (PDF). Serviço Brasileiro de Apoio às Micro e Pequenas Empresas (SEBRAE). 1. Archived from the original (PDF) on 8 August 2016.
