= ParkShopping Brasília =

Coordinates: 15°49′59″S 47°57′19″W

Park Shopping Brasília
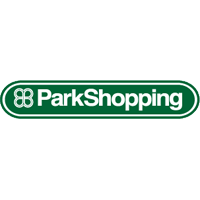
- Park Shopping Brasília Logo
- Location: SAISO 6580 - Zona Industrial, Guará, DF, Brazil 71219-900
- Opened: 8 November 1983
- Owner: Mutiplan Empreendimentos Imobiliários S.A.
- Num. of stores: 348
- Num. of anchor tenants: 9
- Floor area: 127,592m2
- Floors: 3
- Parking: 4,005
- Website: www.parkshopping.com.br

Park Shopping Brasília is a shopping center located in the Sector of Southwest Isolated Areas (SAISO), in the administrative region of Guará, in the Federal District, Brazil. It was inaugurated on November 8, 1983, being the 2nd shopping center to be inaugurated in the Federal District after Conjunto Nacional, and located on the road between Guará and Brasília, near the Interstate Bus Station of Brasília.

It has 242 stores, including nine anchors (C & A, Fnac, Lojas Americanas, Riachuelo, Renner, Zara, Hot Zone, complex bowling Park Bowling and cinema complex ParkPlex group Severiano Ribeiro group and Paris Filmes), and five mega-stores (Ponto Frio, Livraria Siciliano, Centaur, Outback and Siberian). It has 264 shops, 03 floors, 12 escalators, 03 elevators, 2761 parking spaces and 11 cinemas. The consumer traffic is 13.9 million people a year. The mall is set to have a R$221 million expansion to be concluded by 2026.

== Expansions ==
- October/2008 - Fashion area with 22 stores
- November/2008 - New food court with 8 new restaurants
- June/2009 - 82 stores of various segments
- October/2009 - New parking lot

== Transit ==
ParkShopping is served by the Federal District Metro's Shopping Station, which gives direct access to the mall via a suspended walkway as well as the Interstate Bus Station.
