= Brigadeiro Faria Lima Avenue =

Important avenue in the city of São Paulo, Brazil

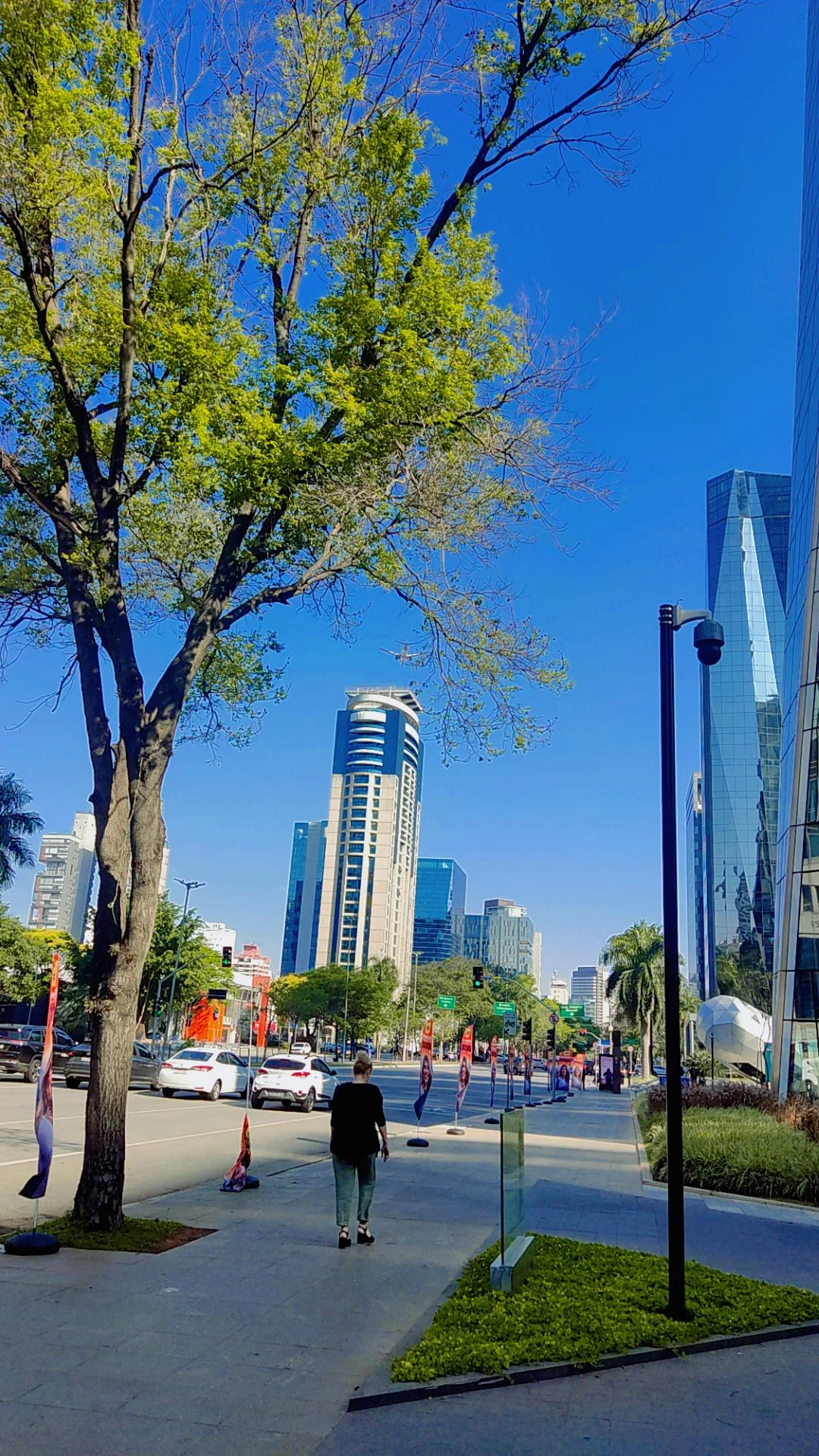
- View of the Avenue
- Interactive map of Brigadeiro Faria Lima Avenue
- Native name: Avenida Brigadeiro Faria Lima (Portuguese)
- Former name: Rua Iguatemi (Iguatemi Street)
- Length: 4.6 km (2.9 mi)
- Location: São Paulo, Brazil
- North end: Avenida Pedroso de Morais
- Major junctions: Rua Cardeal Arcoverde; Rua Teodoro Sampaio; Avenida Eusébio Matoso; Avenida Rebouças; Avenida Cidade Jardim; Avenida Juscelino Kubitschek
- South end: Avenida Hélio Pellegrino

Construction
- Inauguration: 1970

Avenida Brigadeiro Faria Lima (in English: Brigadeiro Faria Lima Avenue), most commonly known as just Faria Lima, is an important avenue in the city of São Paulo, Brazil. It spans the upscale Pinheiros, Jardim Paulistano, Itaim Bibi and Vila Olímpia neighborhoods. It is the main financial center in Brazil, being also an important commercial center that rivals the Downtown and Paulista Avenue areas.

From the 2010s onward, the avenue emerged as one of Brazil's principal financial centers, attracting numerous financial institutions to the avenue and its surrounding streets. As a result, "Faria Lima" became a metonym for the country's financial sector and sometimes compared to the Wall Street. Examples of financial institutions include BTG Pactual, Itaú BBA, Bradesco BBI (three of Brazilian biggest investment banks), Goldman Sachs, Credit Suisse, Morgan Stanley, Bank of America Merrill Lynch, JPMorgan Chase, UBS and many others. Brazil's largest stock exchange, B3, which is headquartered in the Historic Center of São Paulo, holds an office on the avenue.

== History ==
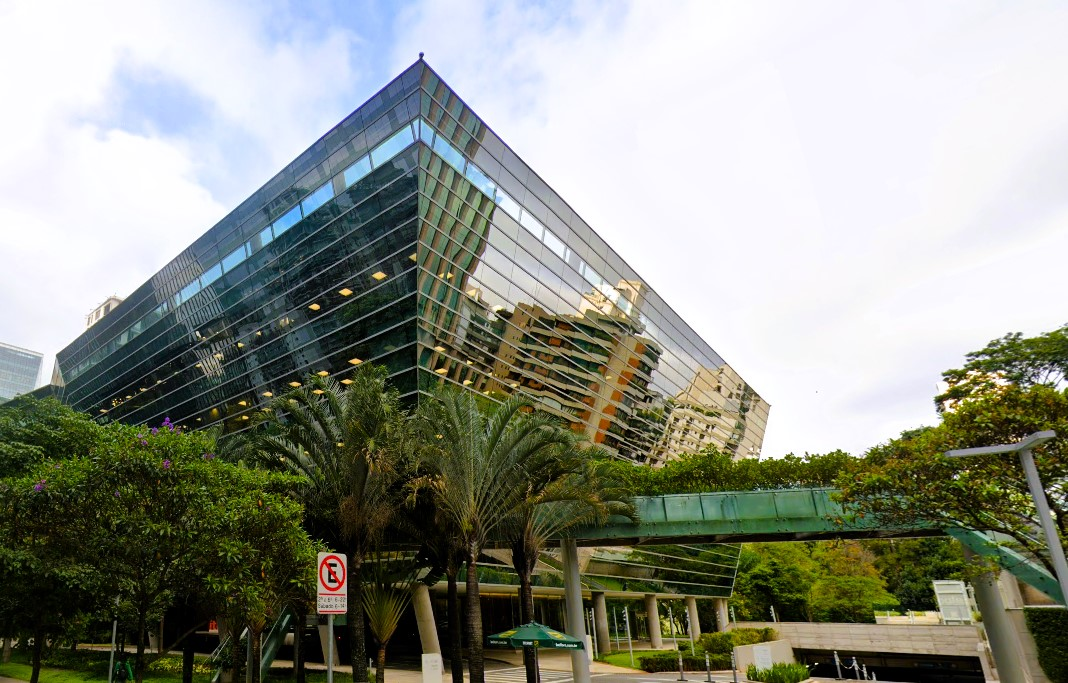
Faria Lima 3500, the most expensive building ever purchased in the country, worth more than 1 billion reais

Avenida Faria Lima was built in the late 1960s, with an initial stretch lying between Rua Iguatemi ("Iguatemi Street"), in the Itaim Bibi district, and Largo da Batata ("Potato Square"), in the neighborhood of Pinheiros, crossing the Jardins region of the city. Initiated in 1967 by São Paulo's then mayor, Brevet Brigadier José Vicente Faria Lima, it would receive his name two years later, after his death.

By 1970, the construction of several high-rise commercial buildings was started, tearing through the middle of the large residential area that had been there before. The large skyscrapers that started to rise above the Jardins prompted it to be called the "Second Paulista."

In the 1990s, then mayor Paulo Maluf devised a plan to extend the avenue in both directions, to the north between Largo da Batata and Pedroso de Moraes Avenue in Pinheiros, and to the south between Cidade Jardim Avenue in Jardim Paulistano and Hélio Pellegrino Avenue in Vila Olímpia. This was done by widening a small residential road in Itaim Bibi. The project was controversial because it would displace many citizens, and it was argued that the rapid expansion of the city would make it only a temporary solution to the growing traffic problems, but it was carried out and opened in the late 1990s.

== Landmarks ==
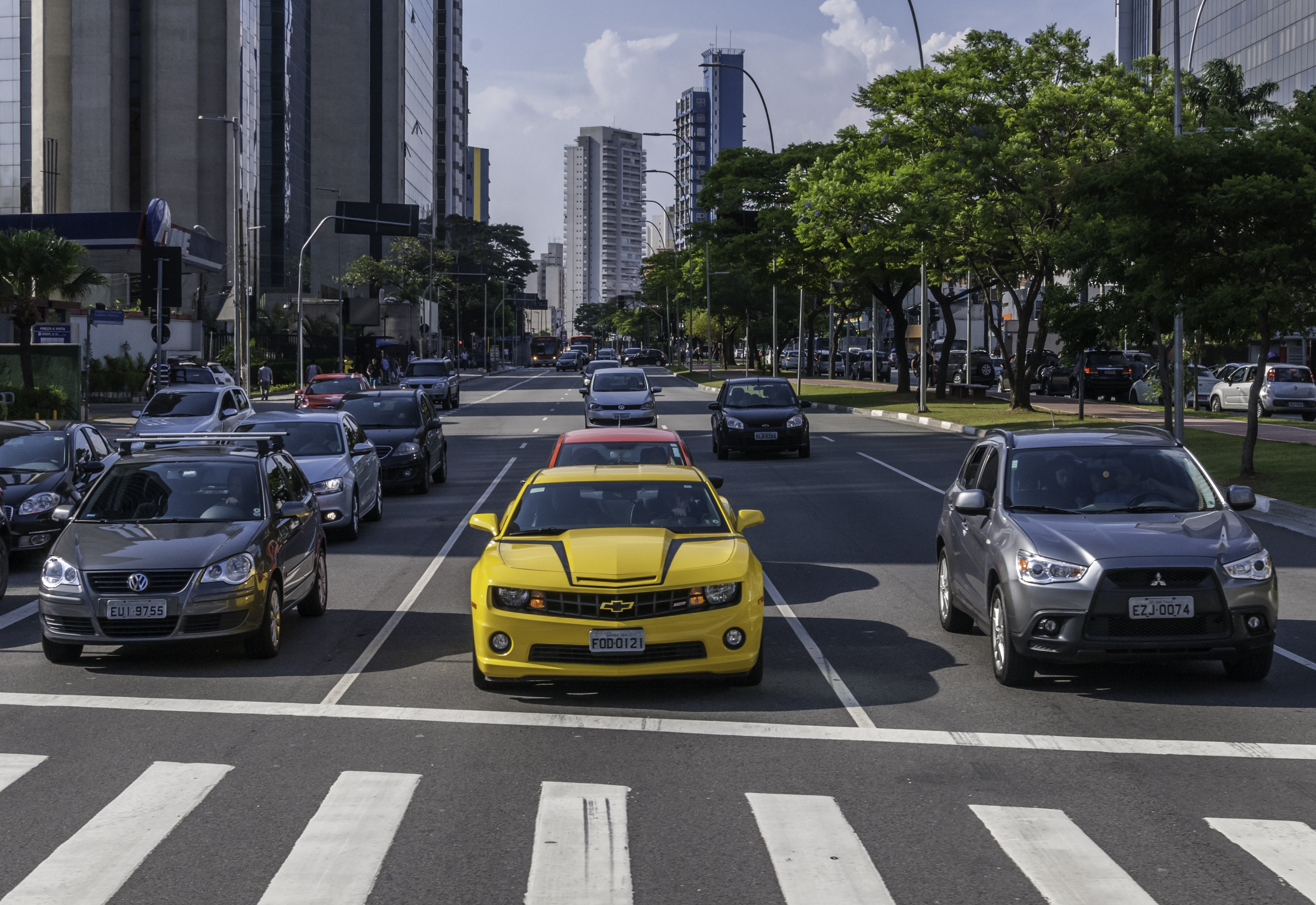
Brigadeiro Faria Lima Avenue.

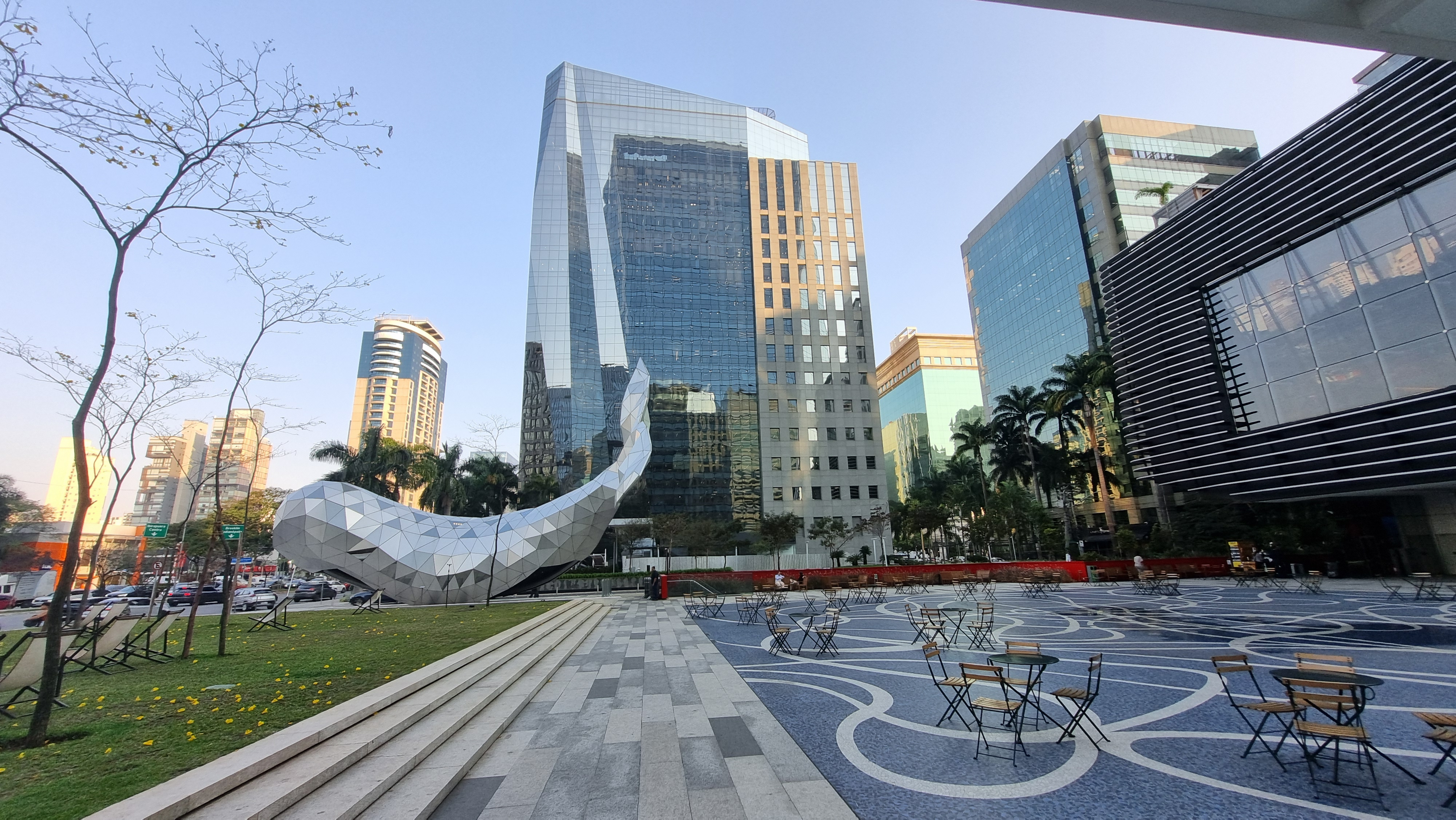
B32 building square

On Faria Lima Avenue, there are many popular and important places that attract locals (Paulistanos) and visitors alike, such as:

- Iguatemi São Paulo Shopping Center - the first shopping mall built in the city and in Brazil, opened in 1966. It is among the most luxurious in the country.
- Museum of the Brazilian Home (Portuguese: Museu da Casa Brasileira) - a museum for Brazilian and international architecture and interior design.
- Pinheiros Sport Club - one of the oldest sport clubs in the city, it contains large open fields and many recreational facilities in the heart of the city.
- Wall Street English - one of the most modern units of the international English School.

The area is also known for its newly built and futuristic skyscrapers, such as:

- Dacon Building - with its cylindrical design, it is one of the most iconic skyscrapers in São Paulo.
- Infinity Tower - location of Credit Suisse, Goldman Sachs, Louis Vuitton, Apple, Facebook (top floor), and others.
- Pátio Victor Malzoni - location of BTG Pactual, Google (top floor), Grupo Cimed recently moved to the third floor of the property.

The avenue itself and its surroundings have a prominent nightlife, with numerous bars and night clubs. The area also has other important city landmarks, such as Eldorado Shopping Center, and many elegant restaurants and hotels.
