= Midway Mall (Brazil) =

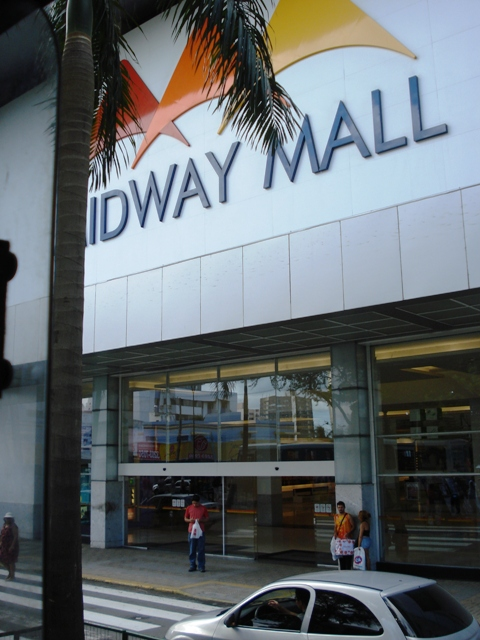
- Midway Mall in Natal, Brazil
- Location: Natal, Rio Grande do Norte, Brazil
- Coordinates: 5.81116°S 35.2063°W
- Opened: 2005
- Manager: Grupo Guararapes (Guararapes Group)
- Owner: Grupo Guararapes
- Num. of stores: 300
- Num. of anchor tenants: 10
- Floors: 3
- Website: www.midwaymall.com.br

The Midway Mall, located in the city of Natal, is the largest shopping center in the state of Rio Grande do Norte and one of the largest in the Northeast Region of Brazil. It has a floor space of 231 acres (930,000 m^{2}) distributed over three levels. The mall offers 300 shops, among them 13 anchor stores and seven satellite cinema multiplex network Cinemark stadiums with a capacity of 2,140 seats. The six-level parking garage accommodates 3,500 vehicles. The property belongs to the Guararapes Group, which also owns the network of department stores Riachuelo.
