= Morumbi Shopping =

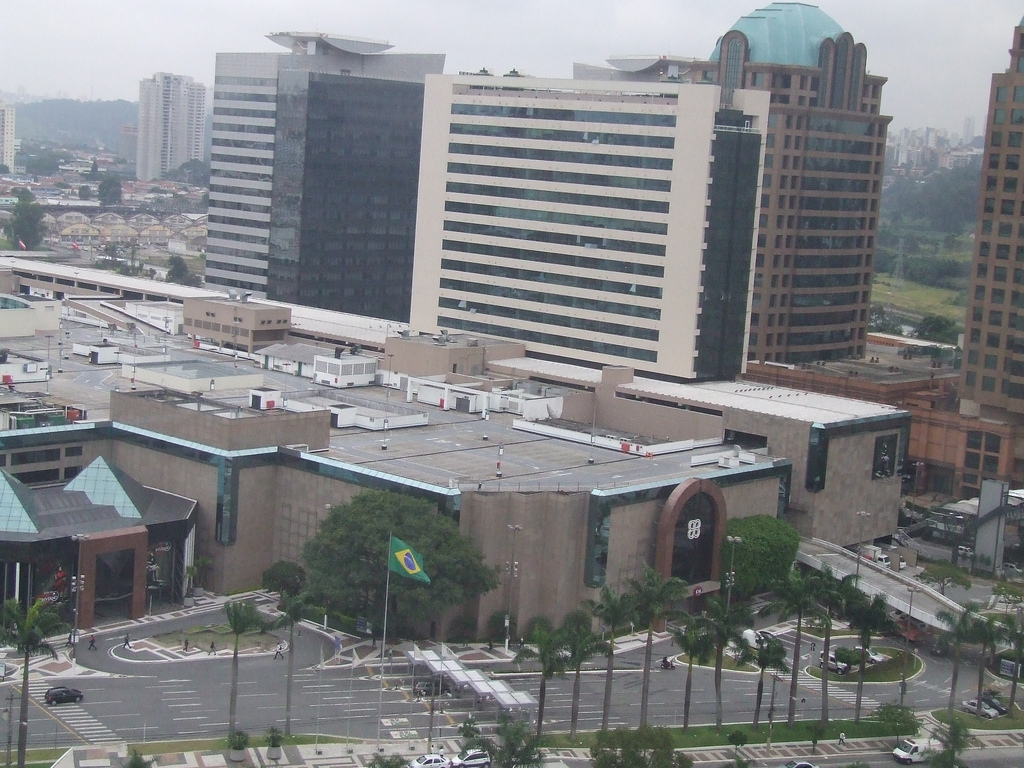
- Location: São Paulo, Brazil
- Address: Avenida Roque Petroni Júnior, 1089, Itaim Bibi
- Opened: 3 May 1982
- Owner: Multiplan
- Num. of stores: 483
- Parking: 3,300 spaces
- Website: http://www.morumbishopping.com.br/

Shopping Morumbi, or Morumbi Shopping, is a shopping centre located in the Campo Belo district of São Paulo, Brazil. Located near Morumbi Station in an area with a high concentration of businesses and hotels, the shopping centre is considered to be one of the most popular in the country by magazine Exame.

Opened on 3 May 1982, it currently houses more than 480 stores, including the anchor stores C&A, Renner and Zara, as well as the only Apple Store in São Paulo. It contains a food hall and two recreational areas: Hotzone, a games arcade, and Play Space, a play area aimed at young children.

== Cinema shooting ==
On 3 November 1999, a student of medicine, Mateus da Costa Meira, opened fire with a 9mm submachine gun in an evening screening of Fight Club at the cinema located in the shopping centre. Three people were killed and a further four were wounded. Mateus da Costa Meira was later sentenced to 120 years in prison.

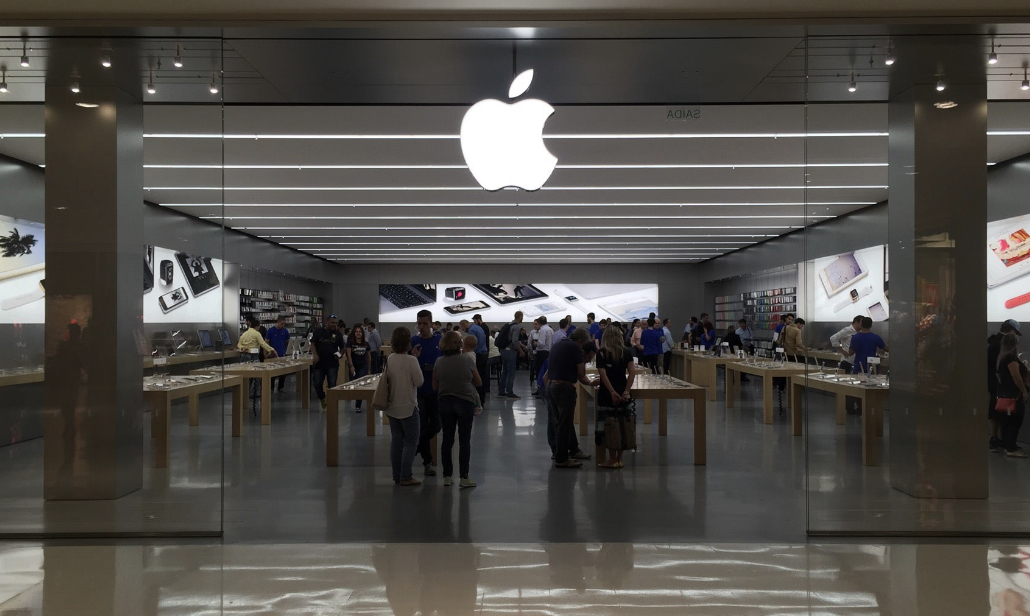
Apple Store in Morumbi Shopping

The screen in which the shooting occurred was permanently closed. The cinema closed its three remaining screens in 2012, freeing up space for new stores.

== Access ==
Morumbi Shopping can be accessed via Morumbi CPTM station of CPTM Line 9 via an overhead bridge from the neighbouring Shopping Market Place.
