= Conjunto Nacional (Brasília) =

Shopping Conjunto Nacional
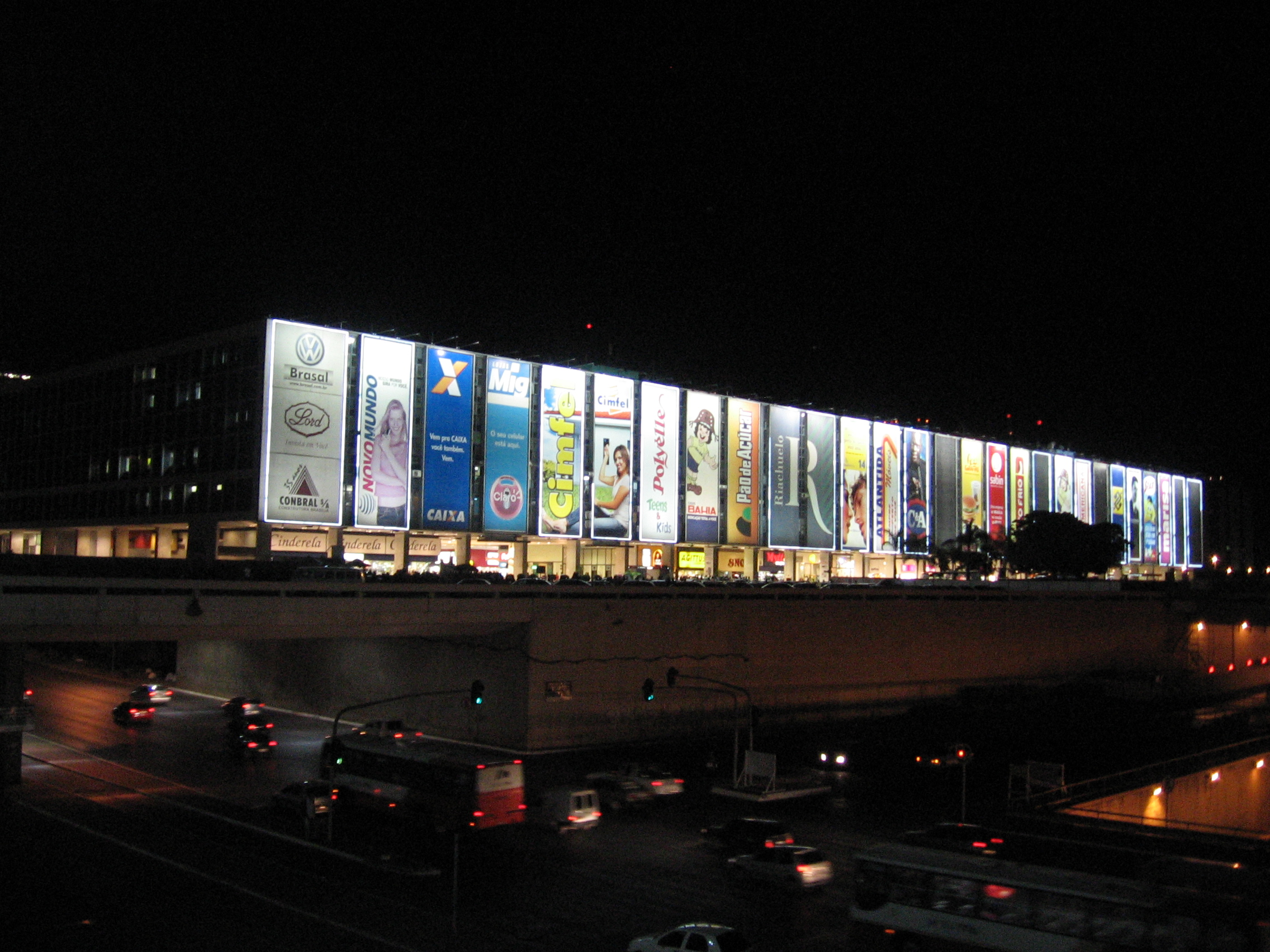
- Shopping Conjunto Nacional
- Location: Brasília, DF, Brazil
- Coordinates: 15.7913°S 47.8832°W
- Opened: 21 November 1971
- Manager: Ancar Ivanhoe
- Num. of stores: 320
- Num. of anchor tenants: 6
- Parking: 494
- Website: www.conjuntonacional.com.br

Shopping Conjunto Nacional (Joint National Mall) is the first shopping center in Brasília, and the second mall to be built in Brazil. It was opened in 1971 and is located near the bus station in the Central Zone of Brasília. It is the largest mall in the Federal District and is among the top 30 of Brazil, with 320 stores and 118,100 square meters built.
