= Seven (Brazilian TV channel) =

Brazilian television network

- Type: Cable channel
- Country: Brazil
- Availability: Nationwide
- Founded: 1 March 2021 by J. V. Nunes Souza
- Headquarters: Ipatinga, Minas Gerais
- Parent: Grupo Seven
- Digital channel(s): CDN TV 169
- Picture format: 480i (SDTV); 1080i (HDTV)
- Official website: www.tvcaravelas.com.br/home
- Language: Portuguese

Channel Seven, or simply 'Seven' , is a signature and virtual channel of the Seven Group belonging to the conglomerate of the Amigos do Vale do Aço de Ipatinga Foundation. It is directed exclusively for dubbed films, series, variety cultural programs, films and series that have generally been released on exclusive cable television channels, which are later released on Channel Seven, the channel uses the default language português. The target audience of the channel in the country are classes C, D and E that, according to the company, they demand content, but do not have the conditions to hire high-quality plans, they present their programming for free on the Internet at alternate times. In the future, there will be a video programming system on demand of the station's own initiative. The initial proposal of the channel was to contain programming without commercial bottom, some regional programs produced in the city of Ipatinga are transmitted in the channel.

== Programming ==
The lineup includes original series, predominantly of the crime and action genre, theatrical programs, classic and current films, musicals and documentaries, performing arts and special events, and shows by internationally renowned singers.

== Programs ==
Most of the TV programs Caravelas are shown, as well as their own programs that are set up as television cinemas:

- Cine Sucessos
- Cine Ação
- Cine Comédia
- Cine Drama
- Cine Terror
- Tempo de Séries
- Cine Retrô
- Investigação
- TV Natureza
- TV Junior
- TV Kids
- Cine Família
