= Peter Gow =

Peter Gow may refer to:

- Peter Gow (politician) (1818–1886), Ontario businessman and political figure
- Peter Gow Cameron, Ontario politician
- Peter Gow (anthropologist) (1958–2021), social anthropologist
