= Carlos Fitzcarrald =

Peruvian rubber baron (1862–1897)

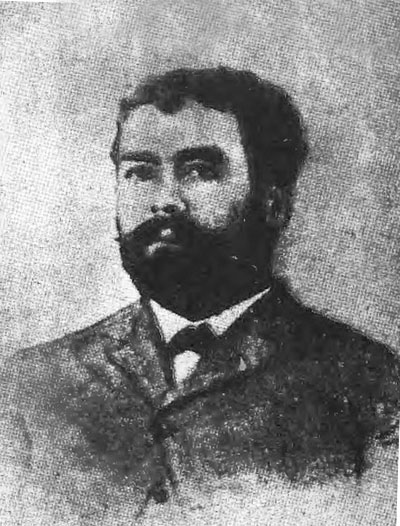
- Fitzcarrald at age 30.
- Born: Isaías Fermín Fitzgerald; 6 July 1862; San Luis, Peru
- Died: 9 July 1897 (aged 35); Urubamba, Peru
- Occupation: Rubber baron
- Spouse: Aurora Velazco (m. 1888)

Carlos Fermín Fitzcarrald López (6 July 1862 – 9 July 1897) (Note: In Spanish documents, the name Fitzcarrald is also spelled "Fiscarral" or "Fiscarrald".) was a Peruvian rubber baron. He was born in San Luis, Ancash, in a province that was later named after him. In the early 1890s, Fitzcarrald discovered the Isthmus of Fitzcarrald, which was a portage route from the Ucayali River into the Madre de Dios River basin. Fitzcarrald became known as the "King of Caucho" (natural rubber) due to his success during the rubber boom. (Note: This title is attributed to Fitzcarrald by his biographer, Ernesto Reyna.) His enterprise exploited and enslaved Asháninka, Mashco-Piro, Harákmbut, Shipibo-Conibo and other native groups, who were then dedicated to the extraction of rubber. In 1897, Fitzcarrald, along with his Bolivian business partner Antonio Vaca Díez, drowned in an accident on the Urubamba River.

== Early life ==
Carlos Fermín Fitzcarrald López was born as Isaías Fermín Fitzgerald, the eldest son of an Irish-American sailor and trader who married a Peruvian woman. (Note: Gabriel Sala corroborates that Fitzcarrald's father was American and his mother was Peruvian.) Isaías's father and grandfather were American sailors. Isaías's grandfather, Williams Fitzgerald, was the captain of a sail boat and he drowned in a shipwreck. His son Williams Fitzgerald Jr. migrated to Peru and settled in San Luis de Huari. There he met Fermín Lopez, as well as his daughter, with whom Fitzgerald fell in love and married. The marriage resulted in seven children, whose names were: Isaías Fermín, Rosalía, Lorenzo, Grimalda, Delfín, Fernando, and Edelmira.

Williams Jr. prioritized the education of his firstborn, Isaías, ensuring that his son went to well-known schools in Peru, such as Colegio La Libertad de Huaraz and later in Lima at Liceo Peruano de Lima. Isaías was a distinguished student and his father encouraged Isaías to pursue a career as a sailor specializing in naval engineering. Williams planned to send Isaías to a nautical school in the United States around 1878. Before this, Williams encouraged Isaías to travel along the Marañón River to sell merchandise. The trip allowed Isaías to make a large profit from the cargo and familiarize himself with this relatively unexplored region of Peru.

During the business venture, in 1878, Isaías was severely wounded. (Note: Isaías's biography, Fitzcarrald, el rey del caucho claimed that he was stabbed after confronting someone he was gambling with, as Isaías believed this person was cheating by using loaded dice. This incident occurred in Llamellín, Peru.) The wound was so serious that newspapers in Huaraz and Lima reported that Isaías had perished. Isaías's father travelled to Llamellín to pay for the medical expenses and he died shortly afterwards. Isaías recovered for three months before travelling to San Luis de Huari to find better treatment and on the way back to his family, he was told that his father had died. Isaías decided to move away from his hometown and took his father's maps with him, which contained information about Amazonian regions of Peru.

Isaías went to Cerro de Pasco to join the military after finding out a war with Chile had broken out. He encountered a group of natives who had been tied up by soldiers, who were taking them to Pasco as "volunteers". Isaías protested, demanding the soldiers release the captives, who were complaining about mistreatment. The soldiers asked Isaías to produce identification; Isaías was not a citizen of Peru and had left his baptismal and school certificates at home. The soldiers found Isaías's father's maps and accusing him of being a Chilean spy. There was no proof of Isaías's identity for months until the day he was supposed to be executed. A man referred to as Fray (Friar) Carlos, who was due to administer the last rites, had met Isaías in San Luis. Fray Carlos did not recognize Isaías at first on account of sickness but recognized his story. During a confession, Fray Carlos was able to verify Isaías was the first-born son of Williams Fitzgerald Jr. Fray Carlos immediately declared under oath the prisoner indeed was Isaías Fermín and he was released. Isaías later changed his first name to Carlos because Fray Carlos had saved his life. Between 1878 and 1897, his last name was Hispanicized from Fitzgerald to Fiscarrald, which is now spelled Fitzcarrald. According to author Jean-Claude Roux, Isaías went to Loreto, in northern Peru, with the hope of making a fortune. (Note: Reyna wrote that on the advice of Fray Carlos, Isaías decided to travel to Loreto to seek "the happiness that the civilized had denied him".) Isaías disappeared from the historical record for 10 years and multiple rumors arose to explain his absence.

In 1888, Fray Carlos reported hearing of an Amachengua (reincarnation) of Inca Juan Santos Atahualpa. The white figure claimed the "Sun Father" had sent him with a message saying the tribes were to work together. The representative of the Sun to obey on Earth was said to be Carlos Fitzcarrald. Fitzcarrald threatened the natives and prophesied that the rivers would dry up and the game would be chased away if they did not listen to and obey his words. A missionary named Gabriel Sala described one method of entrapping the natives; a white figure would presented himself as the Amachengua, manipulate the natives into gathering at a specific location using threats or promises. Fitzcarrald employed around fifty men to greet natives and tell them the "Sun Father" wanted to be seen elsewhere. The natives were then coerced into canoes before travelling to the Ucayali River, then either the Iquitos or the Manu Rivers "so that they become slaves in any way, and never see their land again". (Note: On March 21, 1897, Sala wrote:"All these and a thousand other havocs are caused by the rubber business in Ucayali".) According to Sala:

Fitzgerrald intelligently exploited the belief that the Campas [Asháninka] have that one day the Son of the Sun will come down from the sky. The rubber worker, to provide himself with pawns, sent emissaries to the nomadic tribes and scattered in the immensity of the jungle, with the slogan of making it known to his ears that in a certain place the Son of the Sun had appeared ...They used a surprising cunning to convince the Indians to abandon their freedom; by means of seductive words and gifts, they reduced them and fixed their tents on the banks of the rivers, to have them more at hand as cargo ships for collecting rubber or laborers for the cultivation of the chácaras.

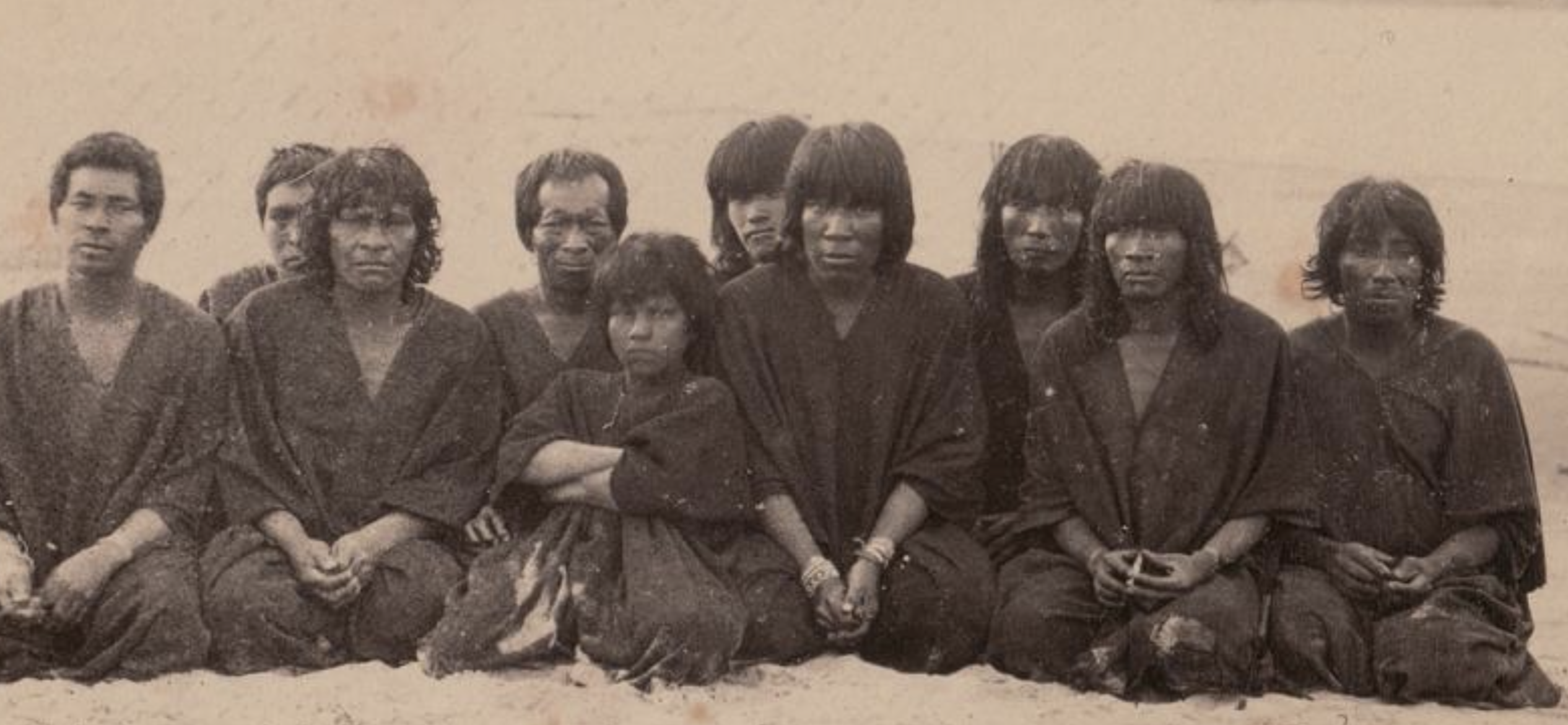
Photograph of Shipibo natives taken by Charles Kroehle in the Upper Amazon River basin, circa 1888.

== Rubber baron ==
By 1888, Fitzcarrald was already the richest rubber entrepreneur on the Ucayali River. (Note: He had previously worked along the Pachitea River as well.) In 1888, he visited Iquitos with a large quantity of rubber and many Asháninka servants. In the city, he visited Manuel Cardozo, the owner of a Brazilian rubber-exporting firm. There, he fell in love at first sight with Cardozo's stepdaughter Aurora Velazco, who was a widow. They soon married and Fitzcarrald entered a business partnership with Cardozo to extract rubber in the Ucayali. (Note: José Cardozo de Rosa and Carlos Fitzcarrald's brother, Delfín, were working together on the Urubamba River as early as 1892. At the time of Gabriel Sala's journey, Delfín and two of his cousins were staying at the port of Masisea.) Fitzcarrald already had knowledge and links with the Asháninkas, Humaguacas, Cashivos and other tribes they could exploit to tap rubber. He made fun of rumors natives of the Ucayali were savage cannibals, stating someone wise made up the tale. Fitzcarrald's new coalition dominated trade and the rubber industry in the Atalaya area, which was near the confluence of the Tambo and Urubama rivers. Fitzcarrald also owned stations and outposts on the Tambo River. Many of the independent merchants around the Tambo and Ucayali rivers eventually began working with Fitzcarrald. By 1891, most of the Piro natives on the Urubamba River were indebted to Fitzcarrald. (Note: Valdez Lozano noted that some of the Piro natives on the Tambo River were exclusively trading with Fitzcarrald, and had stopped dealing with other white merchants.)

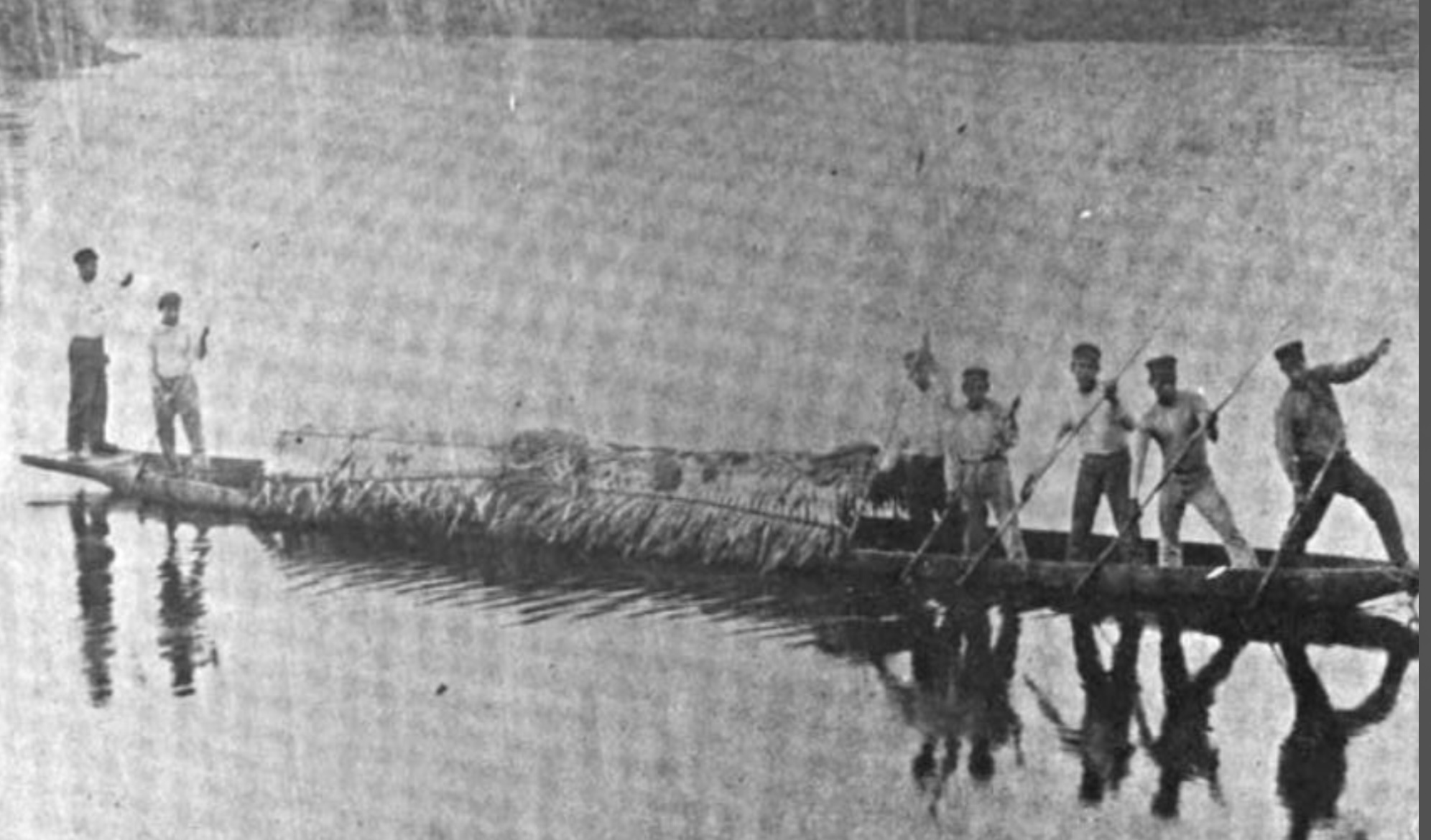
“Piros sailing the Pachitea River”

An important indigenous figure who was a part of Fitzcarrald's network was an Asháninka chief named Venancio Amaringo Campa. Amaringo began working with Fitzcarrald as early as 1893. (Note: In 1897 Gabriel Sala documented an encounter with Amaringo, who was leading an expedition with four large canoes and twenty-five armed men. This group arrested a man who was traveling with Sala and owed money to Fitzcarrald.) Amaringo provided labor for this network by enslaving other native groups, which were then added into the rubber-extracting workforce. Slave raids from the Unini River were organized and were primarily focused in the Gran Pajonal area. (Note: Gabriel Sala noted that when he traveled through the Gran Pajonal region, he saw many burned-down houses or abandoned and came across numerous bands of indigenous slave hunters and their "white foremen".) Amaringo also organized punitive expeditions against other entrepreneurs with whom Fitzcarrald had disagreements. Fitzcarrald also had alliances with other Asháninka chiefs, who would capture and trade slaves. The rubber firms would advance supplies to Asháninka groups that had agreed to extract rubber; in this way, many natives became indebted to the firms. The Asháninka who did not agree to collect rubber were targets of correrias (slave raids). (Note: These methods were also practiced against other native groups, and Fitzcarrald had an alliance with at least four Piro chiefs on the Urubamba River.) Killing of indigenous men and enslavement of the women and children was common practice during these raids. (Note: "They would capture women and youths in particular, who formed precious trading objects, whilst adult men were eliminated as they would never form as malleable a workforce as the children, who were more easily and fully assimilated.") Some of the indigenous groups exploited by Fitzcarrald include Asháninka, Piro, and Harakmbut natives. (Note: The Piro and Harakmbut, which includes the Mashco, Toyeri and Araseri demographics, all speak Arawakan languages.)

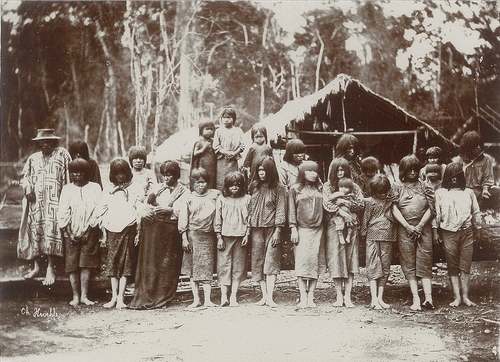
Piro natives near a tributary of the Pachitea River. This photograph was taken by Charles Kroehle in 1888.

Fitzcarrald became established as a rubber baron in the late 19th century; he managed rubber operations on the Pachitea, Upper Ucayali, Urubamba, Tambo, Apurimac and Madre de Dios rivers. He became known as the "King of Caucho" rubber, referring to latex extracted from Castilla elastica trees, which are not suitable for long-term exploitation. The most effective way of extracting rubber from this tree is to cut it down; this incentivized and necessitated constant movement for new sources of rubber trees.

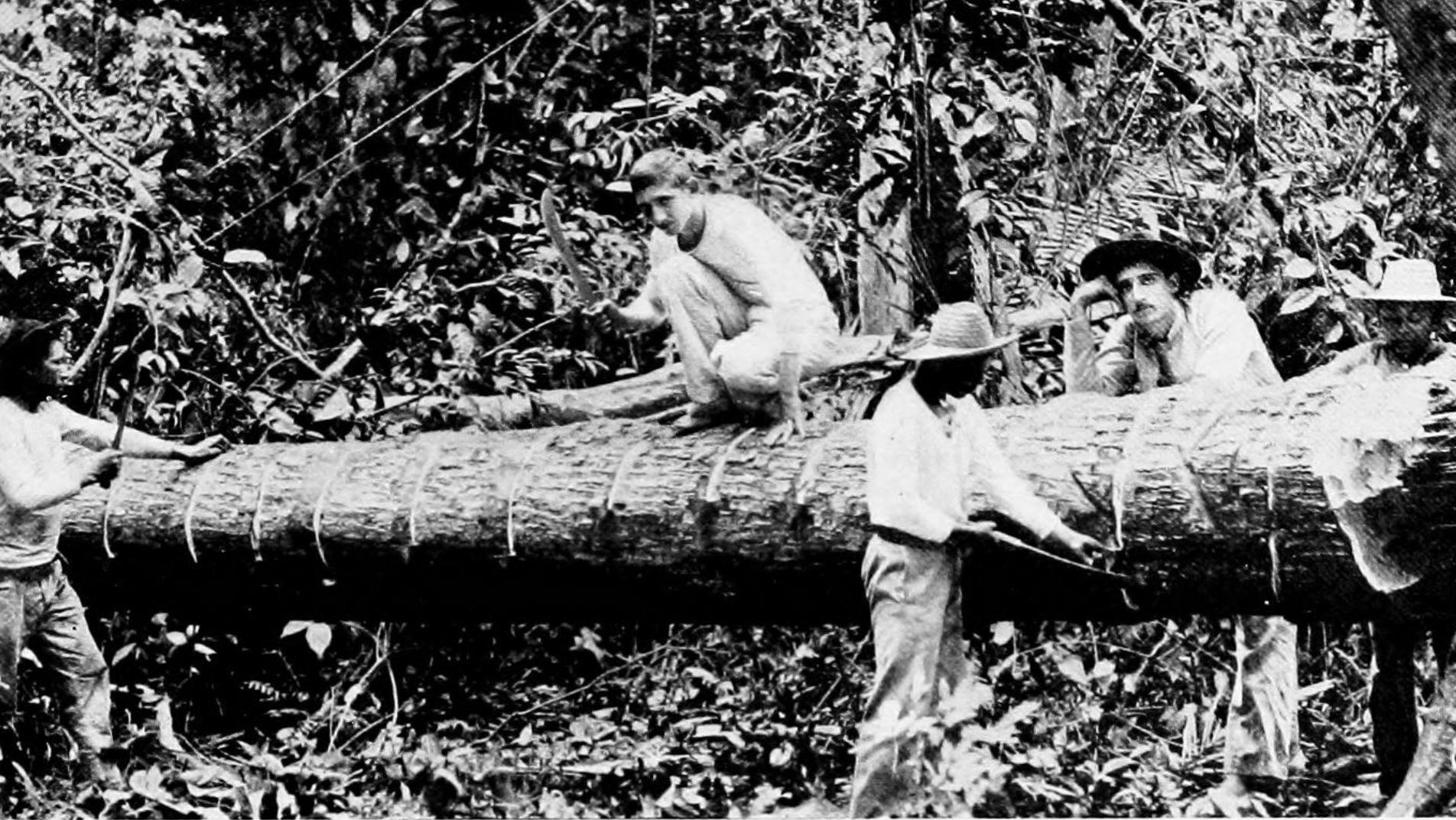
“The only practical method for obtaining the latex of the Caucho tree”

=== The Isthmus of Fitzcarrald ===
In 1892, Fitzcarrald established a rubber station on the Mishagua River, a tributary of the Urubamba River. In 1893, Fitzcarrald began looking for a portage route across the Mishagua River and another river. He had previously heard about a suitable path from information relayed to him by natives. (Note: George Earl Church stated Fitzcarrald had sent natives up river from the Ucayali to search for a path suitable for portage to the Purus River.) This was a short, direct route from the Urubamba River to a river that Fitzcarrald believed to be the Purus River. (Note: Fitzcarrald later discovered that this river was the Madre de Dios rather than the Purus River on his second journey, when he reached a Bolivian rubber station.)

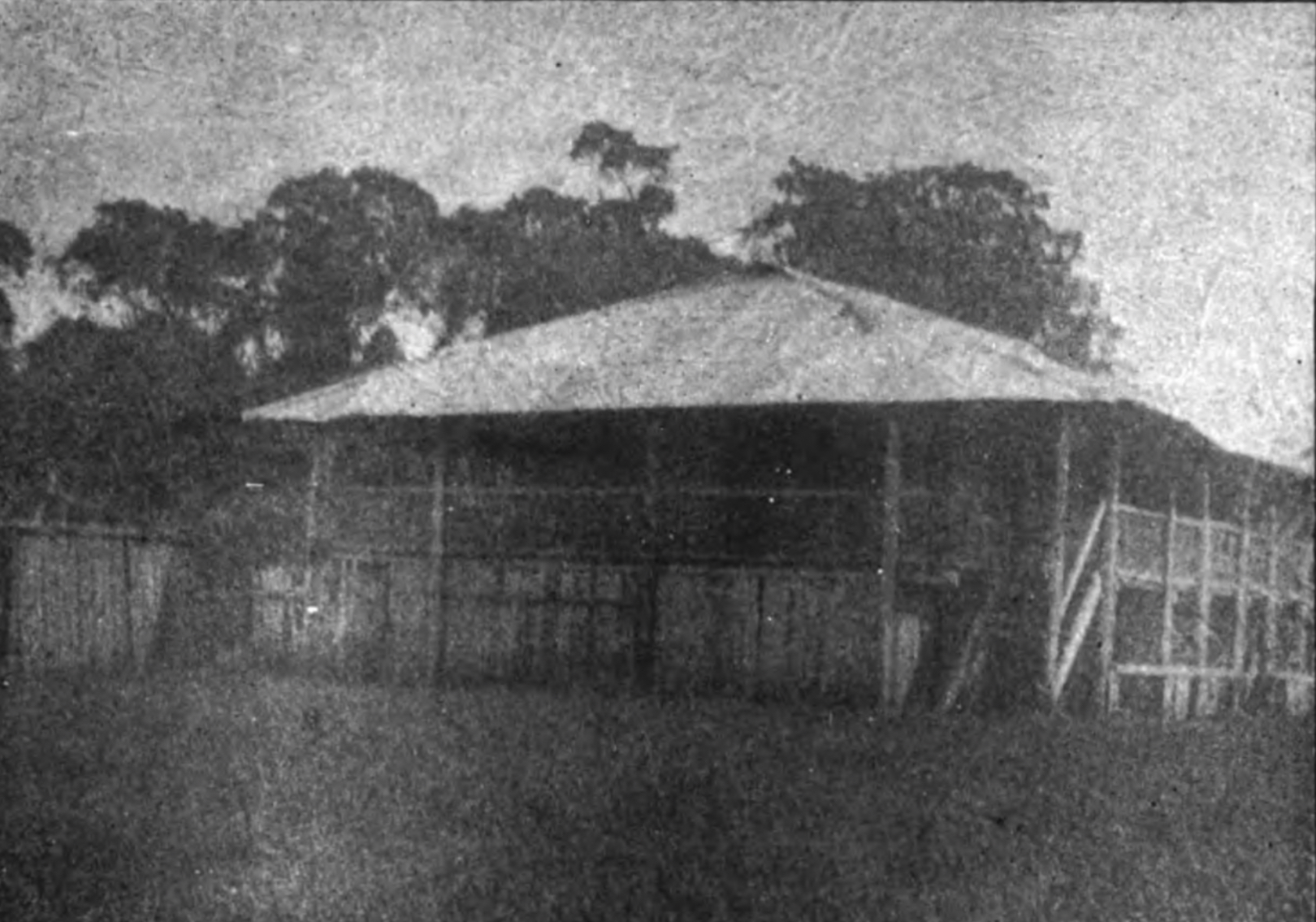
Casa Fiscarrald - at the confluence of Urubamba and Mishagua.

Fitzcarrald was credited with developing portage routes between the Mishagua River, and the Manu, a tributary of the Madre de Dios River. The former leads to the Ucayali River. This area later became known as the Isthmus of Fitzcarrald. Fitzcarrald and his enterprise explored the Madre de Dios region of BAP Fitzcarrald in Lake Sandoval, Madre de Dios, Peru. He is credited with founding the city of Puerto Maldonado, and he also explored the area that is now Manu Biosphere Reserve. The Asháninka chief Amaringo commanded the flotilla of the first expedition across the isthmus, which consisted of around 100 canoes. The Contamana, a three-ton steamship, was bought in Iquitos after Fitzcarrald returned from his first trip across the route.

On the second expedition in 1894, Fitzcarrald forced Piro and Asháninka natives, as well as around 100 non-natives, under the threat of death to dismantle the Contamana steamship and transport it over a mountain and across the isthmus. The portage of the Contamana took two months to complete. Ernesto de La Combe stated there were 300 Piros, 500 Asháninka, and 200 non-indigenous men on the second expedition. It took 600 men to drag the Contamana's hull across the isthmus; logs were placed underneath the boat so it was easier to transport. (Note: Roux's information corroborates that the steamship was transported on a "makeshift track" constructed from pieces of wood.)

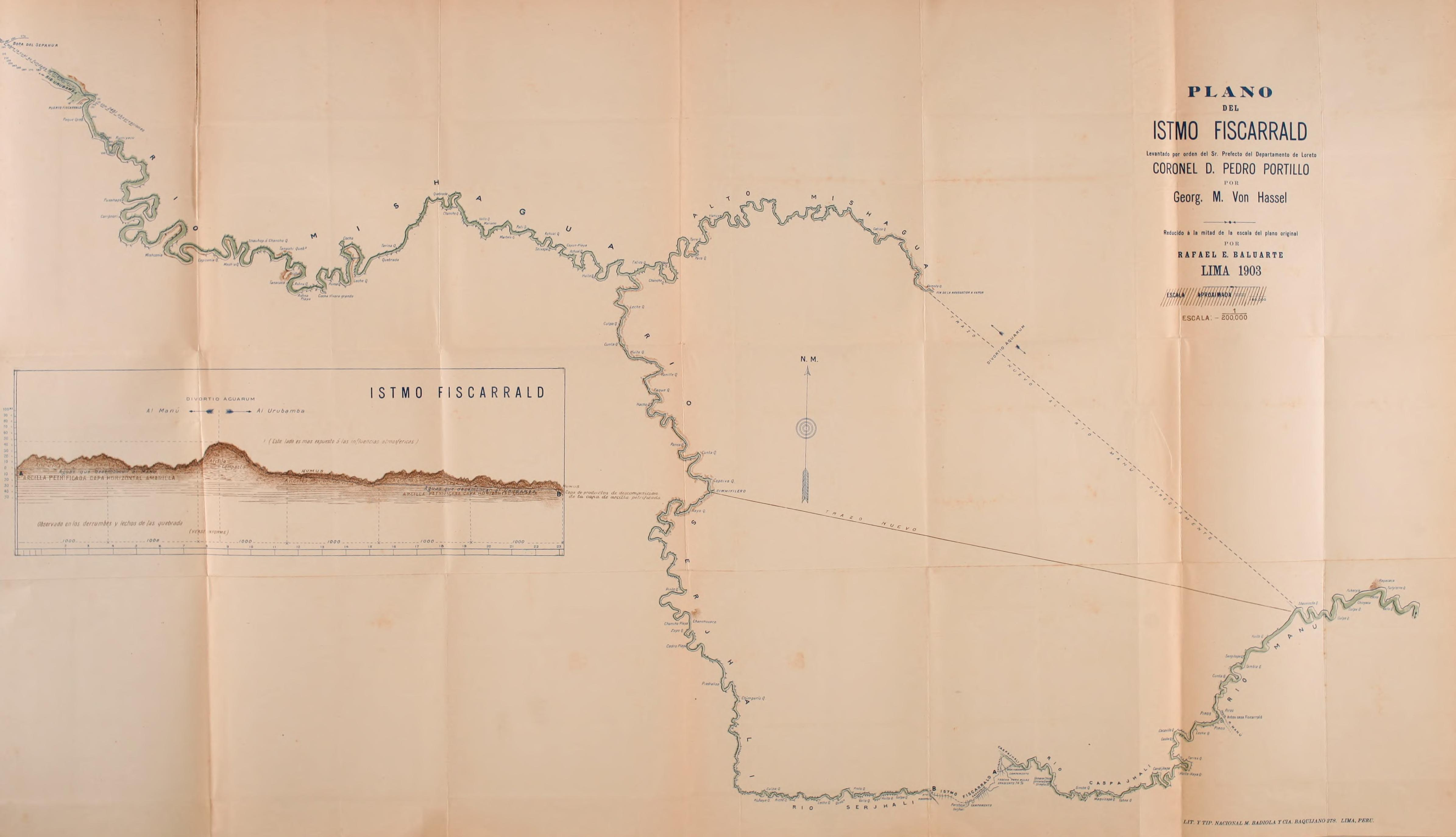
Map depicting the Isthmus of Fitzcarrald, circa 1904.

The establishment of the Isthmus of Fitzcarrald route enabled the transportation of rubber from the Madre de Dios region. Rubber was then transferred to ships on the Mishagua that could reach the Urubamba, the Ucayali River, and thereby sail down the Amazon to markets and Atlantic ports for export. The isthmus was attended to by Piro natives, who took on the portage and the shipment of goods across the route. Walking from one end of the isthmus to the other took around 55 minutes. Shipibo historian José Roque Maina collected oral testimony from Shipibo natives that "clearly describe their participation in the transport of Fitzcarrald's boat from the Ucayali to the Madre de Dios in 1895".

In an article titled "'Purús Song': Nationalization and Tribalization in Southwestern Amazonia", anthropologist Peter Gow refuted claims Fitzcarrald, and later his brother Delfín, discovered any portage routes. (Note: Delfín is credited with the discovery of a route between the Sepahua and Cujar Rivers.) According to Gow:

[t]hese were standard routes used by Piro people moving between river systems, and are regularly mentioned in the earlier literature... What the 'discoveries' related in the histories actually relate is the increasingly direct articulation of this trading system with the burgeoning rubber-extraction industry in the latter half of the 19th century.

=== In the Madre de Dios River basin ===
Fitzcarrald's expeditions into the Madre de Dios region are considered to be the cause of the modern-day division between local Yine and Mashco Piro peoples. (Note: Euclides da Cunha emphasized that Mashco-Piro was one of the groups enslaved by Fitzcarrald.) The Yine are the descendants of natives whom Fitzcarrald forced to work for him and the Mashco are the descendants of natives who fled following Fitzcarrald's arrival. According to Zacarías Valdez Lozano, who worked with Fitzcarrald, (Note: Valdez was Fitzcarrald's "right-hand man" and published his memoirs in 1944. Valdez began working with Fitzcarrald in 1891, when Valdez was 17 years old.) pressure from rubber barons had evicted the Mashcos from the Manu River. (Note: Some of the raids described by Valdez were not punitive in nature, but instead they were carried out with the intent of exterminating the native population with the exception of children. Anthropologist Klaus Rummenhoeller referred to Fitzcarrald as "the most bloodthirty of the caucheros of his era".) Valdez also wrote in his memoirs after a skirmish occurred on an unfamiliar river, Fitzcarrald named that river Colorado due to the redness of the water.

Anthropologist Stefano Varese described a strategy used by Fitzcarrald against the natives, stating:

With a deep knowledge of the mountain, he knew how to use traditional rivalries ... The method is simple: Winchesters are given to the Cunibo who must pay in Kampa slaves and then Winchesters are given to the Kampa who must pay in Cunibo [and other] slaves ... (Note: Guillermo Reaño stated that the figure of Carlos Fitzcarrald "represented the epitome of cruelty and indigenous exploitation in the Peruvian forests.")

Yesica Patiachi, an Indigenous educator, stated to the Harakmbut, Fitzcarrald "caused the greatest genocide of all time: on one day alone, 3,000 Harakbut were murdered, turning the rivers of our territory red".Anthropologist Søren Hvalkof also implicates Carlos Fitzcarrald in the genocide of Harakmbut natives. Hundreds of Toyeri and Araseri natives were massacred in this part of the Madre de Dios because they would not extract rubber for Fitzcarrald or permit his enterprise to travel through their territory. (Note: Toyeri is an extinct ethnic group which was a part of the Harákmbut demographic.) An unknown number of their villages were also destroyed. (Note: "Amongst other things, several hamlets were destroyed with machine guns.") Many Toyeri and Araseri natives fled the area to escape these attacks but the subsequent migrations led to other conflicts among indigenous groups. The atrocities perpetrated on behalf of Fitzcarrald were never subjected to a systematic inquiry or investigation during the rubber boom.

In 1894, most of the Mashco-Piro demographic were killed by men working for Fitzcarrald. According to Euclides da Cunha in his essay Os caucheros, Fitzcarrald, along with a Piro interpreter, attempted to persuade a Mashco chief it would be more advantageous to enter an alliance with Fitzcarrald than to fight. (Note: Euclides da Cunha provides the name of the location this incident happened, "Playa Mashcos".) The Mashco chief wanted to see the "arrows" they had brought and was handed a Winchester cartridge. He tried to injure himself with this bullet and after comparing it to an arrow of his own, which he stabbed into his arm, this chief walked away from Fitzcarrald with confidence. After a physical, half-hour-long conflict between the two groups, 100 Mashcos including the chief had been killed. Da Cunha described the small army that accompanied Fitzcarrald as "disparate physiognomies of the tribes he had subjugated". Dominican missionary José Álvarez provided details of another conflict between Fitzcarrald and a Mashco tribe that may have occurred during the same expedition as the one in the incident described by da Cunha. According to Álvarez:

After a beating of drums, Fitzcarrald replied, via an interpreter, that if the Mashco opposed him he would give them a good thrashing, right down to the tiniest baby ... the Indians retreated ... they tied objects (gifts brought by the rubber barons) to their arrowheads and, drawing their bows, fired them at the encampment ... All the tribes rose up to stop Fitzcarrald who, to put an end to the Mashco, prepared a raid with his captains Maldonado, Galdós and Sanchez ... In the Comerjali stream they took many prisoners; they executed, after a brief trial, 30 Mashco and destroyed 46 canoes ... (Note: Ernesto de la Combe corroborated that thirty Mashcos were executed, however his information states that more than ten canoes were destroyed in this incident.) Another day, the Mashco killed more than 100 people and so the rubber barons attacked them, by river and by land, with such violence that the Manu was covered in corpses ... you couldn’t draw water from the river for all the bodies of Mashco and rubber workers, because it was a war to the death. This took place in 1894.

There were also raids against natives on other tributaries of the Manu, most notably the Sahuinto, Sotileja, and Fierro. (Note: Stenfao Varese wrote: "Fitzcarrald, [who], scorning them and killing along the way some who opposed him, has established himself at the center of his domain".) Most of the indigenous men Fitzcarrald's enterprise found during their slave raids along the Manu River were killed. Some of these slave raids were against Guarayo natives. Fitzcarrald's captain Maldonado led a campaign in the Sahuinto area, where his group killed many Mashco men before enslaving their women and children. Captain Sanchez destroyed native farms, villages, and canoes on the Sotileja River.

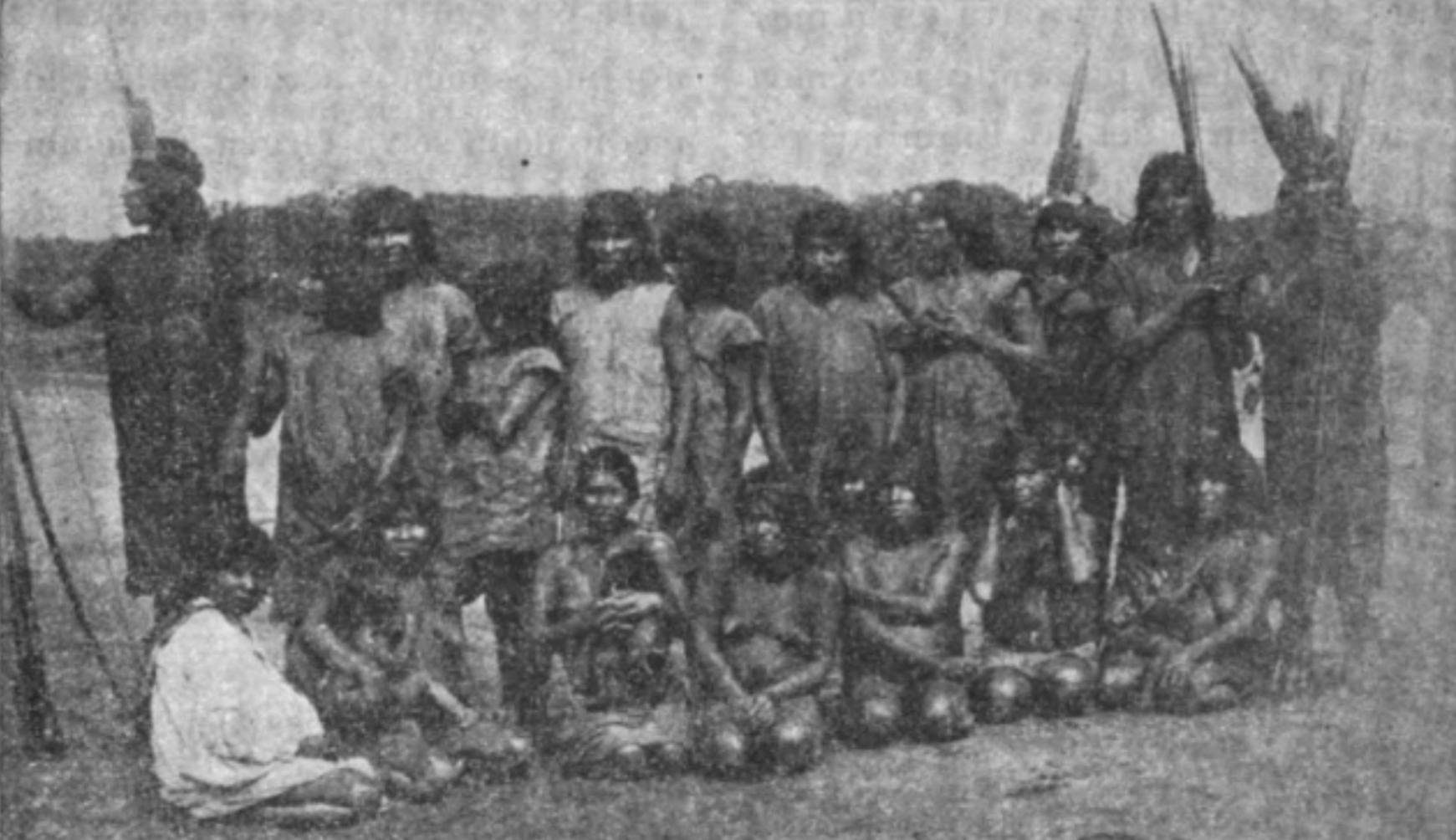
Group of Guarayo people near the Tambopata River, circa 1903.

=== Partnership with Bolivian rubber barons ===
On September 4, 1894, Fitzcarrald arrived at "El Carmen" rubber station on the Madre de Dios River, which the Bolivian rubber baron Nicolás Suárez Callaú owned. (Note: El Carmen is located at the confluence of the Sena and Madre de Dios Rivers.) Fitzcarrald had traveled on the steamship Contamana along with merchandise, which he offered to the Bolivians at lower rates than Suárez could find along the Madeira and Beni Rivers. The Isthmus provided a safer route for Suárez to export rubber. (Note: Ernesto de La Combe states that around fifty percent of the rubber transported [by natives on canoes] along the Madeira route was lost due to shipwrecks. This was largely due to the rapids locally known as cachuelas, which were significant obstructions for those navigating the Madeira River.) Suárez decided to invest 500,000 Bolivian pesos for the improvement and further development of the new route Fitzcarrald had established. (Note: According to Frederic Vallve's information, Suárez invested £25,000.)

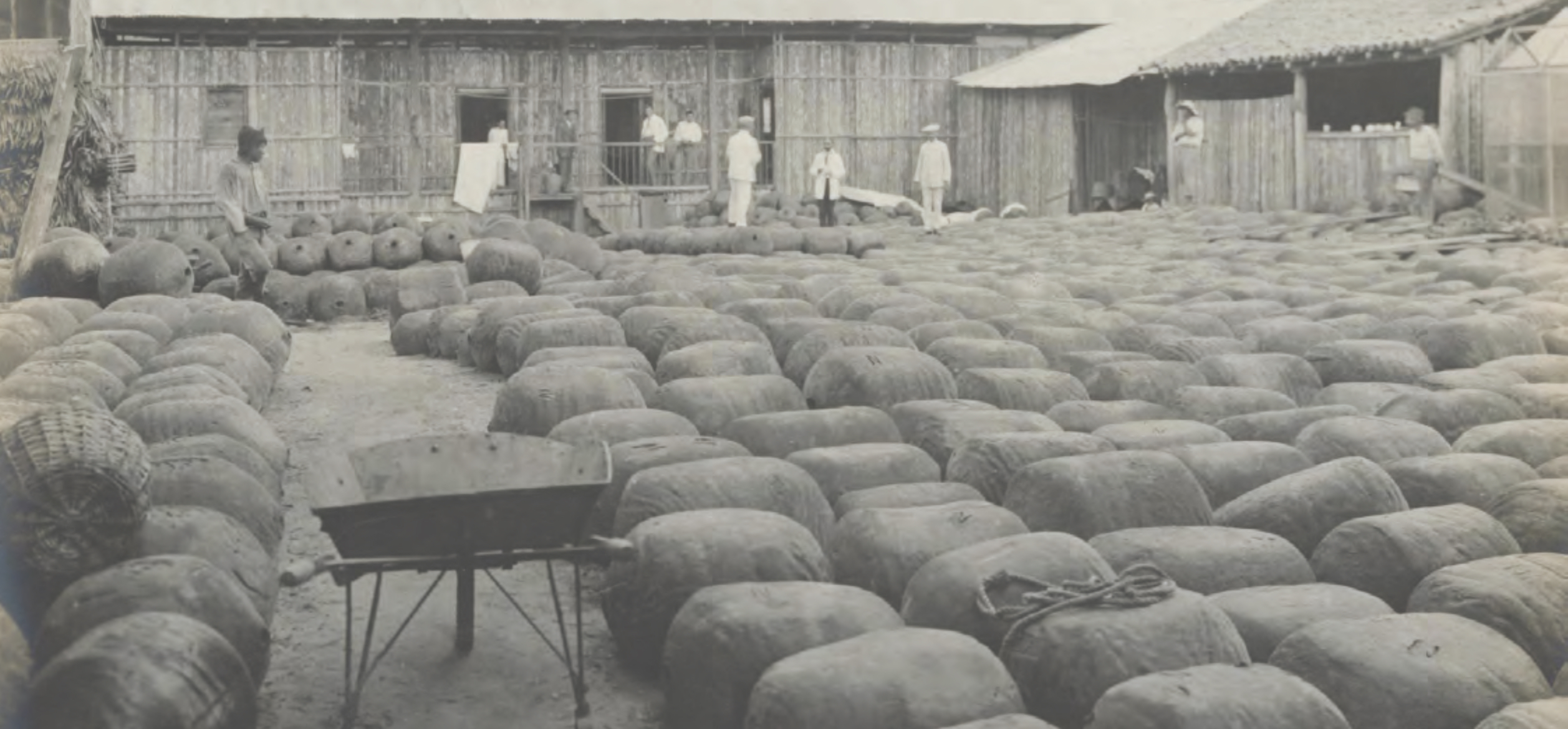
"Courtyard of the settlement of Mssrs. Suarez y Hermanos, filled with rubber biscuits ready for transportation."

Fitzcarrald later traveled further down the Madre de Dios River to the Orton River, where he met Antonio de Vaca Díez, who was a rubber baron and a senator for the Bolivian department of Beni. (Note: Vaca Díez was also the cousin of Nicolás Suárez.) Vaca Díez was invited into a developing business network, which would create an association of Peruvian, Bolivian, and Brazilian rubber exporters. Around 300 men were distributed at points ranging from 20 to 30 miles (32 to 48 km) between Mishagua and El Carmen to establish new supply stations, which would support the enterprise's operations in the area. (Note: Gabriel Sala estimated that there was around forty days worth of traveling between Mishagua and Cachuela Esperanza, which is where Nicolas Suárez had his headquarters.) An engineer named Manuel Balbastro was sent to the isthmus to establish a plan for a railway that would extend from Mishagua to the opposite side of the isthmus on the Manu River. (Note: Gabriel Sala misspells Manuel's name as Ballarto on page 95 of his book, this is corrected on page 198.) Balbastro estimated this project could cost up to four million Peruvian soles. (Note: According to Ernesto Reyna, this railway was designed to operate a Decauville locomotive.) The project was later abandoned because it was believed to be too expensive. Balbastro was persuaded to stay at Mishagua and work for Fitzcarrald's enterprise for a season; he later told Fray Sala about some of the atrocities and abuses he witnessed white caucheros perpetrate against natives. (Note: In his 1897 book, Sala did not elaborate on what Balbastro witnessed. Sala wrote "in this matter and in the business of human flesh, there is so much to correct, that it is better not to say anything, until the Supreme Government can operate more quickly on that plethora of scrambles ...")

Transportation on the Madre de Dios for this new partnership would be provided by the steamships La Esperanza, La Shiringa, and La Contamana; while on the Ucayali, the steamships Bermúdez, (Note: This was a 180-ton ship which Suárez purchased in Iquitos. Gabriel Sala traveled on this steamship through territory controlled by Fitzcarrald's enterprise.) La Unión, (Note: La Unión was a 60-ton steamship which Suárez ordered from Europe) Laura, Dorotea, (Note: This was a 22-ton ship.) a tugboat named Bolivar, (Note: This was purchased by Vaca Díez at Orton.) Cintra, and Adolfito launches (Note: The Cintra was a 5-ton ship, while the Adolfito was an 8-ton ship, both of which were purchased by Vaca Díez and brought to Iquitos at the beginning of 1897. He also had another ship named the Sernamby waiting for him in Bolivia. Adolfito was constructed in London and was specifically designed for navigation on Amazon rivers. A second boat was specially constructed in Europe for this enterprise but the source that refers to this boat does not provide a name.) would facilitate transportation. In 1895, Fitzcarrald chartered the steamship Hernán and transported 50,000 kg (110,000 lb) of rubber that year on a voyage to Iquitos. (Note: Ernesto Reyna stated that "the [Hernán] crossing from Iquitos to Mishagua took 310 hours, and the return in 86 [hours], carrying 50,000 kilos of rubber.) (Note: Hernán was chartered by Fitzcarrald from Wesche & Compania in 1894. This was the same company that sold the steamship Laura to Vaca Díez in 1897.) The steamship Contamana was sold to Fitzcarrald's new Bolivian associates but it sank on the same day of its sale due to unforeseen damage that occurred during its passage.

In 1896, the Peruvian government granted Fitzcarrald exclusive navigational rights to the Upper Ucayali, Urubamba, Manu, and Madre de Dios rivers. (Note: This was granted to Fitzcarrald by the Minister of War of Peru at the time, Colonel Juan T. Ibarra.) Suárez and Vaca Díez had to negotiate separately with Fitzcarrald so they could operate on the rivers he controlled. Suárez offered Fitzcarrald rubber-bearing lands on the Manu River in exchange for navigational rights. (Note: Fitzcarrald established rubber stations along the Panahua, Sotileja, Cumerjali, and Cashpajali tributaries on the Manu River.) Suárez and Fitzcarrald established a company named Suárez y Fiscarrald. Suárez' ships were also permitted to travel through the Urubamba-Ucayali River due to these negotiations. The same year, Vaca Díez traveled to London to register The Orton Rubber Co. and he intended to return to Bolivia with several new migrants who would work for him. (Note: Vaca Díez recruited around 500 migrants to travel with him across the Atlantic, however only 17 of them continued the journey with him past Iquitos.) Fitzcarrald and Vaca Díez met again in July 1897 near Mishagua, where they discussed business. (Note: According to German Albert Perl, who was navigating Adolfito, this meeting took place on July 8, 1897.)

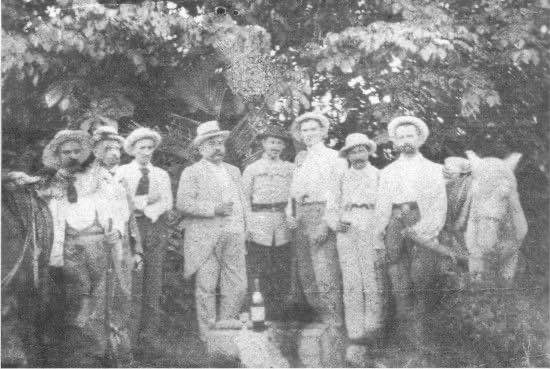
“Group taken in country. The fat one is Vaca Diez”

=== Death ===
Fitzcarrald died at age 35 on July 9, 1897, together with his Bolivian business partner Vaca Díez, when their ship Adolfito sank in the Urubamba River in an accident. (Note: Hessel stated the accident occurred after three days of traveling on the river from Mishagua.) They were traveling to Mishagua at the head of a convoy, and were being followed by the steamships Laura and Cintra. (Note: Vaca Díez and his group were traveling to the Orton River on the other side of the isthmus.) In a letter to her family, Lizzie Hessel, who witnessed the accident, wrote Fitzcarrald had boarded Adolfito to persuade Vaca Díez to travel on a canoe because Fitzcarrald did not have faith in the new steamship. Fitzcarrald was persuaded to stay on the ship with his business partner. Albert Perl, who was navigating the Adolfito, wrote that Fitzcarrald had boarded the steamship to wish the crew and passengers good morning; however, Fitzcarrald did not intend to travel with them as he felt safer with travelling with his natives by canoe. Perl stated that Fitzcarrald was persuaded to stay on board during the journey. (Note: The Adolfito had a music box, which played throughout the journey; and Perl described the atmosphere as festive.)

Perl wrote that at around 3:30 in the afternoon Adolfito came across a dangerous rapid, which became a fatal obstacle for the ship. Hessel also believed a chain broke on Adolfito and afterwards the ship lost control to the current. (Note: Ernesto Reyna also stated the rudder chain broke. Perl wrote that he could not control the rudder.) Perl wrote after the ship lost control in the current, it was slammed against rocks and then sank. Fitzcarrald's biographer Reyna stated Fitzcarrald was a "renowned swimmer" and had tried to save his friend Vaca Díez, who did not know how to swim. Perl wrote he saw "[b]oth Vaca-Diez and Fizcarrald swung through the windows into the raging flood". Perl was caught in a whirlpool from which he managed to escape, unlike Fitzcarrald. Fitzcarrald's body was found days later and was buried in the forest. He was reburied two years later in a cemetery in Iquitos.

Hessel wrote that Fitzcarrald's wife blamed the group of travelers who were accompanying Vaca Díez for Fitzcarrald's death, because he had arranged accommodations for this group. (Note: Hessel also stated that after the death of Fitzcarrald, his wife was physically abusing natives, some of whom were chained to her bed at night so they could not run away.) Ernesto Reyna blamed Perl, who was piloting Adolfito at the time, for the accident. Tony Morrison, who compiled and edited Lizzie Hessel's letters, speculated the river accident may have been planned and said "convenient accidents" were a business tactic used by rubber barons. (Note: Suárez used the fact that both of his partners had died as justification for Suárez acquiring all of the assets belonging to the partnership.) After July 1897, some of the remaining Mashco and Guarayo natives along the Madre de Dios River began attacking canoes and raiding settlements established by Fitzcarrald's enterprise. (Note: Albert Perl said after Fitzcarrald's death, natives around Mishagua became rebellious and were attacking caucheros and their families.) The Mashcos were able to assume control over the isthmus and burned down rubber stations, killed mules that provided transportation on the route, and damaged infrastructure that Fitzcarrald's enterprise had established. (Note: After the death of Fitzcarrald and Vaca Diez, Suárez began to primarily export his rubber through the Madeira route again.)

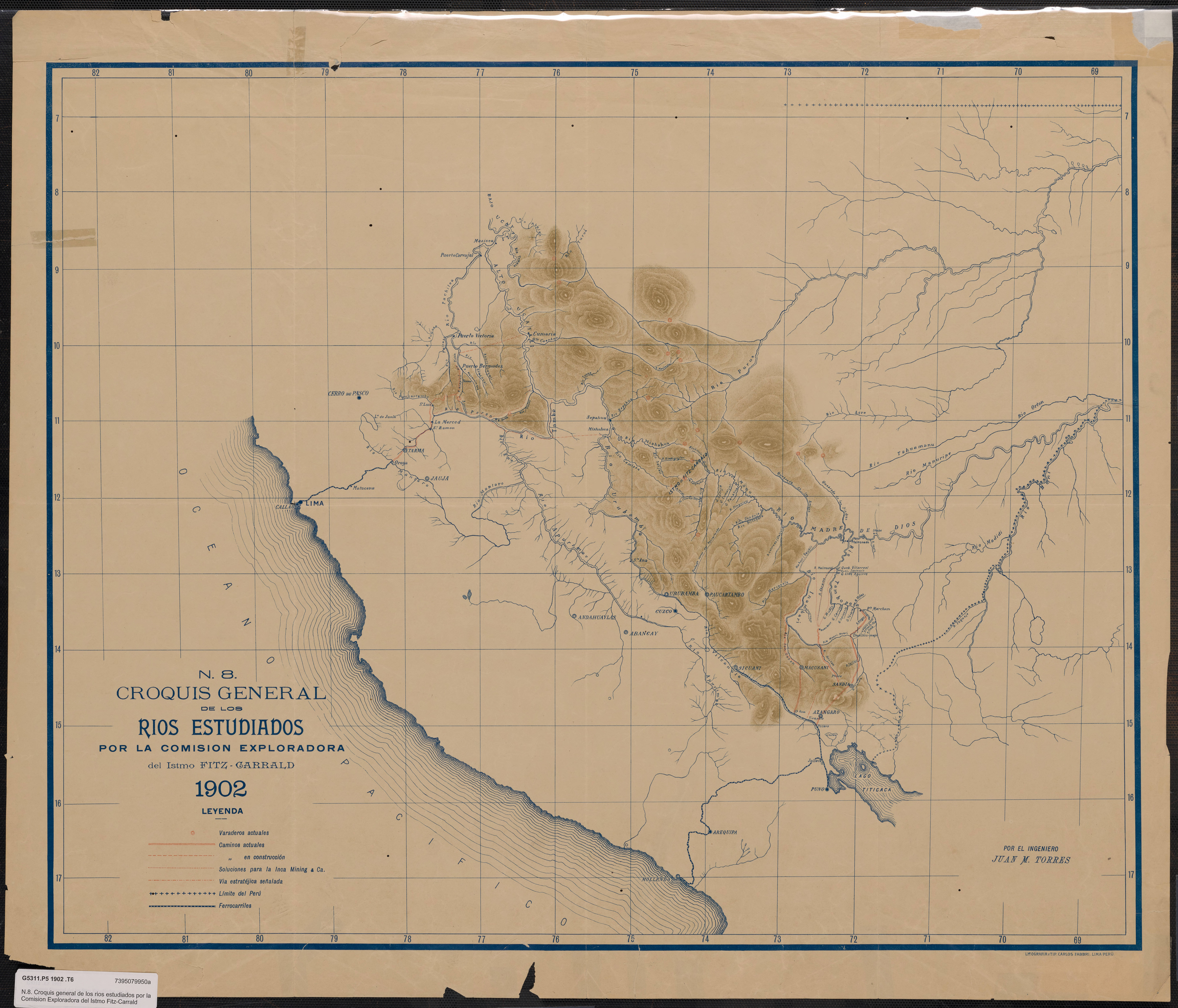
Map by the Fitz-Carrald Isthmus Exploratory Commission, circa 1902.

== Legacy ==
Both Fitzcarrald and Vaca Díez had a business relationship with Suárez, who was the primary benefactor of the accident. Suárez absorbed a substantial portion of Fitzcarrald's fleet, (Note: This included the steamships Shiringa, Esperanza, and Campa. Campa arrived at the area of operations after Fitzcarrald's death.) along with many of his Peruvian personnel; Suárez soon became the largest exporter of rubber in Bolivia. Suárez laid claim to assets owned by Fitzcarrald's enterprise, and began excursions into Peruvian-held territory on the Madre de Dios and Ucayali Rivers. The Orton Rubber Co., which Vaca Díez founded, was absorbed into Suárez's company. Anthropologist Alberto Chirif said a significant factor for the variability of the rubber boom's impacts on the Amazon is due to the 1897 shipwreck that killed Fitzcarrald and Vaca Díez.

The remainder of Fitzcarrald's enterprise came under the direction of his brother Delfín Fitzcarrald, and Carlos Fitzcarralds's foremen Carlos Scharff and Leopoldo Collazos. The Asháninka chief Venancio Amaringo continued to work with this enterprise after the death of Delfín Fitzcarrald in 1900. (Note: The 1915 edition of judge Carlos A. Valcárcel's El proceso del Putumayo y sus secretos inauditos corroborates the fact Delfín's death occurred three years after his brother Carlos died.) The establishment of the portage route between the Urubamba and the Purus Rivers was disputed between Delfín Fitzcarrald and Leopoldo Collazos. Delfín was killed in an ambush upon returning from his first trip to the Purus River.

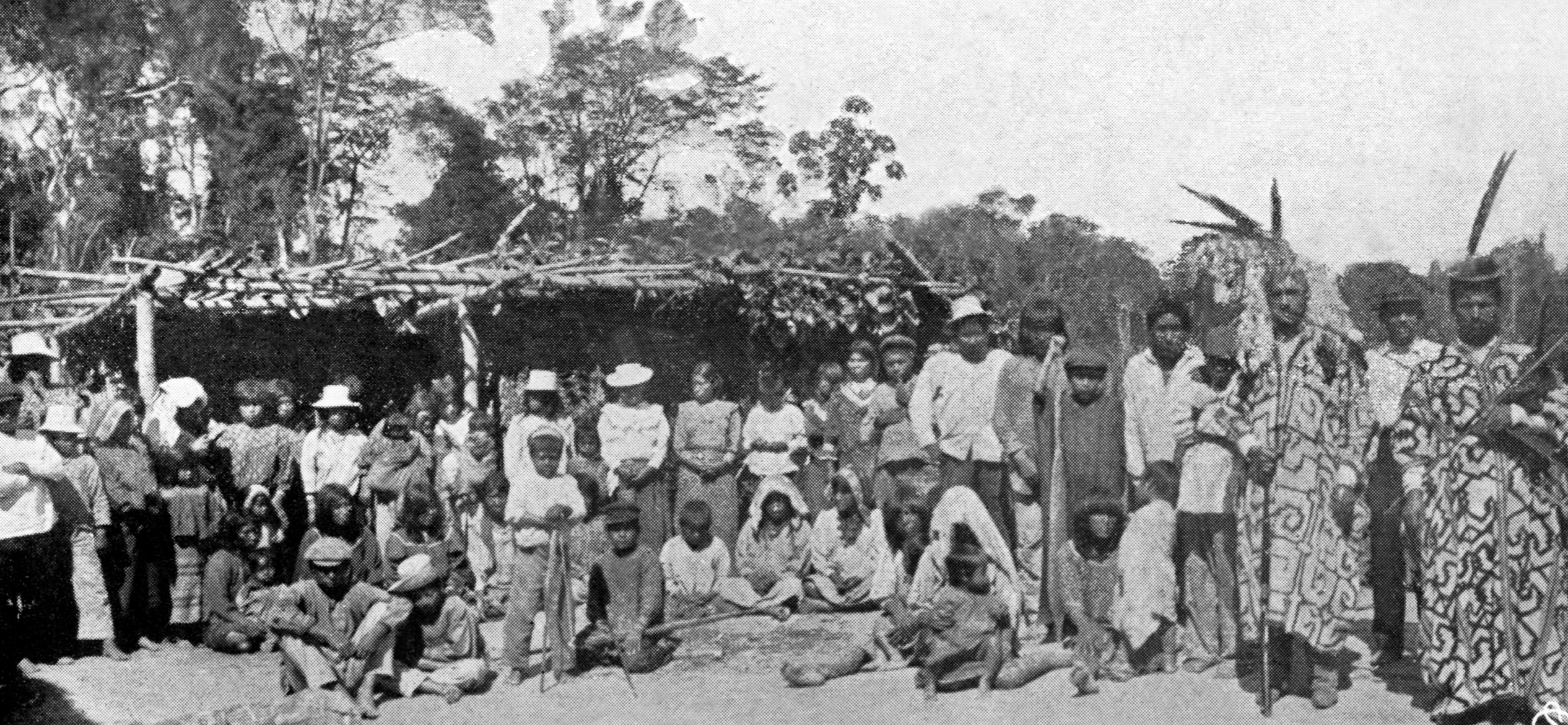
“Piro workers at Carlos Scharff’s house in Curanja, 1905”

Scharff acquired control over an unknown number of Piro natives who were initially enslaved by the Fitzcarrald family. Around 1903, a dispute over which location Scharff was shipping his rubber to turned into a conflict between Scharff and the Fitzcarrald family. This issue later escalated into a border conflict between Peru and Brazil. (Note: A portion of the Fitzcarrald enterprise was acquired by the mother-in-law of Carlos Fitzcarrald. This included large swathes of territory in the Purus and Acre River, which became subject to Brazil due to the actions of Fitzcarrald's mother-in-law.) Another brother of Carlos Fitzcarrald, Lorenzo, was murdered by bandits in 1905 on his way back to San Luis. Lorenzo had been managing operations for a rubber enterprise in the years leading up to his death. (Note: Lorenzo was returning to the family home at San Luis with the money he had made while working in the rubber industry. The exact circumstances of his death are unknown, and his body was never found.)

Velazco moved to Paris to oversee the upbringing of the children she had with Carlos Fitzcarrald. (Note: Together, Aurora and Carlos Fitzcarrald had four children.) At least two of their sons, Federico and José, were educated in that city. Velazco also established a hotel in Paris. In 1915, Federico and José controlled a large workforce of Asháninka natives at the Casa Fitzcarrald, which was located at the confluence of the Urubamba and Tambo Rivers. (Note: Federico and José returned to Peru in the early 1910s and assumed operational control over what remained of their father's enterprise. This was after the deaths of their uncles Delfín and Lorenzo.) Sometime during that year, the Casa Fitzcarrald and two brothers were attacked in an indigenous rebellion; newspapers initially reported the brothers were killed along with their family. The attackers took as many rifles and as much ammunition as they could carry with them. Later reports stated Federico and José survived the attack, and had organized an eighty-two-man retaliatory expedition against natives. Casa Fitzcarrald was one of the few rubber exporting enterprises to survive the revolt in 1915 and continue operating.

Human trafficking persisted in the Ucayali and Atalaya areas as late as 1988. In 1987, anthropologist Søren Hvalkof discovered members of the Scharff family related to Carlos Fitzcarrald's foreman Carlos Scharff were still participating in debt bondage. Søren Hvalkof said the local reputation of Fitzcarrald and Scharff in the Ucayali area sanctioned the exploitative treatment of natives in that region. According to Hvalkof:

In spite of their crimes, these rubber barons are still national heroes today. In Ucayali and Atalaya they are set up as the models of civilised behaviour. Their culture was refined, they were educated, they knew how to conduct themselves and were forceful. Pianos and velvet furniture. Thus the lines of conduct and rapport with the indigenous population in Atalaya were defined and sanctioned by "public opinion" for many years.

== Biographies ==
Ernesto Reyna published the first biography of Carlos Fitzcarrald, titled Fitzcarrald, el rey del caucho, in 1942. Some of this information was disputed by Zacarías Valdez Lozano in 1944, who gave his account of events in a book in Spanish titled El verdadero Fitzcarrald ante la historia. Valdez denied Fitzcarrald had to use the myth of the "amachengua" to dominate Asháninka natives. (Note: Valdez wrote "[i]n the life of Fitzcarrald, there was nothing of fantasy or legend".) Gabriel Sala first reported these rumors in 1897, and they were included in Reyna's biography; Valdez denied this claim but did not offer an explanation of the use of this myth. Anthropologist Michael Fobes Brown said chiefs like Amaringo, who worked for Fitzcarrald, may have used these rumors but he states that whether or not those figures were familiar enough with the concept of an "amachengua" to exploit this belief may never be known. Another biography of Fitzcarrald was published in 2015 by Rafael Otero Mutín; this is regarded as being better documented than Reyna's book.

"Lizzie: A Victorian Lady's Amazon Adventure" is a collection of letters from Elizabeth Mathys Hessel and her husband Fred Hessel to their family in England. Fred Hessel was hired by Antonio de Vaca Díez and traveled with Díez on his return trip from Europe. This book discusses the partnership between Carlos Fitzcarrald, Vaca Díez, and Nicolas Suarez, and includes an eyewitness account of the Adolfito accident.

== In popular culture ==
- The Carlos Fermín Fitzcarrald Province was named after him.
- Puerto Maldonado has a place to view the sunken remains of Fitzcarrald's steamship, the Contamana, which is located in the Madre de Dios River.
- Fitzcarrald's disassembly and transport over a mountainous jungle land bridge, as well as his exploits, inspired director and writer Werner Herzog's film Fitzcarraldo (1982), which symbolizes the extremes generated during the rubber boom and takes Fitzcarrald's symbolic transport of a disassembled ship to an explicit hyperbole by dragging an entire steamboat over a mountain. The character based on Fitzcarrald, called "Brian Sweeney Fitzgerald" in the film, is played by Klaus Kinski.

== See also ==
- Abuses against the Putumayo Indians
- Roger Casement
- Nicolás Suárez Callaú
- Julio César Arana
- Carlos Scharff

== Bibliography ==
- "Boletín de la Sociedad Geográfica de Lima". Boletín de la Sociedad Geográfica de Lima. 32 (4). 1917.
- Chirif, Alberto; Reaño, Guillermo (2019). Peru: Deforestation in Times of Climate Change. The International Work Group for Indigenous Affairs.
- Church, George (1904). "The Acre Territory and the Caoutchouc Region of South-Western Amazonia". Geographical Journal. 23 (5): 596–613. Bibcode:1904GeogJ..23..596C. doi:10.2307/1776006. JSTOR 1776006.
- Curtis Farabee, William (1922). Indian Tribes of Eastern Peru. Read Books. ISBN 978-0-527-01216-8.
- Dávila Francia, Jesús (2021). "Los dominicos y los pueblos indígenas de Madre de Dios". Arqueologia y Sociedad (in Spanish). 34 (34): 225–239. doi:10.15381/arqueolsoc.2021n34.e20628. S2CID 238844015.
- Eduardo, Fernández; Fobes Brown, Michael (1991). War of Shadows The Struggle for Utopia in the Peruvian Amazon. University of California Press. ISBN 978-0-520-07435-4.
- Ferguson, Brian (2000). War in the Tribal Zone Expanding States and Indigenous Warfare. School of American Research Press.
- Fifer, Valerie (1970). "The Empire Builders: A History of the Bolivian Rubber Boom and the Rise of the House of Suarez". Journal of Latin American Studies. 2 (2): 113–146. doi:10.1017/S0022216X00005095. JSTOR 156583. S2CID 145187884.
- García Hierro, Pedro; Hvalkof, Søren; Gray, Andrew (1998). Liberation through land rights in the Peruvian Amazon. The International Work Group for Indigenous Affairs.
- Gow, Peter (2006). ""Purús Song": Nationalization and Tribalization in Southwestern Amazonia". Tipiti: Journal of the Society for the Anthropology of Lowland South America. 4 (1).
- Gow, Peter (2001). An Amazonian myth and its history. Oxford University Press. ISBN 978-0-19-924196-5.
- Gray, Andrew (1996). The Arakmbut--mythology, Spirituality, and History. Berghahn Books. ISBN 978-1-57181-876-8.
- Hecht, Susanna (2013). The Scramble for the Amazon and the Lost Paradise of Euclides Da Cunha. University of Chicago Press. ISBN 978-0-226-32283-4.
- Hessel, Lizzie; Morrison, Tony; Brown, Ann; Rose, Anne (1987). Lizzie: a Victorian lady's Amazon adventure. New York: Parkwest Publications; London: British Broadcasting Corp.
- Huertas Castillo, Beatriz (2004). Indigenous peoples in isolation in the Peruvian Amazon. The International Work Group for Indigenous Affairs.
- Junta de Vías Fluviales (1904). El istmo de Fiscarrald (in Spanish). Impr. La Industria.
- Kozikoski Valereto, Deneb (2018). Aporias of Mobility: Amazonian Landscapes between Exploration and Engineering (Thesis). Columbia University Libraries. doi:10.7916/D8QV540Q.
- Lawrence, Clayton (1999). Peru and the United States The Condor and the Eagle. University of Georgia Press. ISBN 978-0-8203-2024-3.
- Lino e Silva, Moisés; Wardle, Huon (2016). Freedom in Practice Governance, Autonomy and Liberty in the Everyday. Taylor & Francis. ISBN 978-1-317-41549-7.
- Manuel Piedrafita Iglesias, Marcelo (2010). Os kaxinawa de felizardo correias trabalho e civilização no alto jurua. Universidade Federal do Rio de Janeiro.
- Marcos de Almeida, Matos (2018). Organização e história dos Manxineru do alto rio Iaco (PhD) (in Portuguese). Federal University of Santa Catarina.
- Moore, Thomas; Rummenhöller, Klaus; Chavarría, María (2020). Madre de Dios refugio de pueblos originarios. USAID. ISBN 978-9972-9753-1-8.
- Perl, Albert (1904). Durch die Urwälder Südamerikas (in German). De Gruyter, Incorporated. ISBN 978-3-11-111193-3.
- Reyna, Ernesto (1942). Fitzcarrald, el rey del caucho (in Spanish). Taller graf́ico de P. Barrantes C.
- Roux, Jean-Claude (1994). L'Amazonie Peruvie Ne Un Eldorado dévoré par la forêt 1821-1910 (PDF). Editions L'Harmattan.
- Rummenhoeller, Klaus (2003). Los Pueblos Indígenas de Madre de Dios: Historia, etnografía y coyuntura. IWGIA.
- Sala, Gabriel (1897). Apuntes de viaje del R. P. Fr. Gabriel Sala (in Spanish). Impr. La "Industria".
- Santos Granero, Fernando; Barclay, Frederica (2002). La frontera domesticada : historia económica y social de Loreto, 1850-2000. Pontificia Universidad Católica del Perú. Fondo Editorial. ISBN 9972-42-404-9.
- Santos-Granero, Fernando (2018). Slavery and Utopia The Wars and Dreams of an Amazonian World Transformer. University of Texas Press. ISBN 978-1-4773-1643-6.
- Valcárcel, Carlos (1915). El proceso del Putumayo y sus secretos inauditos. Putumayo: IWGIA. ISBN 978-9972-9410-9-2.
- Vallve, Frederic (2010). "The Economics of Rubber and the Habilito System". The impact of the rubber boom on the Bolivian Lowlands (1850-1920) (dissertation). Georgetown University.
- Varese, Stefano (2004). Salt of the Mountain Campa Asháninka History and Resistance in the Peruvian Jungle. University of Oklahoma Press. ISBN 978-0-8061-3512-0.
