= Puerto Maldonado =

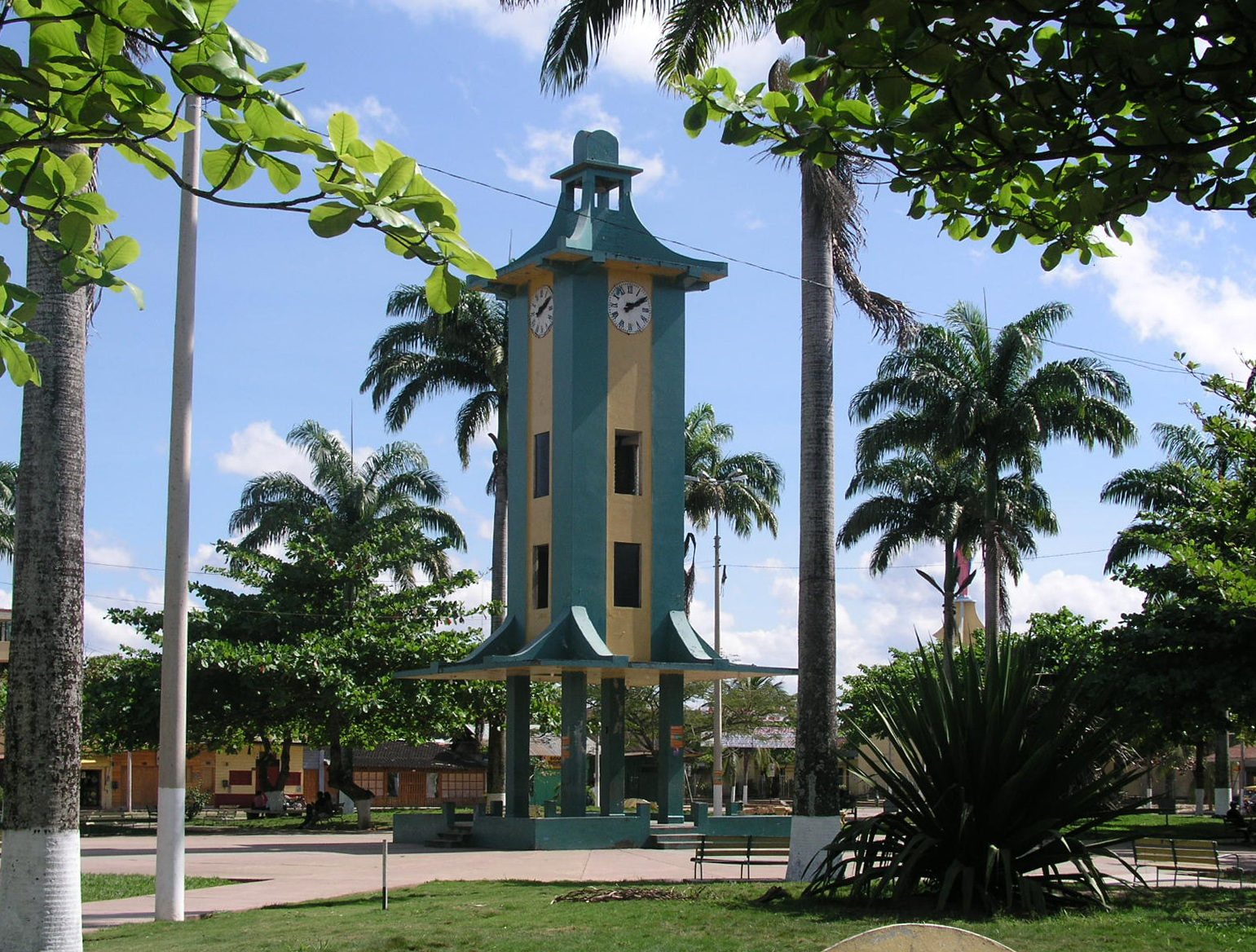
- Central Plaza in Puerto Maldonado

- Flag

- Location within Peru Location within South America
- Coordinates: 12°36′0″S 69°11′0″W
- Country: Peru
- Department: Madre de Dios
- Province: Tambopata
- Founded: July 10, 1902

Government
  - Mayor: Keler Rengifo

Area
  - Total: 85,183 km^{2} (32,889 sq mi)
- Elevation: 183 m (600 ft)

Population (2017)
  - Total: 85,024
  - Estimate (2015): 74,494
  - Density: 0.99813/km^{2} (2.5852/sq mi)
- Time zone: UTC-5

Puerto Maldonado (Spanish pronunciation: [ˈpweɾto maldoˈnaðo]) is a city in southeastern Peru in the Amazon rainforest 55 kilometres (34 mi) west of the Bolivian border, located at the confluence of the Tambopata and Madre de Dios rivers. The latter river joins the Madeira River as a tributary of the Amazon. This city is the capital of the Department of Madre de Dios.

Nearby are the Manu National Park, Tambopata National Reserve, and Bahuaja-Sonene National Park, which have been established to protect natural resources. These are some of the most pristine primary rain forests in the world. They include several oxbow lakes and clay licks, where hundreds of birds, including macaws, feed on clay. Among the indigenous peoples in this area are the Machiguenga.

== History ==
Because it was less accessible by major rivers, the department of Madre de Dios was among the later ones to be explored during the late-19th-century rubber boom in the Amazonian Basin. Rubber barons active in this business included Peruvian Carlos Fermín Fitzcarrald of Iquitos, as well as Brazilian and Bolivian interests. The workers for tapping rubber brought in endemic European diseases, causing epidemics and high fatalities among the indigenous peoples along the Manu River from 1889 to 1892, as they had never been exposed to these diseases before. Another epidemic occurred in 1896.

Fitzcarrald in his exploration found a short passage overland between the Mishagua, a tributary of the Urubamba River, and the Manu River, a tributary of the Madre de Dios River. This land was named as the Isthmus of Fitzcarrald after him. Transporting rubber across it enabled the product to be transferred to ships that could go down the Madre de Dios, connect to the Madeira River, a tributary of the Amazon, and thereby reach Atlantic ports and export markets. He also identified present-day Puerto Maldonado as a strategic location. He died in 1897 when his ship Contamana sank at a point in the river, where Puerto Maldonado was later founded.

In 1901, the Peruvian Government created a committee to explore possibilities to exploit the nation's rainforests. Don Juan Villalta led an expedition along the Tambopata River, departing from Sandia. Villata officially founded Puerto Maldonado on 10 July 1902, as a station at the confluence of the Tambopata and the Madre de Dios rivers. He named the port after Faustino Maldonado, of Tarapoto, who had explored the Madre de Dios in 1861 and drowned in the rapids of the Mamoré River.

The Department of Madre de Dios was created by law on 26 December 1912, with Puerto Maldonado as its capital. The city was formally recognized in 1985.

== Geography ==
=== Climate ===
Puerto Maldonado is in the tropical Amazon Basin. The average yearly temperatures and the average yearly rainfall give it a tropical rainforest climate. The weather is usually warm and always humid. The average annual temperature is 26 °C (79 °F), with the months of August and September being the hottest. Annual rainfall exceeds 2,000 millimetres (79 in). The wet season is from October to April. It has a tropical monsoon climate (Am in the Köppen climate classification).

The main part of the town is located on a slightly elevated area that does not normally flood in the wet season. Road travel often becomes impossible during this time. A low water season occurs between June and August.

A common phenomenon, known locally as a surazo or friaje, occurs when polar winds blow in from the mountainous south. The temperature drops to as low as 8 °C (46 °F) for several days.

Climate data for Puerto Maldonado (1961-1990, extremes 1958-1995)
| Month | Jan | Feb | Mar | Apr | May | Jun | Jul | Aug | Sep | Oct | Nov | Dec | Year |
|---|---|---|---|---|---|---|---|---|---|---|---|---|---|
| Record high °C (°F) | 36.7 (98.1) | 36.0 (96.8) | 36.5 (97.7) | 36.6 (97.9) | 37.0 (98.6) | 38.7 (101.7) | 39.2 (102.6) | 38.1 (100.6) | 40.0 (104.0) | 39.4 (102.9) | 39.0 (102.2) | 39.5 (103.1) | 40.0 (104.0) |
| Mean daily maximum °C (°F) | 30.9 (87.6) | 30.7 (87.3) | 31.0 (87.8) | 30.7 (87.3) | 29.8 (85.6) | 29.0 (84.2) | 29.6 (85.3) | 31.2 (88.2) | 32.0 (89.6) | 32.0 (89.6) | 31.6 (88.9) | 31.1 (88.0) | 30.8 (87.4) |
| Mean daily minimum °C (°F) | 21.4 (70.5) | 21.2 (70.2) | 20.9 (69.6) | 20.3 (68.5) | 18.8 (65.8) | 17.4 (63.3) | 16.8 (62.2) | 17.8 (64.0) | 18.8 (65.8) | 20.4 (68.7) | 21.1 (70.0) | 21.3 (70.3) | 19.7 (67.5) |
| Record low °C (°F) | 15.0 (59.0) | 14.0 (57.2) | 13.0 (55.4) | 11.5 (52.7) | 7.0 (44.6) | 7.0 (44.6) | 4.5 (40.1) | 7.4 (45.3) | 4.7 (40.5) | 13.0 (55.4) | 13.0 (55.4) | 15.5 (59.9) | 4.5 (40.1) |
| Average rainfall mm (inches) | 342.6 (13.49) | 333.4 (13.13) | 274.9 (10.82) | 154.2 (6.07) | 105.5 (4.15) | 57.6 (2.27) | 56.8 (2.24) | 63.3 (2.49) | 98.1 (3.86) | 164.4 (6.47) | 236.9 (9.33) | 279.3 (11.00) | 2,167 (85.31) |
Source 1: NOAA
Source 2: CIIFEN (record highs and lows) (Note: Station ID for El Puerto Maldonado is 109)

== Industry ==
The chief industries in Puerto Maldonado are logging, artisanal small-scale gold mining, Brazil nut collecting, boat building, and eco-tourism. The area is virtually logged out; only one mill remains. The area was at one time known for its mahogany.

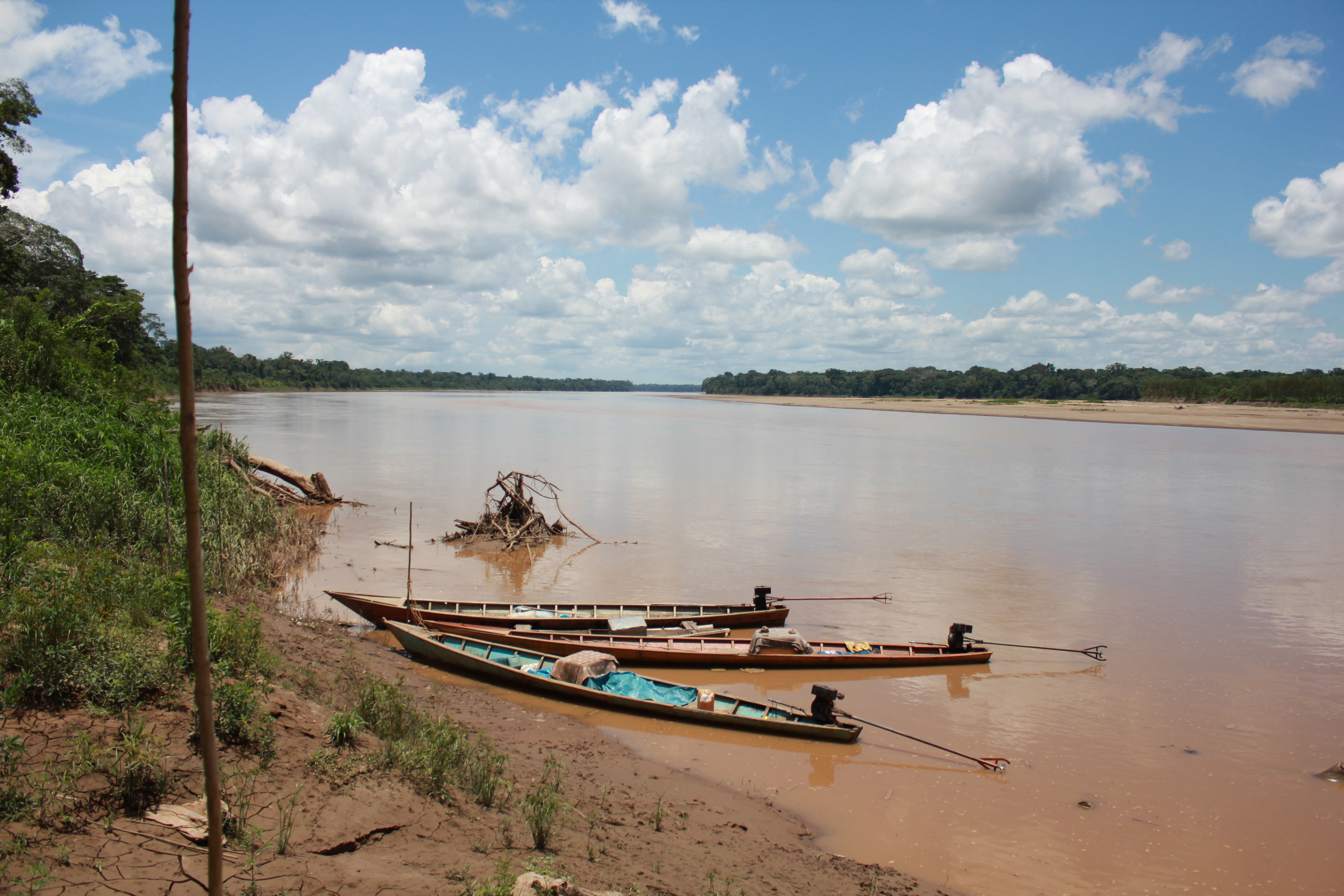
Puerto Maldonado

The area was exploited for collection of latex (rubber) by tapping trees in the late 19th-century and early 20th-century rubber boom, but South American production was undercut after seeds were smuggled out and rubber plantations were developed in southeast Asia. Rubber collection has long since ended.

At least 30,000 gold miners are active in the region around Puerto Maldonado.

Tourism and related boat construction are the major sources of income in the early 21st-century economy. Several tourist eco-lodges are located around Puerto Maldonado and in the reserves.

== Infrastructure ==
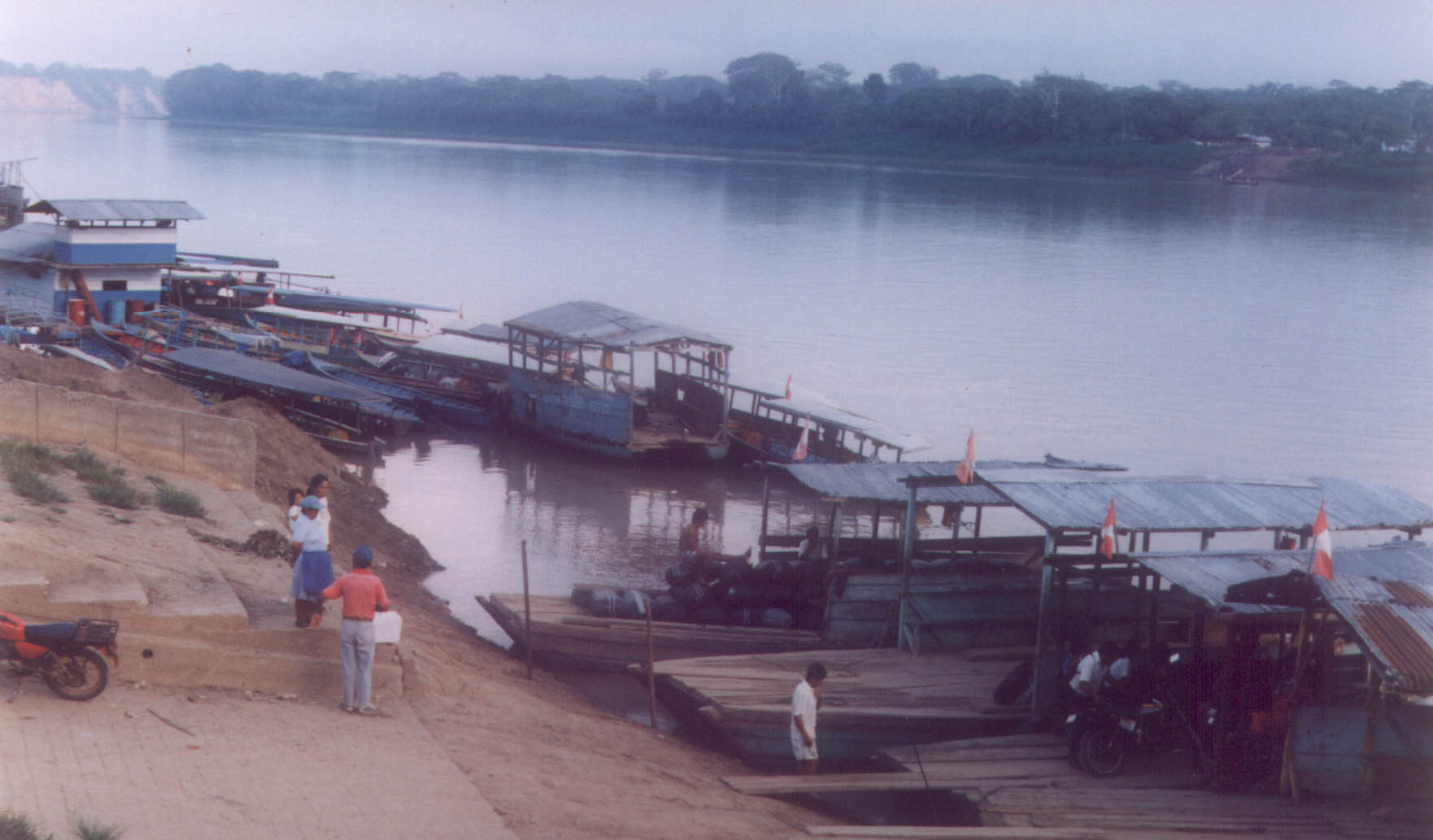
The dockside and ferry across the Madre de Dios River.

A ferry used to cross the river, linking the main road from Cusco to the towns of San Lorenzo, Iberia and Iñapari. The river ferry has been supplanted by a new bridge (the 750-metre long Continental Bridge, formerly Billinghurst, see below) but it still serves many locals. As the cost of petrol is very high in this area, the main mode of transportation among locals is by motorcycle. Puerto Maldonado is served by the Padre Aldamiz International Airport.

=== Interoceanic Highway ===
The Interoceanic Highway or Rodovia do Pacifico highway was built to link the river ports of Brazil with the Pacific coast ports of Peru. The highway was planned to pass through Puerto Maldonado, crossing the Madre de Dios River on a 722 m (2,369 ft) viaduct, the Puente Continental or Continental Bridge (formerly the Billinghurst). The bridge suffered delays in construction, which affected its budget and structural deficiencies were reported. But it was completed and opened by March 2012.

In the greater area around Puerto Maldonado, the highway cuts through primary rain forest. Some groups, including the Peruvian NGO Asociación Civil Labour, are worried that the road may encourage illegal logging, hunting and settlement in areas that had not been easily reached before. There is potential for conflict with indigenous people who had been quite isolated from the modern world.

== Sport ==
The town's football club is Club Deportivo Maldonado.
