= Isthmus of Fitzcarrald =

- Istmo de Fitzcarral (Spanish)
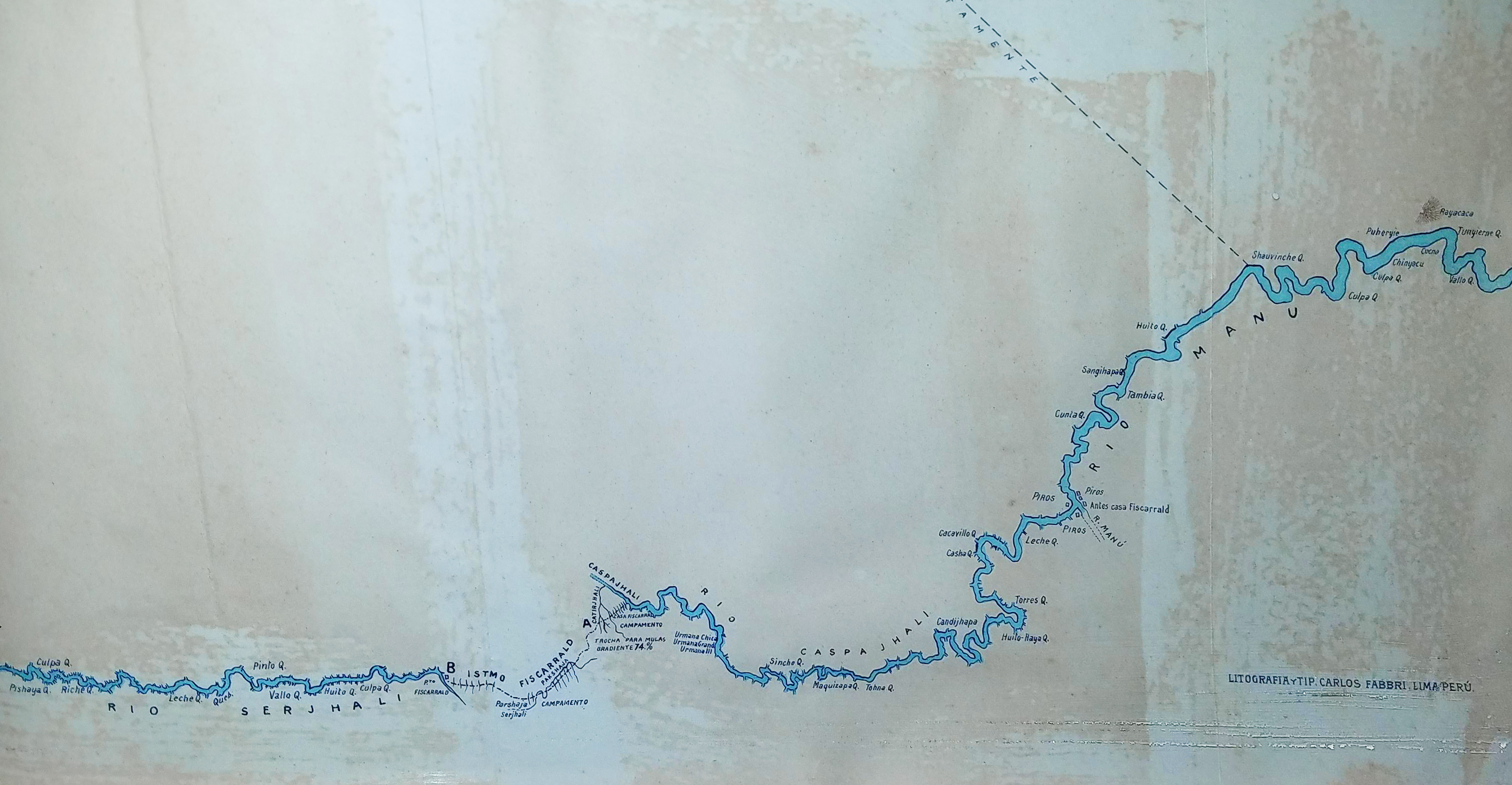

- Location within Peru
- 11°44′59.9″S 72°24′14.0″W
- Location: Fitzcarrald District, Madre de Dios, Peru

The Fitzcarrald Isthmus is an 11 km long land bridge that connected important rubber trade routes of the Urubamba River and the Madre de Dios River in Peru.

Carlos Fermin Fitzcarrald came across the land bridge in 1893 after repeated attempts to unite trade in the North and South of the Amazon basin during the Amazon rubber boom. Based on suggestions of local indigenous rubber workers who were familiar with the area, he began an initial exploration and subsequent clearing of the isthmus for trade. The isthmus is located between two small river arms, which are in turn tributaries of major river systems: the Serjhali River (a tributary of the Mishagua river, tributary of the Urubamba River, itself tributary to the Amazon river) and the Caspajhali river (a tributary of the Manu river, itself a tributary of the Madre de Dios River).

Fitzcarrald decided to disassemble his steamboat Contamana and have it be carried across the isthmus – a publicity stunt that proved the isthmus a workable cargo route for rubber transport, and served nearly a century later as the visual inspiration for Werner Herzog's film Fitzcarraldo.

The land bridge has a slow upward slope and features one 500-metre hill with a 74% gradient in its middle; mules were used to carry cargo across that inconvenient dirt road (a "trocha" in Spanish).

The Peruvian government founded the Junta de Vías Fluviales, which was given the task of surveying and mapping the isthmus in 1901. In exchange for developing routes in the region, the government offered large land concessions, incentivizing colonization. Two prominent concessions included one by Adolfo de Clairmont, and the Inca Mining Company. In exchange for building a 127-kilometre road, the Inca company was granted a two-million-acre concession. Clairmont's road would extend 58 kilometres and required the construction of 103 bridges. Clairmont, the Inca mining Co. and other entrepreneurs were allowed to join the rubber boom through the deal with the government. Once completed, the Isthmus of Fitzcarrald and the routes which came after it, connected the Madre de Dios basin to the west coast of Peru. Rubber collectors in the region could send their product onward to Puerto Maldonado, situated between the Tambopata and Madre de Dios rivers. From Puerto Maldonado, the rubber would be shipped to the isthmus, where it would be further transported to ports on the Pacific coast. Before the development of these land routes, rubber had to be shipped out through the Atlantic.

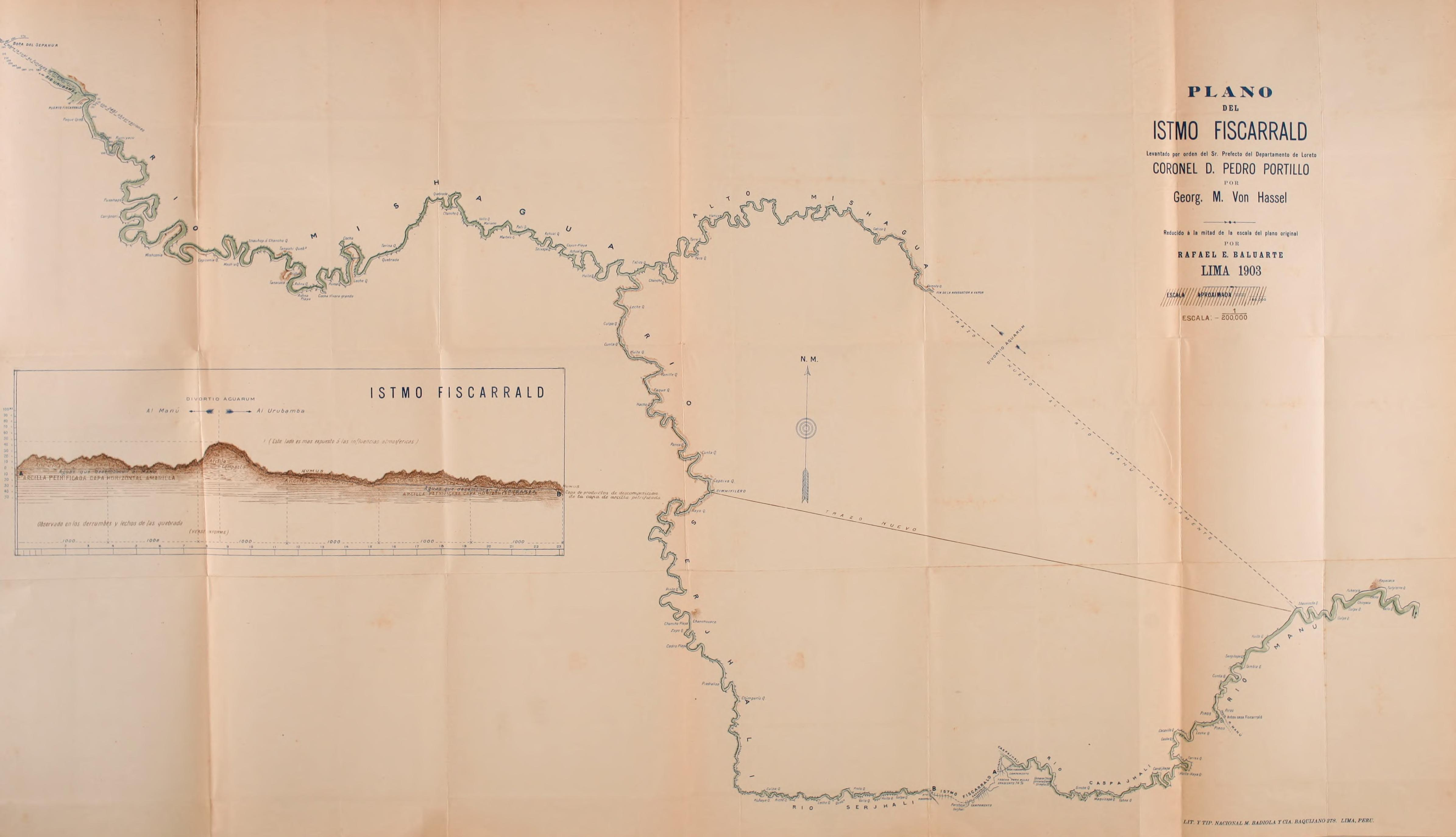
Map depicting the Isthmus of Fitzcarrald, circa 1904.

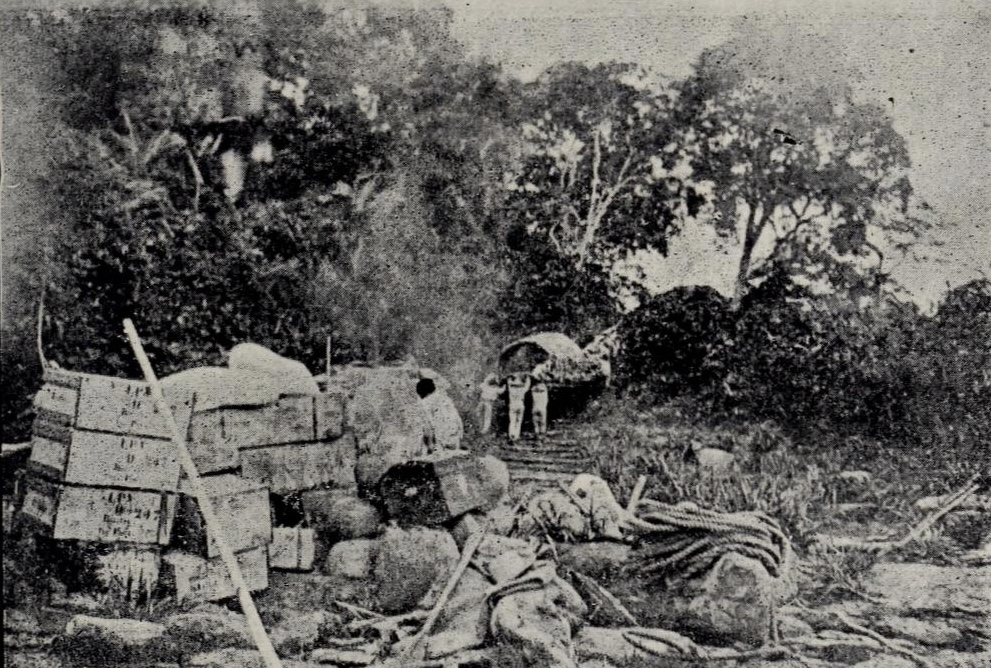
Transporting a steam launch across the Isthmus of Fitzcarrald

While others used and further mapped out the isthmus, Fitzcarrald died four years after he had discovered it; the rubber boom ended less than a decade later after the biopiracy of Henry Wickham, who smuggled tens of thousands of rubber seeds out of Brazil. This eventually led to the complete collapse of the South American rubber economy when plantations in Southeast Asia became established. With rubber no longer needing to be shipped, the isthmus route grew over again and is invisible on satellite images as of 2019 – only the two rivers remain visually.

== See also ==
- Carlos Fitzcarrald
- Carlos Fermín Fitzcarrald Province
- Iquitos
- Natural rubber
- Puerto Maldonado
