= Nicolás Suárez Callaú =

Bolivian businessman (1851–1940)

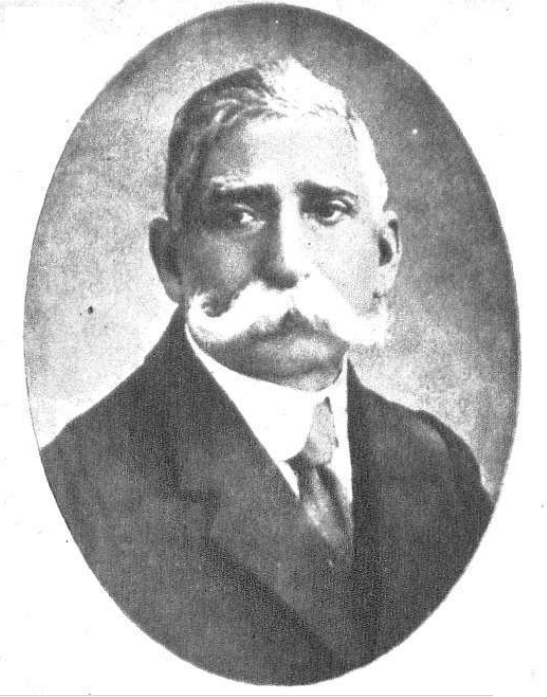
- Suárez in 1939
- Born: Nicolás Suárez Callaú; 10 September 1851; Portachuelo, Bolivia
- Died: 7 January 1940 (aged 88); Cachuela Esperanza, Bolivia
- Occupation: Rubber baron
- Spouse: Judit Arias (m. 1909)
- Family: Roberto Suárez Gómez (great grandson)

Nicolás Suárez Callaú (1851 in Portachuelo – 1940 in Cachuela Esperanza) set up a multinational rubber empire in South America at the beginning of the 20th century.

Attracted by the rubber boom, Nicolas Suárez with three of his brothers crossed the Andes at the end of the 19th century and founded Cachuela Esperanza at the rapids of Río Beni as a headquarters for the rubber export. In 1905, The India Rubber World reporter C.J. Post dubbed Nicolás as 'the Rockefeller of the Rubber Trade'.

During the heyday of the rubber boom, his empire had branches at Acre, Manaus, Belém, and London, and Nicolás Suárez Callaú owned 80,000 square kilometres of land in the Bolivian Beni and Pando departments, 50,000 heads of cattle and six steamboats.

== Early life ==
Nicolás had entered the region of northern Bolivia in 1872, at the age of 21 in attempt to catch the end of the cinchona boom. Shortly after, he gained a reputation for being a risky explorer: willing to venture alone into wild, unexplored areas in search of cinchona, and later hevea brasiliensis. In 1880 during the beginnings of the rubber boom in Bolivia, Edwin R. Heath confirmed that the river Beni flowed into the Madeira river. At the time, it was believed that they were completely separate and the explored area was inhabited by 'abnormally hostile' natives. Nicolás Suárez, who had been dealing with rubber in Reyes was one of the most interested benefactors of this news.

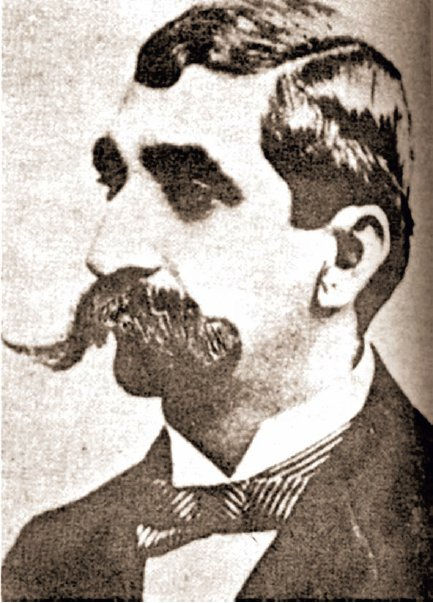
Nicolas Suarez Callau in 1886.

After absorbing news of this discovery, Suárez went down stream of the Beni to settle a new trading site close to the Brazil-Mamoré river border. Near one of the rivers rocky rapids his ship capsized and Nicolás was lucky to survive. The location demanded a short portage around a water fall: and anyone who wanted to pass the cachuela would have to face this delay. Just before his thirtieth birthday in 1881, Nicolás started to establish himself in this location, having the site cleared of vegetation before erecting a warehouse and crude dwellings. Thus establishing the settlement of Cachuela Esperanza. Shortly after, two of his brothers joined him there to establish the Suárez Hermanos firm. In 1890, after one of the Suárez hermanos became the Bolivian Consul-General in London, and the Suárez Hermanos & Co. was formed with headquarters in London. He later sent the two brothers to set up commercial branches at Manaus, Pará and at San Antonio below the Madeira falls. Heath's discovery had led to a wave of migration into the lower Beni: with other people following Suárez to prospect for rubber. Key competitors like Antonio de Vaca Díez, Antenor Vásquez and Maison Braillard also expanded their businesses into the region.

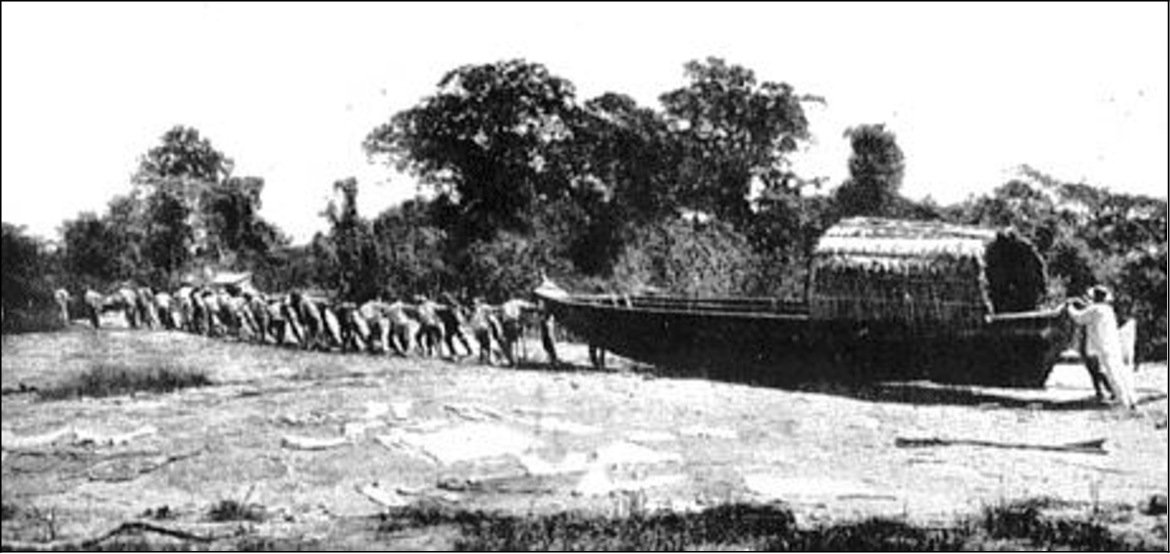
Portaging a Batelote around the Cachuelas

Nicolás constantly ranged along the 'rubber rivers,' becoming personally familiar with the routes his boats would have to take. An effort was made to secure as many of the waterfalls / cachuelas as possible: taxing and controlling the traffic along the portage points. The Madeira and Mamoré rivers had eighteen individual cachuelas interrupting travel. He advised the building of warehouses, supply posts, cart tracks between stations, as well as securing and disciplining labor. Apart from establishing large rubber collection centers as well as their attendant stations, Nicolás continued to establish his role as a general trader: emphasizing the distribution of supplies and supply posts. In an attempt to confirm the Bolivian claim to the land settled by rubber tappers: Vaca Díez, Vásquez, Suárez along with other prominent families, began to organize convoys of immigrants from the south. There were insufficient numbers of migrants, as the northern regions of Bolivia had a labor shortage, and shortage of people willing to make such a demanding journey. In response, valleys in the Yungas, Pando, Beni, and department of Santa Cruz were 'scoured' for natives to work as a source of labor. A few of the vulnerable tribes exploited by these rubber tappers include, but are not limited to: various Araona groups, Toromona, and Tacana The Suarez family also exploited various Harakmbut, Mascho-Piro, and Cashinahua groups.

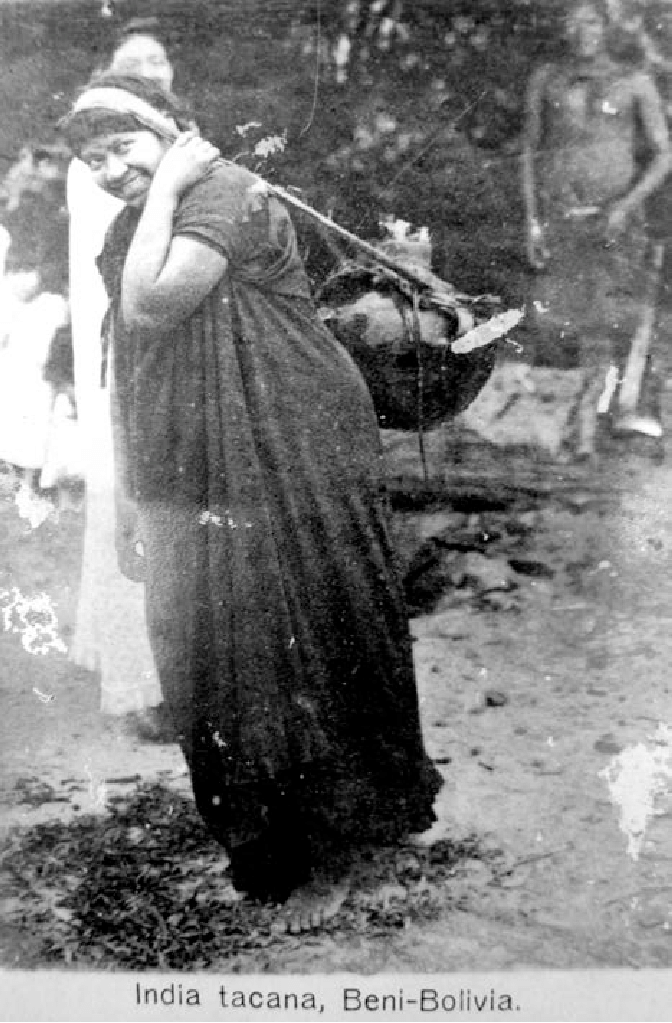
Indigenous Tacana woman carrying a weight load on her back. Beni, Bolivia

Around 1893, the explorer and rubber baron Carlos Fermín Fitzcarrald discovered the Fitzcarrald Isthmus. The isthmus was a series of portage crossings that connected the Urubamba river concentrated in Peru, and the Madre de Dios basin of Bolivia. On September 4, 1894, Carlos docked at a Suarez port: surprising Nicolas and his employees. They arrived on the steamboat the ‘Contamana’ with the Peruvian flag hoisted. The two later negotiated a business partnership and future plans.

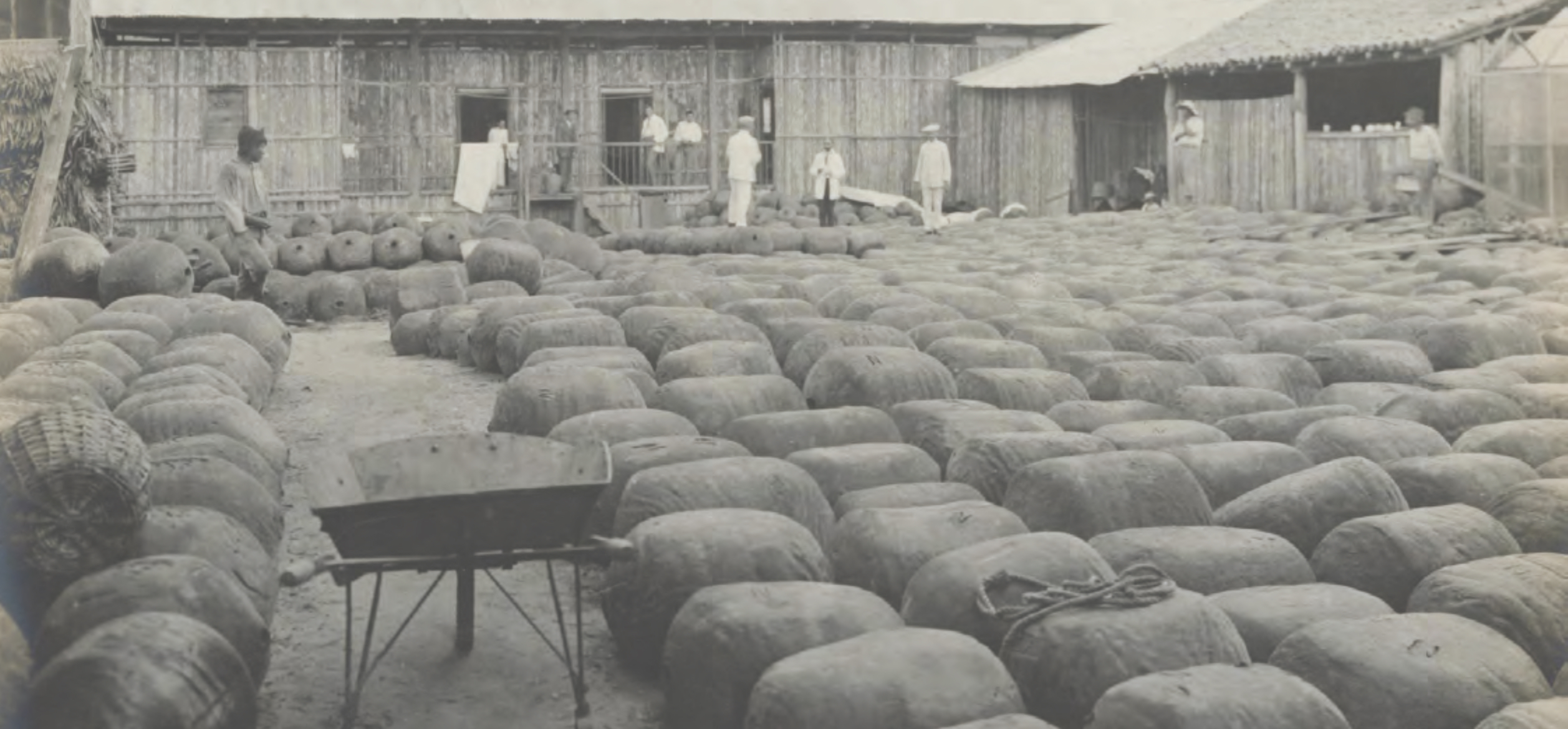
Courtyard of the Settlement of Mssrs. Suarez y Hermanos, Filled With Rubber Biscuits Ready for Shipment

== The Suárez brothers ==
Nicolás had five brothers, and two sisters. His two youngest brothers died in childhood, leaving Nicolás as the youngest son of the family. Rómulo, Gregorio, and Francisco were instrumental in founding the Suárez rubber empire. Each of these brothers had their own branches named after them, however trading never took place under the name Nicolás Suárez.

Francisco Suárez, the eldest of the brothers had left Bolivia before the start of the rubber boom. He journeyed to England in 1871 and became the Bolivian Consul-General in London that same year. He soon opened up a trading house in London, and Suárez rubber was exclusively sent to the English market for a while. In June 1890, Francisco opened up his own company F. Suárez Hermanos & Co. Shortly after, the family decided that Francisco should also set up the European headquarters of the newly launched Suárez Hermanos & Co: gaining an early lead in the London rubber market. He later helped Vaca Díez established the Orton Rubber Company, which Francisco became a director in. Due to his position as Bolivian consul-general, he was also trusted with the power of attorney for Vaca Díez. Francisco died in 1897, near the beginning of February at the age of sixty-four and he left behind £74,000 in assets.

Rómulo Suárez was sent to establish multiple branches in Brazil around the start of the 1890s. He established agencies in Pará, Manaus, and Santo Antônio which was below the Madeira falls. These branches formed part of their own company named R. Suárez & Co. Shortly after founding this company Rómulo moved south to manage the ranching enterprise for the family. He bought multiple ranches in the surrounding land around a Suarez headquarters port at La Loma. Rómulo managed the ranches from La Loma, where jerked beef was sent by wagon to then be distributed to the Suárez plantations by boat. Erland Nordenskiöld referred to Rómulo as "The Great Exterminator" and in a book titled Indios y Blancos, he described how Rómulo was terrorizing the indigenous population and had flogged some of the natives to death. Rómulo was murdered in 1908 by one of his servants at La Loma (Loma Suárez) near the city of Trinidad.

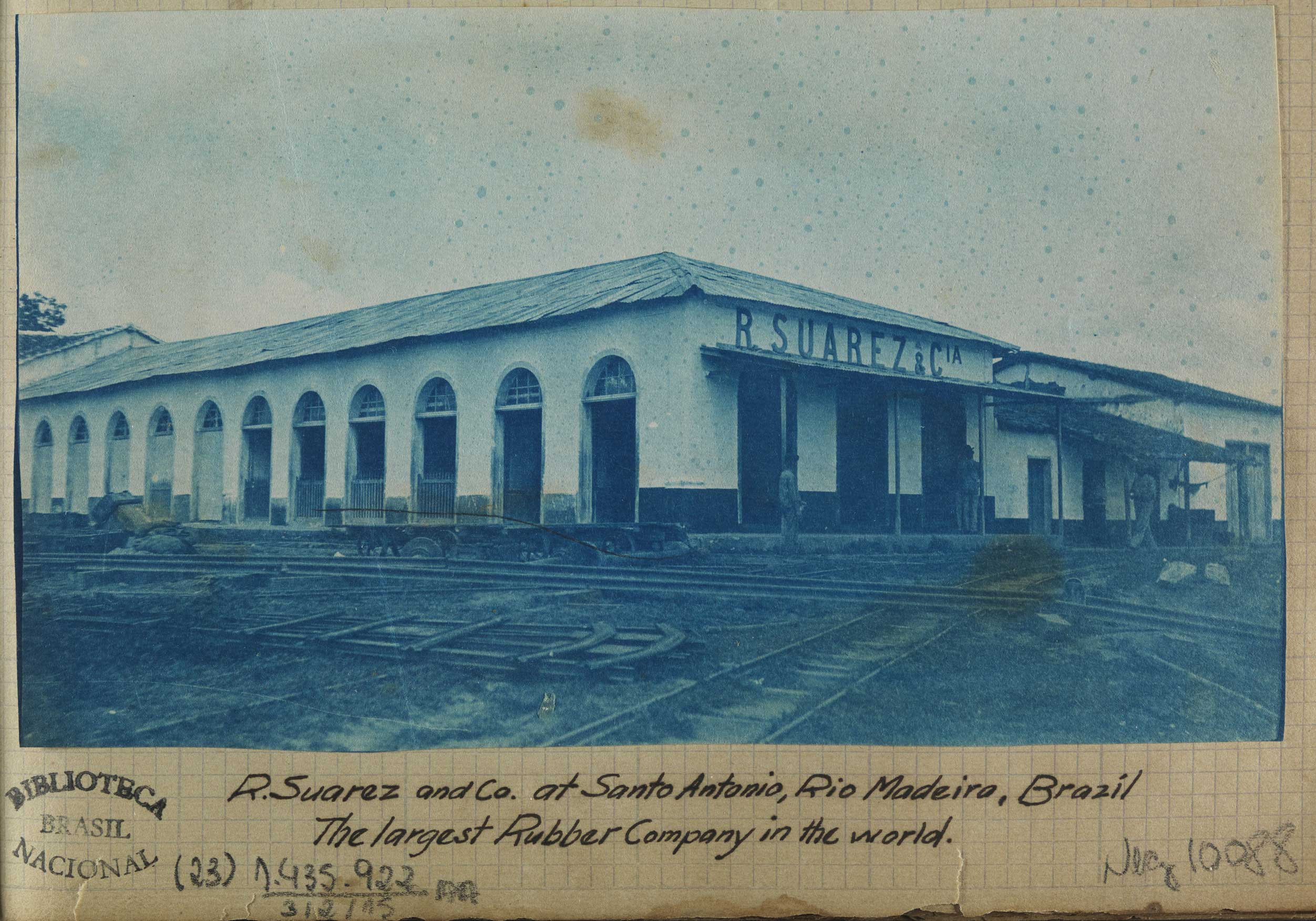
R. Suarez and Co. at Santo Antonio, Rio Madeira, Brazil. The largest Rubber Company in the world

Gregorio, third of the Suarez sons was stationed at the Madeira-Mamoré falls to administer the movement of rubber downstream and supplies going upstream. He supervised and personally traversed the route for many years before his death sometime around 1908. While moving upstream with three boats loaded with supplies for Cachuela Esperanza, Gregorio was hailed by a group of Caripunás. He recognized a couple of the natives on the river bank and went ashore to meet them. The natives challenged Gregorio to a test of marksmanship. After Gregorio's turn was done, the native up to the test turned from the target and shot him in the heart. The rest of Gregorio's group was in turn killed with the exception of two survivors. Nicolas Suarez immediately took off down river when he heard the news and started a mission to track the natives. Eventually they were found, surrounded by cases of supplies and Gregorio's severed head attached to a spear. Nicolas and his men surrounded the natives and "annihilated every man" within the camp.

== Rubber baron ==
In 1897 Carlos Fitzcarrald drowned along with Antonio de Vaca Diez in the Urubamba river when their boat sank. Nicolas Suárez and Julio César Arana, an infamous rubber baron in Peru, were the two biggest benefactors of the 1897 accident. Suárez acquired a substantial portion of Fitzcarrald's fleet, along with a portion of his work force. While Arana lost his biggest competitor in Peru. Nicolas was also able to absorb Vaca Diez's rubber collecting business, which dominated the Orthon river. This same year Nicolás's romantic partner, Constanza Roca, perished at the age of twenty-one, and Nicolás had a marble statue imported from Italy to Cachuela Esperanza to commemorate her. In 1901, Suárez owned the Sucre and Santa Cruz which operated on the Mamoré River, while his fleet on the Beni River consisted of the Campa, Roca, Esperanza and Sena steamships. The liquidation of Vaca Diez's enterprise was finalized in 1901 after Suárez was granted power of attorney of the firm, and he acquired the Inambary steamship on the Mamoré River, as well as the steamships Sernambí and Ortón on the Beni River.

Anthropologist Klaus Rummenhoeller describes that during this time period natives were persecuted in the region due to the correrias, or slave raids carried out by Suárez's employees. These raids led to the destruction of their homes, the capture of men, women and the killing of children as well as the elderly.

In response to the Acre revolution breaking out in 1899, Nicolas Suarez founded the Porvenir column, a "vigilante band" of hired guns. This unit was stationed near a strategic point along the Tahuamanu River during a portion of the conflict. The column was most notable for retaking Cobija in 1902. Brazil and Bolivia signed the Treaty of Petrópolis after the end of the conflict. Due to Nicolás's contribution toward the war effort, the Bolivian government granted him a concession that was composed of almost 8,000 square miles of land near the Beni region. In exchange for Brazil receiving the Acre territory from Bolivia, Brazil would pay for the construction of the Madeira-Mamoré Railroad. Between 1907 and 1912 the project claimed thousands of lives from the demanding situation in the jungle, which earned it the nickname of the 'Devils railroad'.

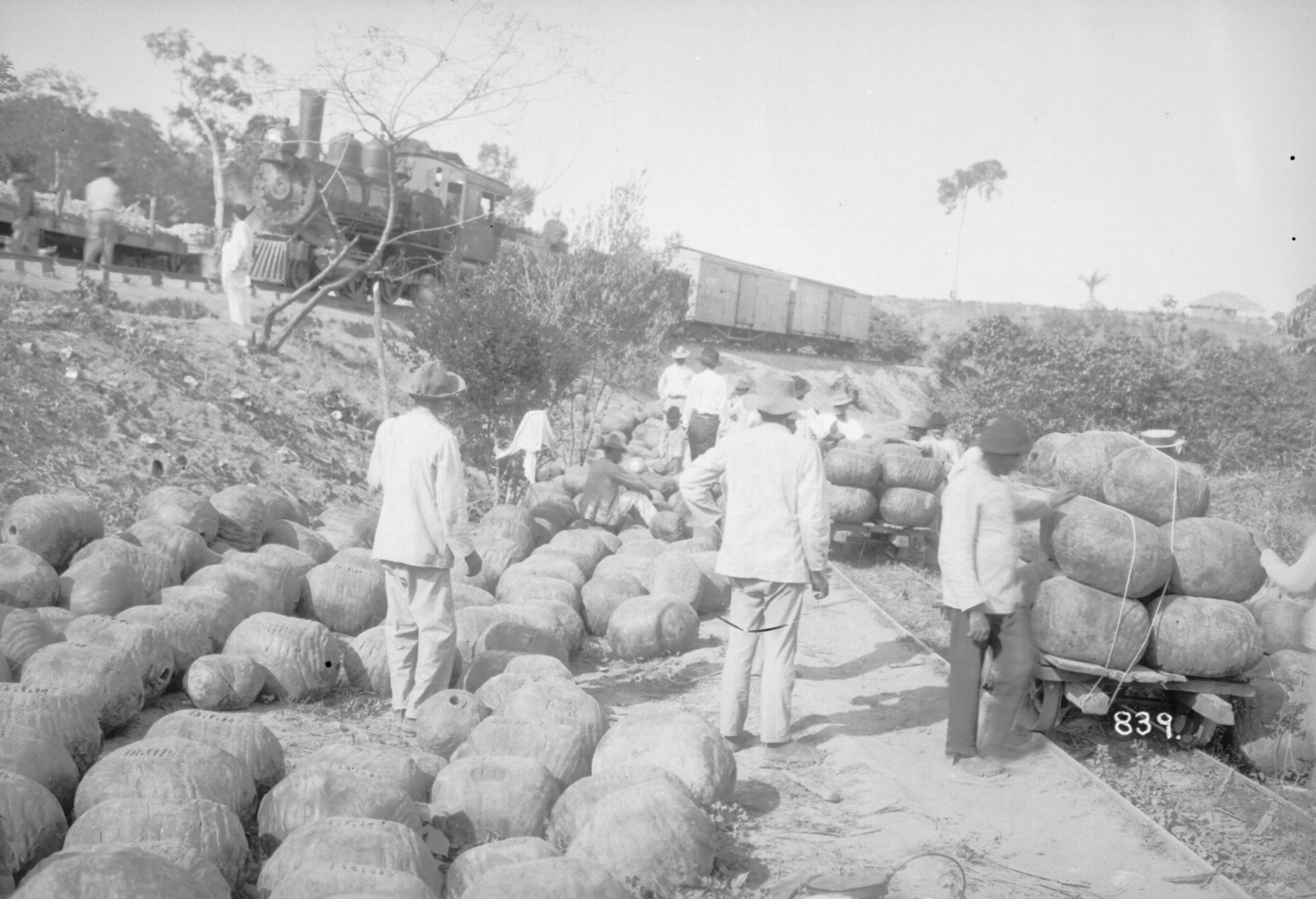
Bundles of rubber awaiting transportation along the Madeira-Mamore railway, 1910–1913.

Nicolás reorganized the three separate Suárez companies in 1909, registering them in London as Suárez Hermanos & Co. Ltd: starting with a nominal capital of £750,000. Three steamships, with two smaller launches along with other boats were listed on the Amazon River, six steamships on the Beni River, three steamers on the Mamoré River and 20,629 estradas along with other assets were listed included in this company's prospectus. Nicolás retained £363,900 worth of shares for himself. While in London, he added on to properties he owned in West Hampstead, purchasing three more houses for the family. Many of Nicolás's children spent time in London, especially his eldest daughter Esperanza, who lived there most of her life. The nephew of Nicolás, Pedro Suárez, succeeded his uncle Francisco as the Bolivian Consul-General in the city. In this position, Pedro countered any rumors of the family, and declared the Suárez estates to be open: inviting any representatives to investigate the region if they'd like. This was in response to allegations of 'another Putumayo in Bolivia.' When a British minister visited in 1913, he was not permitted to venture very far into the estate, instead being limited to the companies principal properties.

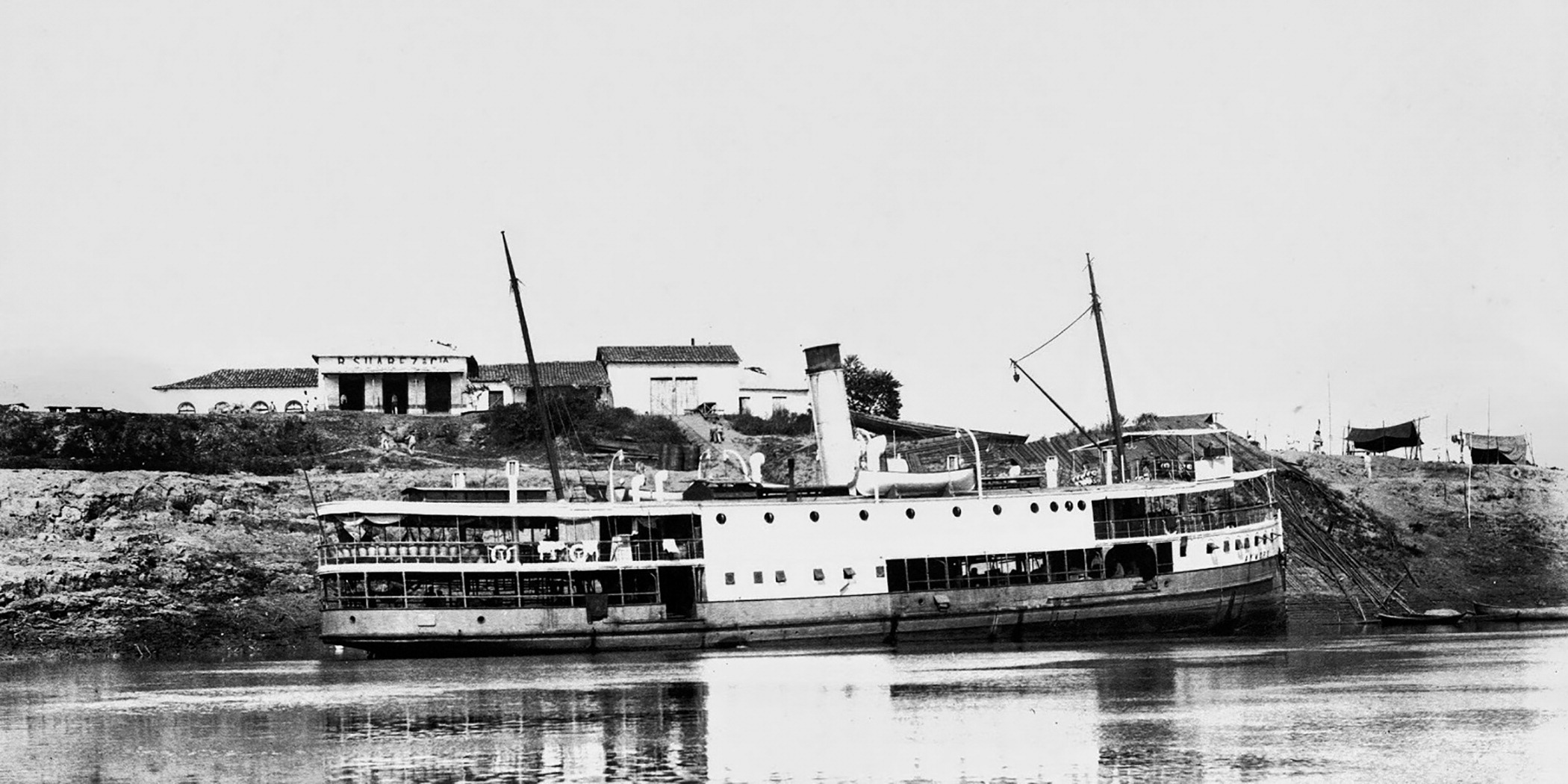
“Casa Suarez in San Antonio, 1908-1911.” The caption gives the ship name ‘Sucre.’ An office of R. Suarez & Co. Ltd. can be seen at the top of the hill.

British minister Cecil Gosling and explorer Percy Fawcett both visited the rubber territory owned by Suarez. They both agreed that the rubber stations operated on a peonage system. Gosling stayed in the Suárez rubber estates for 5 months on a tour in 1913, and labelled the peonage system as "undisguised slavery.". Both the natives exploited by Suárez and official employees were subject to the system where credit was forwarded. The company charged everything on credit, indebting many and virtually trapping them in the region. The contract provided to employees stipulated that they would liquidate their personal assets to pay back a debt to the company if need be. As well as promising to a pay a certain amount of bolivianos to compensate the company if they attempted to run away. Bolivian historian Pilar Gamarra Tellez estimated that between 1895 and 1912 the Suárez companies obtained around 10,750 estradas through debts and or missed payments. An estrada typically consisted of 150 rubber trees spread throughout the forest. Work relations did not change much after the price of rubber collapsed in 1913. The cheap work force tied to the rubber industry by debts continued to be the most important financial asset for Suárez. The price collapse made it harder for the debtors to repay the company, further worsening the financial situation of the workers. Instead of production levels decreasing due to the fluctuation of the price, Bolivia and the Suárez estates exported more rubber after 1913.

The railway saw about one year of operation before the price of rubber collapsed, and rendered the project uneconomical. The three trains a week in July 1912 turned into 1 train delivery a week by November 1913. Around this time the price of rubber dropped to around .73 cents a pound or less in Bolivia. Most of the rubber transported on the railway was produced in the Suárez estate, where it would be shipped to Riberalta and then delivered to Porto Velho.

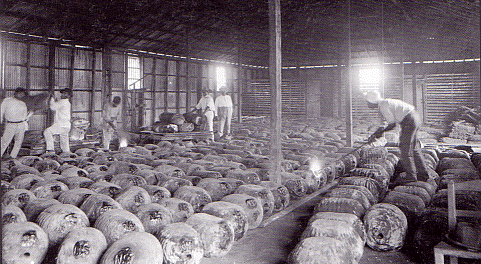
Rubber bales, ready for removal, Cachuela Esperanza, 1914

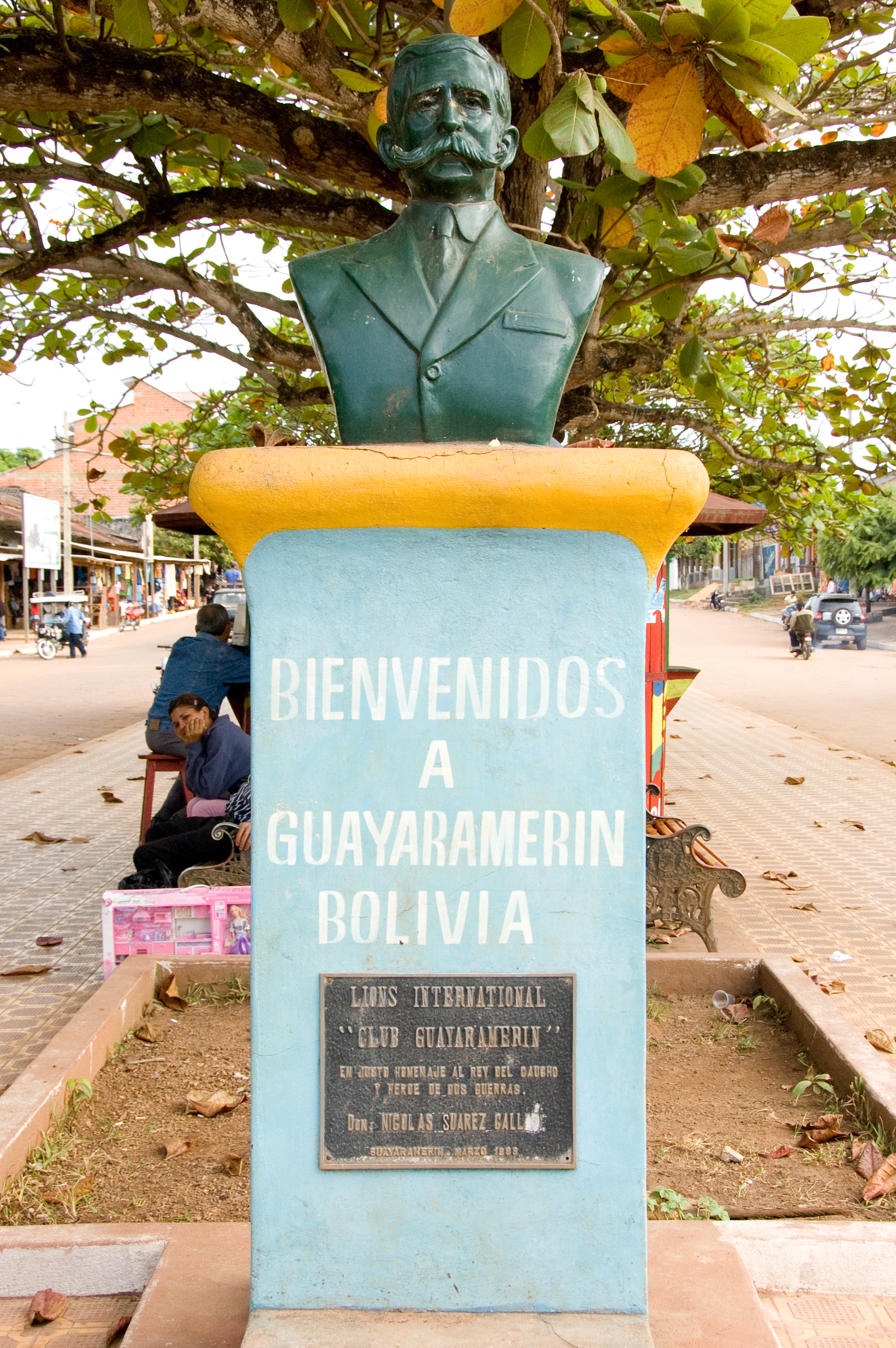
Statue of Nicolás Suárez Callaú in Guayaramerín, Bolivia

== See also ==
- Carlos Fitzcarrald
- Amazon rubber cycle

== Bibliography ==
- Hessel, Lizzie; Rose, Anne; Brown, Ann (1987). Lizzie : a Victorian lady's Amazon adventure. British Broadcasting Corporation.
- Fifer, Valerie (1970). "The Empire Builders: A History of the Bolivian Rubber Boom and the Rise of the House of Suarez". Journal of Latin American Studies. 2 (2). JSTOR 156583.
- Roux, Jean-Claude (1994). L'Amazonie Peruvie Ne Un Eldorado dévoré par la forêt 1821-1910 (PDF). Editions L'Harmattan.
- Vallve, Frederic (2010). "The Economics of Rubber and the Habilito System". The impact of the rubber boom on the Bolivian Lowlands (1850-1920) (dissertation). Georgetown University.
