= Cachuela Esperanza =

- Location in Bolivia
- Coordinates: 10°32′S 65°35′W
- Country: Bolivia
- Department: Beni Department
- Province: Vaca Díez Province
- Municipality: Guayaramerín Municipality
- Elevation: 440 ft (134 m)

Population (2001)
  - Total: 1,364
- Time zone: UTC-4 (BOT)

Cachuela Esperanza is a village in the Bolivian Departamento Beni.

== Location ==
Cachuela Esperanza ("rapids of hope") is situated on the right bank at the rapids of Beni River, 30 km before its confluence with Mamoré River which both form the Madeira River there. The village is only accessible on dirt roads and is located at an elevation of 134 m.

== History ==
The place at the Beni rapids was discovered in 1846 by the Bolivian scientist José Agustín Palacios. Attracted by the rubber boom, Nicolas Suárez Callaú set up his company's headquarters of a multinational rubber empire at Cachuela Esperanza, with branches at Acre, Manaus, Belém, and London.

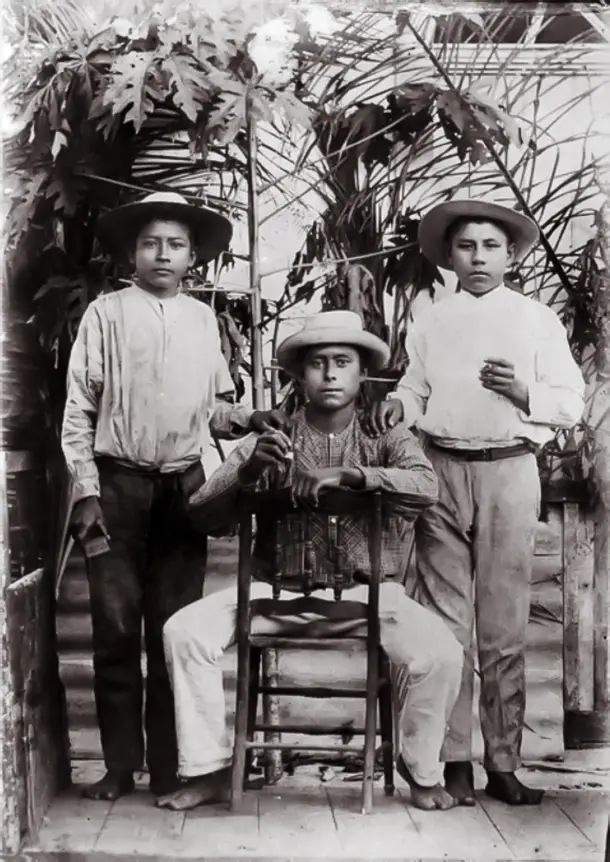
“Indios of Cachuela Esperanza.” Photograph circa 1908-1911.

He had a theater and tennis courts built, a luxury hotel overlooking the rapids, and a modern hospital. Cachuela Esperanza had the first X-ray unit of Bolivia, and millionaires from Rio de Janeiro und São Paulo were flown in by seaplanes. In the 1920s, when natural rubber was substituted by synthetic rubber gradually, the importance of Cachuela Esperanza declined, and with the Bolivian Revolution of 1952 the artificial jungle town sank into insignificance once and for all.

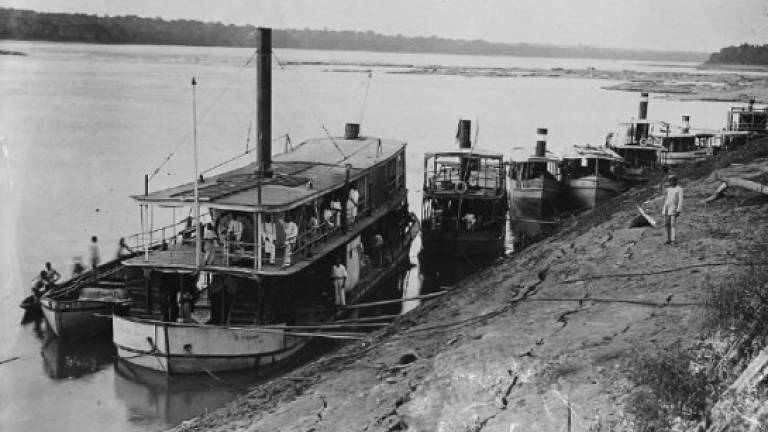
Steamships at Cachuela Esperanza

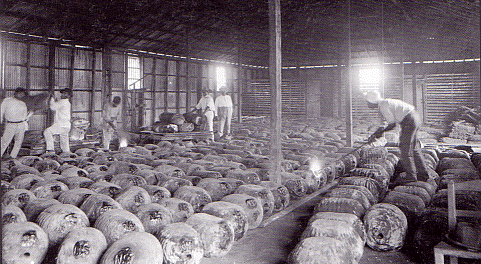
Rubber bales, ready for removal, Cachuela Esperanza, 1914

== Population ==
Today, Cachuela Esperanza has a mere 200 inhabitants. In the past, the most significant personality of the town was Nicolas Suárez Callaú, the "rubber king", along with the tin barons Patiño, Hochschild and Aramayo one of the most influential tycoons of Bolivia. Moreover, in 1925 Cachulea Esperanza was the birthplace of Eugen Gomringer, son of a Swiss and a Bolivian girl, who is seen as the father of "Concrete Poetry".
