= Peter Gow (anthropologist) =

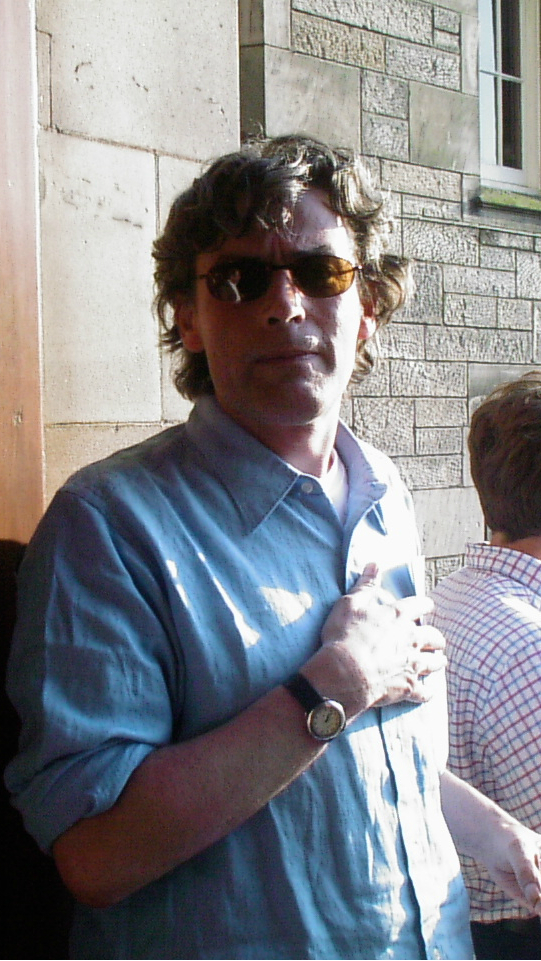
- Born: 19 June, 1958; Edinburgh, Scotland
- Died: 18 May, 2021
- Education: PhD, Social Anthropology from Manchester University,
- Occupation: Anthropologist
- Employer(s): Lecturer at London School of Economics and the University of St Andrews
- Known for: Social Anthropology

Peter G Gow (1958 – 18 May 2021) was a social anthropologist, renowned for his work in Amazonia. He was a Professor of Social Anthropology at the University of St Andrews and previously taught at the London School of Economics.

== Life ==
Pete Gow was born in Scotland to James and Helen Gow in 1958. He died on 18 May 2021.

== Works ==
- An Amazonian Myth and its History (2001)ISBN 0199241961, 9780199241965
- Of Mixed Blood - Kinship and History in Peruvian Amazonia (1991)ISBN 019827355X, 9780198273554

== Universities ==
- Manchester University
- London School of Economics
- University of St Andrews
