= Tambopata =

Tambopata can refer to any of the following entities:

- Tambopata Province in the department of Madre de Dios in south-eastern Peru
  - Tambopata District in the Tambopata Province
- Tambopata River, a tributary to the Madre de Dios River
- Tambopata-Candamo reserve, adjacent to the Tambopata River
