= 1967 Rio Doce State Park wildfire =

Forest fire in Brazil

- Date: September 1967 – October 1967
- Location: Rio Doce State Park, Minas Gerais, Brazil
- Coordinates: 19°39′00″S 42°32′02″W

Statistics
- Total area: 9,000 ha (22,000 acres)

Impacts
- Deaths: 12
- Injuries: 1

Ignition
- Cause: Unknown

The 1967 Rio Doce State Park wildfire was a major forest fire that occurred in the Rio Doce Valley, located in the state of Minas Gerais, Brazil, in the 1960s. The Rio Doce State Park (Parque Estadual do Rio Doce – PERD), considered to be the largest Atlantic Forest reserve in the state, has 35,976 hectares (88,900 acres) according to 2019 data – information prior to the fire stated that there were 30,000 ha (74,000 acres) – distributed between the municipalities of Dionísio, Marliéria and Timóteo. It was created in 1944.

In mid-September 1967, during a prolonged drought, a fire of unknown causes was started in the park that lasted over a month and consumed 9,000 hectares of the reserve, managed by the State Forestry Institute (Instituto Estadual de Florestas – IEF). Twelve people died in fighting the flames, after fighters led by Sergeant Agenor Almeida Costa were surrounded by a line of fire on October 18, near the Dom Helvécio Lagoon. It is therefore the second largest forest fire in Brazil in number of fatalities, second only to the fire in Paraná in 1963, which left 110 dead.

The fire was brought under control on October 24 after about 30 km (19 mi) of firebreaks were opened, but fires remained active for at least another week. Plantations in the vicinity and some homes were also affected. Despite the size of the native forest destroyed, the reserve's forests have not suffered another major fire and this has allowed the vegetation and soil to regenerate naturally.

== Context ==
The Rio Doce State Park is located in the Rio Doce Valley, eastern Minas Gerais, a region that had its native Atlantic Forest severely devastated due to the extraction of wood to feed the furnaces of local industries and to give way to farming activities and eucalyptus monoculture throughout the 20th century. The ecological unit was created with the intention of safeguarding the last large remnant of native forest in this area, through the efforts of Dom Helvécio Gomes de Oliveira, archbishop of Mariana, the then governor Benedito Valadares and his secretary of agriculture Israel Pinheiro. Its foundation occurred through decree-law No. 1,119 of July 14, 1944. Due to the devastation of nearby forests, protection of the PERD was strengthened in 1962, when the IEF took over administration. Occasional fires occurred until then, but surveillance began to be intensified and deforested areas were reforested. On the other hand, there was no precedent for fire on the scale reached in 1967.

== History ==
=== Origin of the wildfire ===
Information from the time shows that the exact cause of the origin of the fire is unknown, but the first suspicions referred to the release of a cigarette tip, burned in some pasture that reached the conservation unit; purposeful motivation; or even spontaneous combustion because of the heat, in mid-September 1967. Major Vicente Rodrigues, commander of the Rural Vigilance, believed that the front fire that started in Dionísio was caused by cigarette butts left on the side of the road, while the front fire in the region of Maringá Farm, near the Doce River, on the border between Timóteo and Ipatinga, may have been "sabotage" by timber smugglers, hunters and fishermen angry with the police inspections. Less than a year ago hunting and logging had been prohibited, and fishing was restricted to the Dom Helvécio Lagoon and on weekends. During the fire one person was arrested setting fire to the forest near Maringá Farm, but no further details were released. Later the hypothesis of a cigarette was dismissed as the fire in Dionisio started in the middle of the forest. Suspicion returned to the charcoal ovens near the park, which possibly let off sparks. According to information from the Ministry of the Environment, the fire would have started with a bonfire left by a tourist.

It is known for sure that the region faced a prolonged drought and a period of high temperatures, which contributed to the spread of the flames with the help of the wind. At a rainfall station operated by the National Water Agency (Agência Nacional de Águas – ANA) in Coronel Fabriciano, the only daily precipitation accumulations above 3 mm (0.12 in) in the period from April 21 to November 17 were 21 mm (0.83 in) on May 18 and 11 mm (0.43 in) on September 14, but precipitation had been below average since January (the wet season runs from October to April). Furthermore, the Rio Doce State Park surveillance team, consisting of ten soldiers, one corporal, and Sergeant Agenor Almeida Costa, was small compared to the size of the park. If a spark started a fire in the middle of the forest it would hardly be noticed immediately, with enough time for fire proliferation.

Most of the fire started from the two fronts mentioned above. The first, which originated near Dionisio, came under control around October 9, but when it was almost extinct the second front started near Maringá Farm on October 12. Shortly afterwards, a new front gained intensity again near where the first appeared. At this point the situation became much worse, with the appearance of other fire lines, the increase in heat and the intensification of winds, providing flames that reached 40 m (130 ft) in height. Another large front came to appear in the region of the Limoeiro Stream, in Timóteo. At times the flames advanced to 20 km/h (12 mph).

=== Aggravation and deaths ===
The lack of trained personnel and the absence of equipment contributed to the increase of the fire. Most of the firebreaks were being opened with hand axes and tree branches. About 300 people were engaged in fighting the flames, the vast majority workers from the companies in the region (Usiminas, Acesita and Belgo-Mineira). The companies also feared that the flames would reach eucalyptus plantations and charcoal installations that supply the furnaces of their industrial complexes. However, there were still military personnel from the Fire Department, Military Police and Rural Vigilance.

On October 18, Sergeant Agenor, who had spent three days in the forest making firebreaks in the Dionisio region, was trying to return home after a brief reduction in fire activity. After traveling 2 km (1.2 mi) in his jeep, accompanied by soldier Cirilo, he spotted an intensification of flames and decided to return to fight them. Agenor formed a team of 12 combatants, who started to produce a firebreak around 1:30 pm; meanwhile, Cirilo left the area to summon other men. According to reports from José Lino, a worker for the Forestry and Agricultural Company (Companha Agrícola e Florestal – CAF) and the only survivor of the group, the fire began to advance at a rapid rate shortly afterwards, without enough time for everyone to evacuate the site properly.

The smoke also made the men disoriented as they fled. As a result, 11 men burned to death on the spot (including Sergeant Agenor), one died from his wounds in the early morning of the 20th, and José Lino, although wounded, survived because he was able to reach a boat in the Dom Helvécio Lagoon. Among the fatal victims, besides the sergeant, were employees of CAF, a subsidiary of Belgo-Mineira, and a forest ranger.

Over the course of October 19, the fire grew steadily, and by the morning of October 20, the two fronts were 30 km (19 mi) long; the lines reached 40 km (25 mi), 20 km (12 mi) each. Also on October 20, a team of 87 firefighters from Belo Horizonte arrived in the region to help fight the blaze. However, due to the lack of equipment, the soldiers were unable to work in the area and returned to the capital of Minas Gerais shortly afterwards. For the firefighters involved, the only hope at this point was that it would rain heavily and there was a fear that the entire reserve would be consumed. Lieutenants Campos and José Luis suggested to Major Vicente that tractors be used, since entering the forest was becoming impossible. On October 21 the governor of Minas Gerais Israel Pinheiro flew over the region, but could not see anything because of the smoke.

Take a good look. Now that we need rain, we don't know if it will come. And the lack of rain is caused precisely by the lack of forests; and a forest is being burned down without anyone being able to do anything about it.

— Major Vicente Rodrigues, commander of the Rural Vigilance, to Jornal do Brasil, October 21, 1967.

=== Attenuation ===
Information from October 22 shows that the flames were 15 km (9.3 mi) long, with men working 18 hours a day. The flames began to be controlled on October 24, after opening about 30 km (19 mi) of fire breaks in the Dom Helvécio Lagoon, Maringá Farm and Limoeiro Stream regions by three teams, with 30 workers from the CAF each, and the use of four tractors provided by Captain Manuel Pinheiro of the Rural Patrol. The firebreaks formed a kind of circle that restricted the fire lines to 15,000 ha (37,000 acres) of the Rio Doce State Park, equivalent to about half of the reserve. This process also protected much of the eucalyptus plantations, about 20,000 ha (49,000 acres), but there was a risk of the fire reaching populated areas in Dionísio and Timóteo if the wind blew strong and constant for 48 hours straight. Despite the mitigation of the fire, flames were still active in the last days of the month, but reports in November were that the fire had already ceased.

== Impacts ==
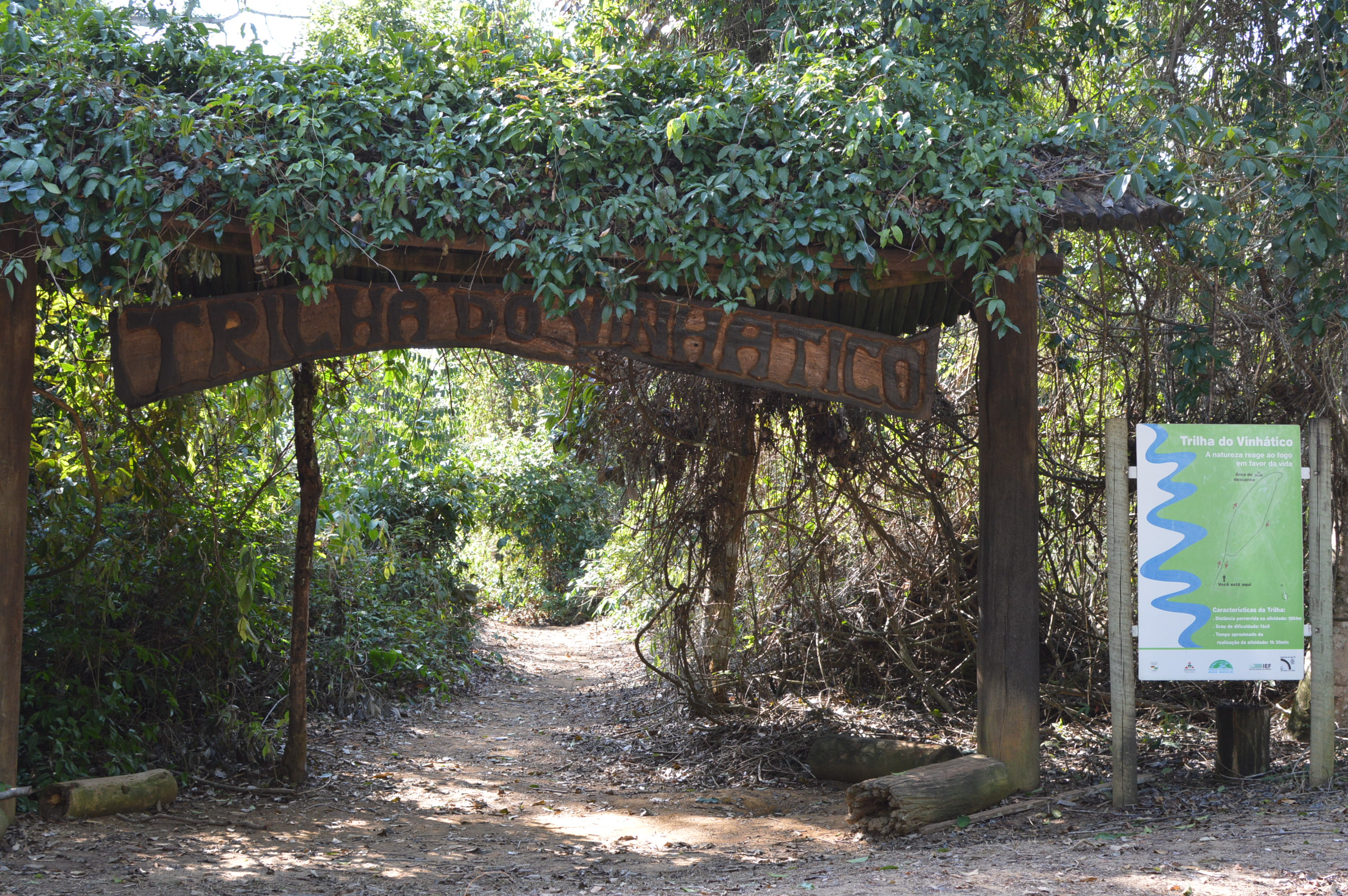
Vinhático Trail, which intercedes an area affected by the 1967 fire.

In addition to the 12 human losses, the fire devastated approximately 9,000 ha (22,000 acres) of the Rio Doce State Park, equivalent to one-third of the reserve. Mostly specimens of peroba, jacaranda, and ipês were consumed, as well as century-old Atlantic Forest native trees, with some reaching 30 meters in height. About 30 ha (74 acres) of CAF's eucalyptus plantations were also burned. Material damage was 1,500,000,000 Brazilian cruzeiros, which includes lost timber, neighboring plantations and houses in rural villages. In 1969 a process of renovation and restructuring of the park was initiated by the state government to be opened to tourism, which had been planned since before the fire.

The park's forests did not suffer another major fire and this allowed natural regeneration of the vegetation and soil. Thus, the PERD has continued to be the largest Atlantic Forest reserve in the state and has significant relevance regarding conservation of regional natural resources. Some trails open to tourists pass through areas affected by the 1967 event, such as Angico Vermelho and Vinhático, and traces of the disaster are only noticed when shown by the guides. Although fire monitoring has been intensified over the years, the reserve is still not fully safeguarded from new occurrences. In September 1993, a fire occurred that affected about 100 ha (250 acres) of native forest in Timóteo. Between September 20 and 24, 2019, a fire consumed 484.2 ha (1,196 acres) of the Rio Doce State Park between Marliéria and Timóteo.

During the 1967 fire, three inquiries were opened: a military police to investigate the death of Sergeant Agenor, a military one to investigate the deaths of the other combatants, and another to investigate the causes of the fire. Commander Agenor Almeida Costa, who died while fighting the flames, was honored with the name given to the 3rd Environmental Platoon of the Rio Doce State Park in Marliéria, which was renamed the Sergeant Agenor de Almeida Costa Barracks on September 21, 2011. On the occasion his wife Romilda Andrade Costa and family members of other combatants were also honored under the presence of the Music Band of the 14th Military Police Battalion.

== See also ==
- Rio Doce State Park
- 2020 Brazil rainforest wildfires
- 2019 Amazon rainforest wildfires
- Deforestation in Brazil

== Bibliography ==
- Barbosa, Kenia de Souza (2010). Por que a gestão da região metropolitana do Vale do Aço não sai do papel? (Thesis) (in Portuguese). UFMG.
- Lopes, Waldomiro de Paula; Silva, Alexandre Francisco da; Souza, Agostinho Lopes de; Meira Neto, João Augusto Alves (2002). Estrutura fitossocióloga de um trecho de vegetação arbórea no parque estadual do rio doce - Minas Gerais, Brasil. (in Portuguese). Acta Botanica Brasilica. ISSN 1677-941X
- Pacheco, Emerson Diniz (2008). Diagnóstico do impacto do uso das trilhas do Parque Estadual do Rio Doce. (Thesis) (in Portuguese). UNEC
- Peixoto, Esperanca de Lacerda (2011). Caracterização e perspectivas do Parque Estadual do Rio Doce - MG: uma abordagem a partir de imagens de sensoriamento remoto e fotografias hemisféricas de dossel. (Thesis) (in Portuguese). UFMG.
- Sausen, Tania Maria; Lacruz, María Silvia Pardi (2015). Sensoriamento remoto para desastres (in Portuguese). São Paulo: Oficina de Textos. ISBN 85-7975-178-0
