= Lake Sachavacayoc =

Lake in Peru

- Location within Peru
- Location: Madre de Dios Region, Tambopata Province, Tambopata District
- Coordinates: 12°53′43.95″S 69°21′30.88″W
- Basin countries: Peru

Lake Sachavacayoc (possibly from Quechua sach'awaka tapir, -yuq a suffix) is a lake in Tambopata National Reserve in Peru. It is located in the Madre de Dios Region, Tambopata Province, Tambopata District. The lake lies in a remote area near the Tambopata River.

== See also ==
- List of lakes in Peru
