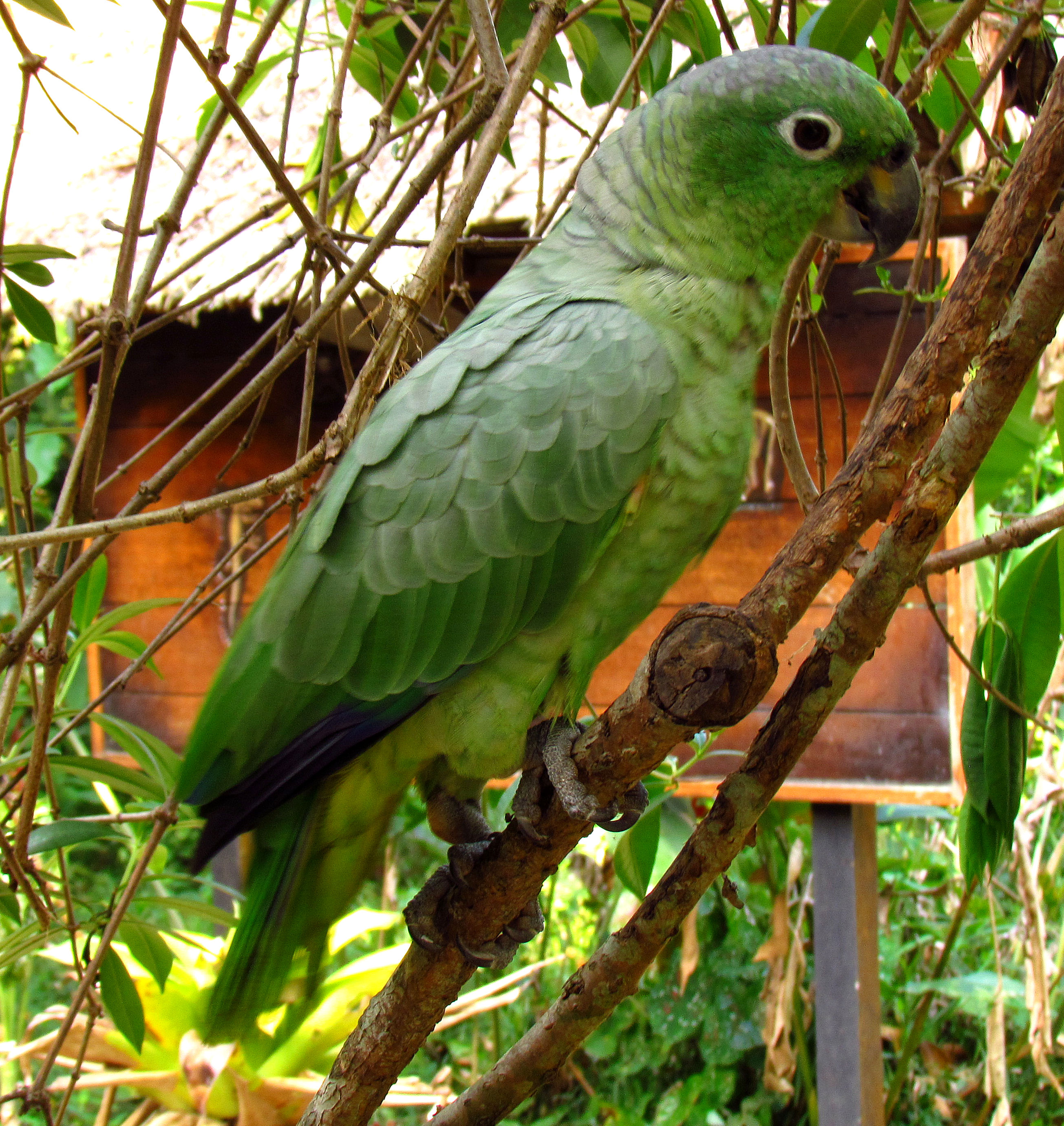
- Tambopata River, Peru Southern mealy amazon calls, recorded in Madre de Dios, Peru

Conservation status
- Least Concern (IUCN 3.1)

Scientific classification
- Kingdom: Animalia
- Phylum: Chordata
- Class: Aves
- Order: Psittaciformes
- Family: Psittacidae
- Genus: Amazona
- Species: A. farinosa

Binomial name
- Amazona farinosa (Boddaert, 1783)

= Mealy amazon =

Species of bird

The mealy amazon or mealy parrot (Amazona farinosa) is among the largest parrots in the genus Amazona, the amazon parrots. It is a mainly green parrot with a total length of 38–41 cm (15–16 in). It is native to tropical Central and South America. This species, the southern mealy amazon (Amazona farinosa farinosa), the northern mealy amazon (Amazona farinosa guatemalae) are considered conspecific.

== Taxonomy ==
- A. f. guatemalae: Found from southeastern Mexico to Honduras. Also known as the northern mealy amazon, blue-crowned mealy amazon or the Guatemalan amazon.
- A. f. virenticeps: Found in Nicaragua to western Panama. Also known as the Costa Rican mealy amazon or the green-headed amazon.
- A. f. farinosa : Found in tropical Central and South America. Also known as the southern mealy amazon.

The mealy amazon was described by the French polymath Georges-Louis Leclerc, Comte de Buffon in 1780 in his Histoire Naturelle des Oiseaux from a specimen collected in Cayenne, French Guiana. The bird was also illustrated in a hand-coloured plate engraved by François-Nicolas Martinet in the Planches Enluminées D'Histoire Naturelle which was produced under the supervision of Edme-Louis Daubenton to accompany Buffon's text. Neither the plate caption nor Buffon's description included a scientific name but in 1783 the Dutch naturalist Pieter Boddaert coined the binomial name Psittacus farinosus in his catalogue of the Planches Enluminées. The mealy amazon is now placed in the large Neotropical genus Amazona that was introduced by the French naturalist René Lesson in 1830. The species is monotypic. The specific epithet farinosa is from the Latin farinosus meaning "sprinkled with flour", referring to down feather § powder down.

== Description ==
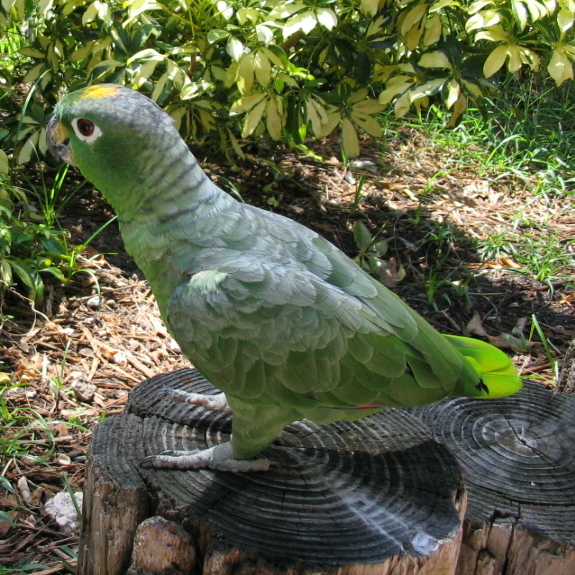
Note the characteristic mealy ("flour") texture over the back and nape of neck.

The mealy amazon has a total length of about 38–41 cm (15–16 in) and weighs 540–700 g (19–25 oz). Captives commonly are heavier. It is among the largest parrots in the Americas, mainly being surpassed by the large macaws. It has a relatively short and square shaped tail, as do the other members of the Amazona genus.

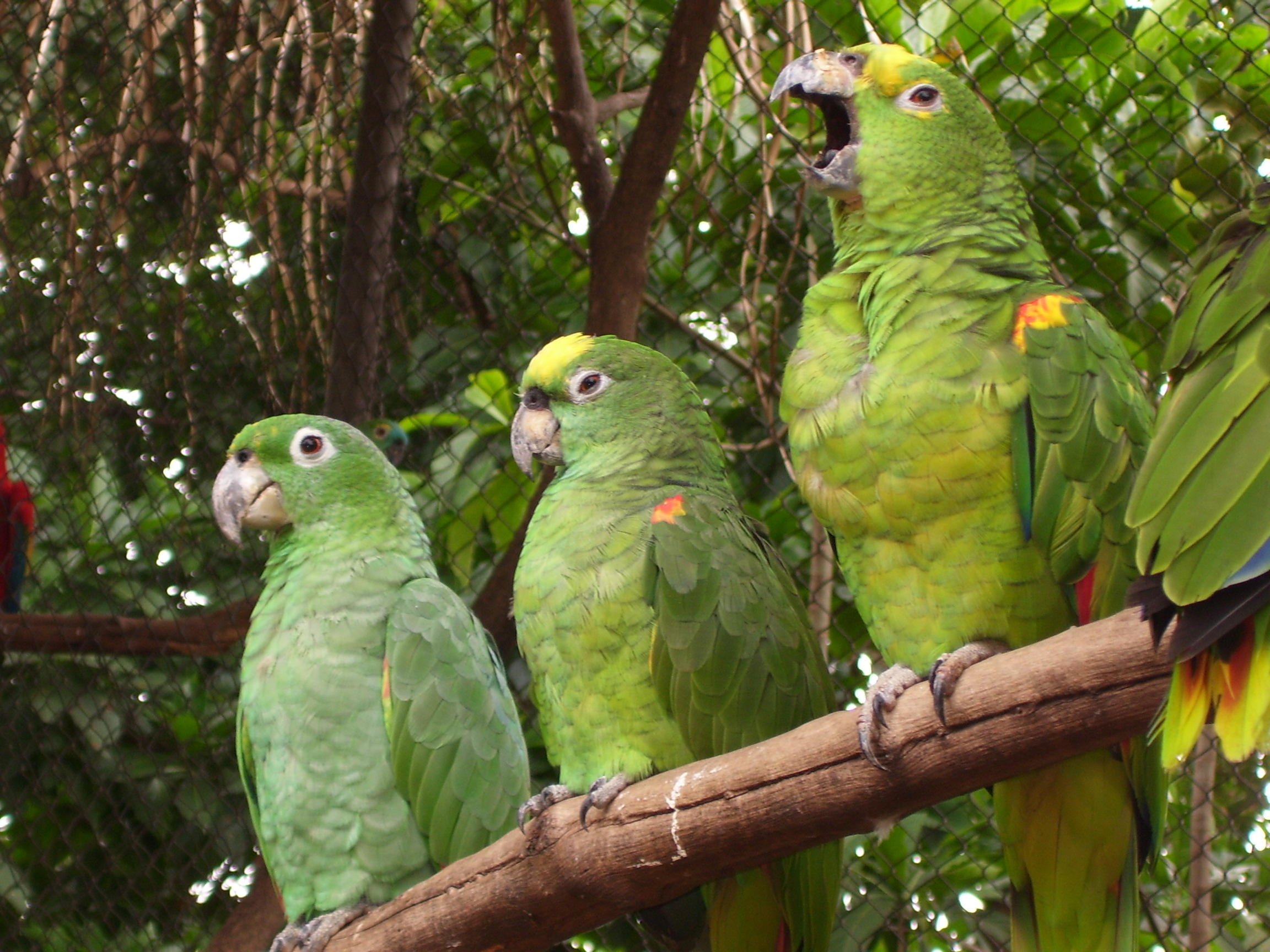
A mealy amazon (left) with two yellow-crowned amazons (right and center)

The mealy amazon is mainly green. The back and nape often have a whitish tinge; almost as if it had been covered in a thin layer of flour ("meal"; hence its name). The distal half of the tail is paler and more yellow than the basal half, thus resulting in a distinctly bi-colored look. In flight it shows a bluish-black trailing edge to the wing and a conspicuous red speculum. Occasionally a few yellow feathers are apparent on the top of the head.

In South America, it is commonly confused with the yellow-crowned amazon, but can be recognized by its larger size, less yellow to the crown (not entirely reliable, as some yellow-crowned may show almost none), the whitish tinge to its plumage, broader white eye-ring, and red of the leading edge of the wing placed near the phalanx (not near the radiale), but this is often difficult to see (especially on perched birds). Their voices are also strikingly different.

== Distribution and habitat ==
The mealy amazon occurs in tropical Central America and South America. It frequents humid to semi-humid forest (only rarely in deciduous forest) and plantations. In regions dominated by open/dry habitats it is restricted to gallery forest or completely absent.

== Behaviour ==
The mealy amazon is social and can be found in pairs or in large flocks. They are even known to interact with other parrots, such as macaws. They are usually quiet but can be loud at dusk and dawn. In captivity, they are known as one of the gentlest and calmest of all amazons.

=== Breeding ===
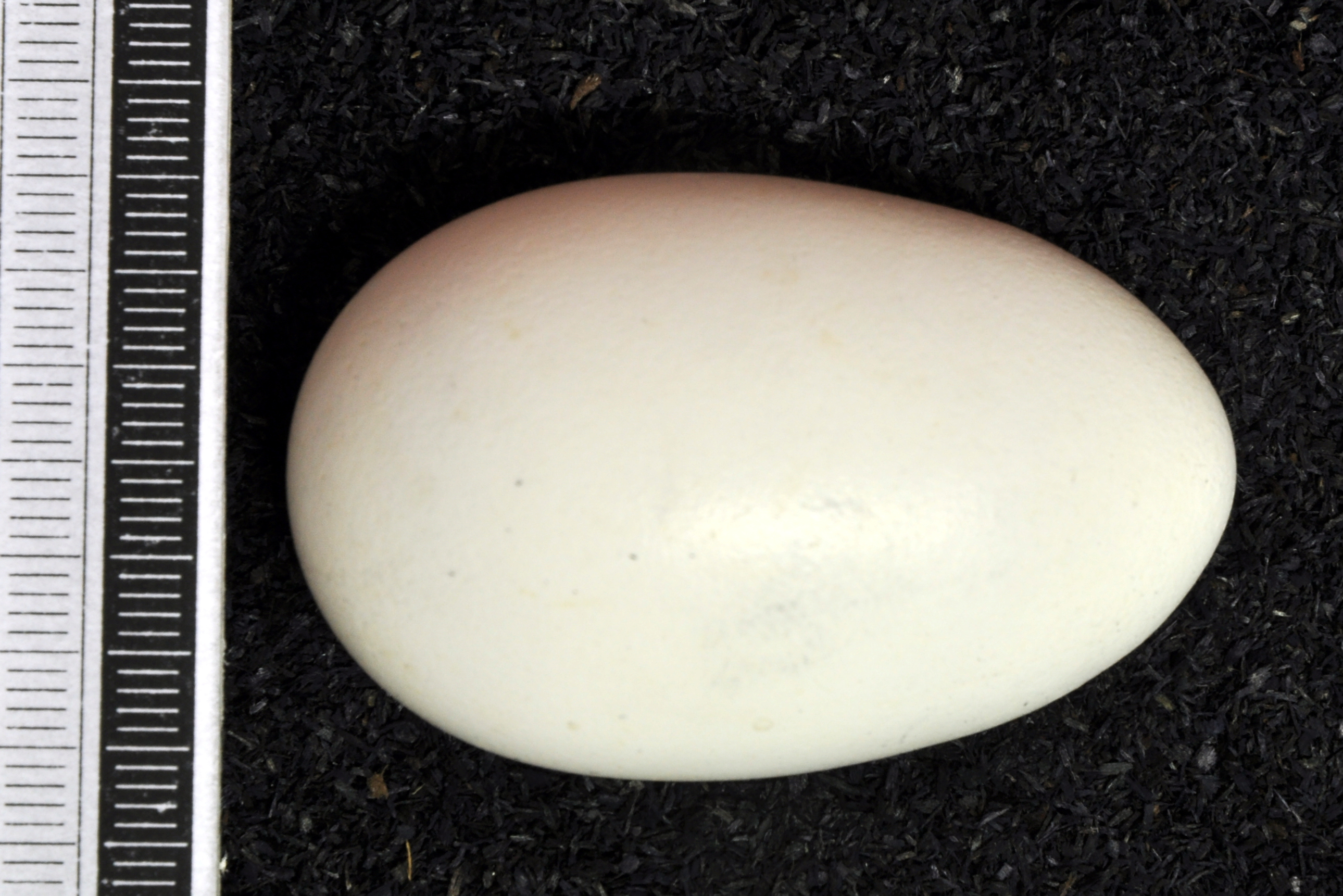
Egg, Collection Museum Wiesbaden

After mealy amazons reach sexual maturity they usually form monogamous relationships with a single partner. Each year courtship usually begins in early spring, and the female will usually lay three or four white eggs in a tree-cavity nest. The female incubates the eggs for about 26 days. The male regurgitates food for the female during the incubation period, and later for the chicks in the nest as well. The chicks leave the nest about 60 days after hatching.

=== Food and feeding ===
The diet of the mealy amazon consists mostly of fruits, seeds, berries, nuts, blossoms, and leaf buds.

== Status and conservation ==
It is fairly common in most of its range, but has declined locally due to habitat loss and trapping for the wild parrot trade. Trafficking of the birds (as for exotic pets) is illegal in many nations, but the species are still smuggled into the United States from Mexico. In some areas mealy amazons are hunted as food. The mealy amazon sometimes feeds on human crops (especially corn) and may be considered a crop pest.

The mealy amazon is bred in captivity with some regularity. It is sometimes kept as a companion parrot and is reported by owners to have a calm, gentle, docile and affectionate temperament towards humans.
