= Tambopata District =

Coordinates: 12.5766°S 69.1859°W

Tambopata Tampupata
- District
- Location of Tambopata in the Tambopata province
- Country: Peru
- Region: Madre de Dios
- Province: Tambopata
- Founded: December 26, 1912
- Capital: Puerto Maldonado

Government
  - Mayor: Luis Alberto Bocangel Ramirez

Area
  - Total: 22,218.6 km^{2} (8,578.6 sq mi)
- Elevation: 186 m (610 ft)

Population (2005 census)
  - Total: 51,384
  - Density: 2.3127/km^{2} (5.9898/sq mi)
- Time zone: UTC-5 (PET)
- UBIGEO: 170101

Tambopata District is one of four districts of the Tambopata Province in the Madre de Dios Region in Peru.

The Tambopata National Reserve and the Bahuaja-Sonene National Park are one of the most biodiverse places on earth. Records include over 700 species of birds, 1200 species of butterfly, 90 species of mammals, 120 species of reptiles and amphibians and innumerable species of insect. Over 400 species of birds have been recorded.

There are some centres dedicated to the research of eagles, snakes and all the animals that live on the Amazon River.

== See also ==
- Condenado Lake
- Sach'awakayuq
- Tambopata River
