= Las Piedras =

Las Piedras may refer to:

- Las Piedras, Artigas, a suburb of Bella Unión, Uruguay
- Las Piedras, Puerto Rico, a town and municipality in the central eastern region of the island
- Las Piedras, Uruguay, a city in the Canelones Department
- Las Piedras, Venezuela, a town and sea port in the Punto Fijo metropolitan area
- Las Piedras District, in Tambopata province, Peru
- Piedras River (Peru)
