= Rio Doce State Park =

State park in Minas Gerais, Brazil

- Parque Estadual do Rio Doce
- IUCN category II (national park)
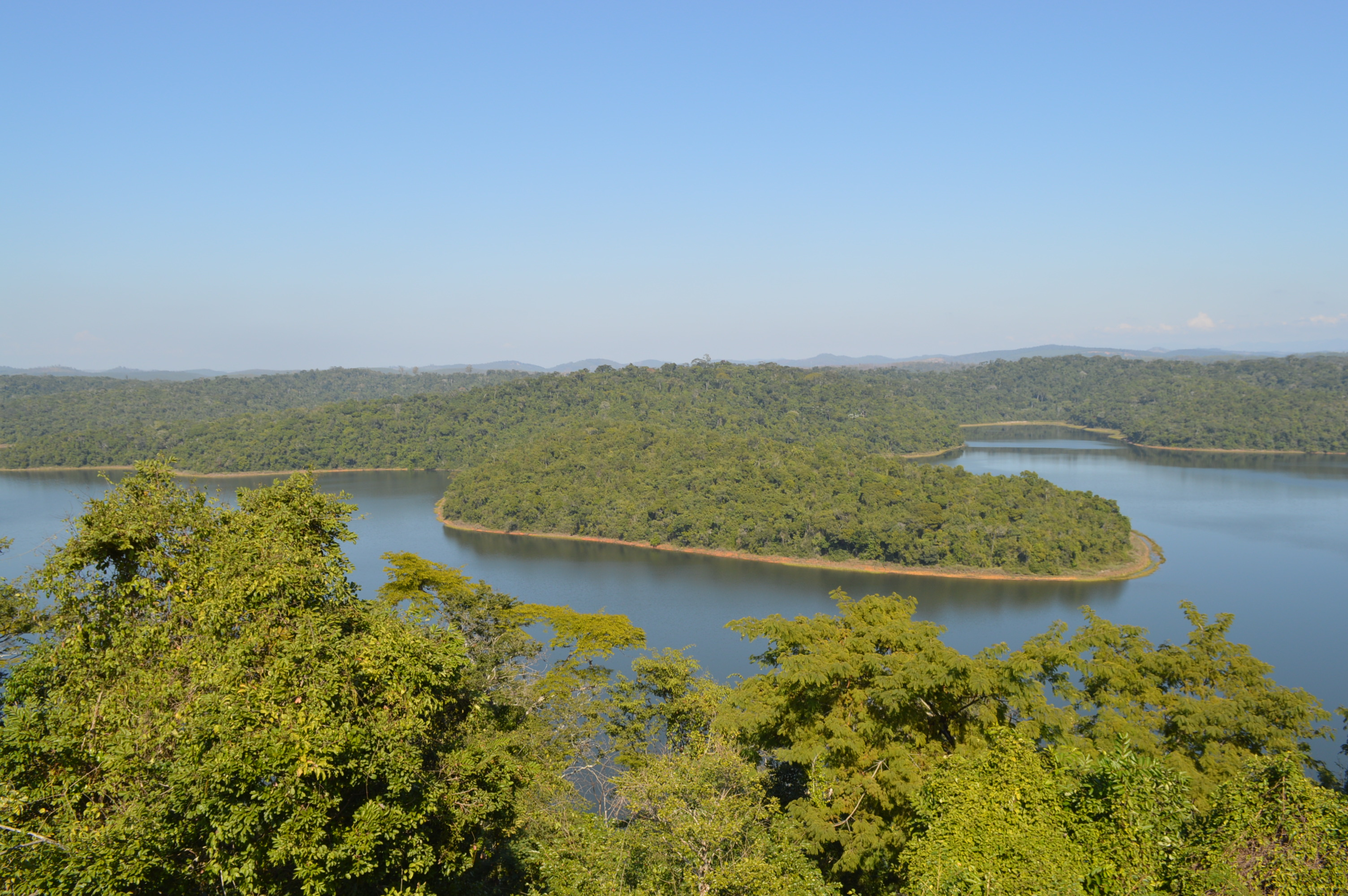
- Dom Helvécio lagoon

- Location within Brazil
- Nearest city: Marliéria, Minas Gerais
- Coordinates: 19°39′13″S 42°32′08″W
- Area: 35,970 ha (138.9 sq mi)
- Designation: State park
- Created: 14 July 1944
- Administrator: Instituto Estadual de Florestas MG

Ramsar Wetland
- Official name: Rio Doce State Park
- Designated: 15 March 2010
- Reference no.: 1900

The Rio Doce State Park (Portuguese: Parque Estadual do Rio Doce) is a state park in the state of Minas Gerais, Brazil. It protects a large remnant of Atlantic Forest, and includes a system of lagoons rich in species of native fish.

== Location ==
The Rio Doce State Park is in the southwest of Minas Gerais, 248 kilometres (154 mi) from Belo Horizonte, in the Vale do Aço region. It is divided between the municipalities of Marliéria, Dionísio and Timóteo. It has an area of 35,970 hectares (88,900 acres). The Doce River forms the eastern boundary of the park, and its tributary the Piracicaba River forms the northern boundary.

The park protects part of the third largest lake system in Brazil after the Amazon and the Pantanal of Mato Grosso. This is a system of forty natural lagoons including the 6.7 square kilometres (2.6 sq mi) Lagoa Dom Helvécio, with a depth of up to 32.5 metres (107 ft). The lake system is at an altitude of 300 metres (980 ft). The lakes are 20 metres (66 ft) above the river, and are not connected with the river system.

== History ==
Creation of the park was first suggested in the early 1930s by Dom Helvécio Gomes de Oliveira, Archbishop of Mariana. After a long campaign, the Rio Doce State Park was created by state decree-law 1.119 of 14 July 1944, the first state-level conservation unit in Minas Gerais. During the first years the park was not monitored and access was uncontrolled, so the fauna suffered considerably from unrestricted hunting and fishing. A fire in the dry season destroyed 9,000 hectares (22,000 acres) of forest, with 11 deaths.

In the 1970s some tourism infrastructure was established. A renovation was undertaken from 1986 to 1993, when the park was reopened to visitors. The park became an administrative unit of the State Forestry Institute (IEF) through law 11.337 of 1993. As of 2002, when the management plan was issued, 82% of land titles had been acquired by the state.

== Environment ==
Average annual rainfall is 1,480.3 millimetres (58.28 in), with a dry period from May to September. Mean annual temperature is 21.9 °C (71.4 °F). The park contains a remnant of Atlantic Forest, mostly seasonal semideciduous forest in various stages of succession. It is the largest contiguous remnant of Atlantic forest in Minas Gerais, with 1,129 plant species from 134 families. Trees such as jequitibá, garapa, vinhático and sapucaia are common. In some places rare specimens such as the jacarandá-da-baía and canela sassafrás also appear.

The park has rich fauna, including 77 species of mammals in 9 orders, with 7 species of primates. 12 species of mammal are on the national list of endangered species. 325 species of birds have been recorded, including 20 considered endangered. The lagoons are home to 27 species of fish. 38 species of amphibians have been recorded. Exotic species of fish such as Tucunaré (Cichla), piranha and oscar (Astronotus ocellatus) have caused changes to the food chain.

Mammals include the capybara (Hydrochoerus hydrochaeris), South American tapir (Tapirus terrestris), Black capuchin (Sapajus nigritus), Black-fronted titi monkey (Callicebus nigrifrons), lowland paca (Cuniculus paca), Gray brocket (Mazama gouazoubira) and common agoutis, and endangered species such as jaguar (Panthera onca), solitary tinamou (Tinamus solitarius) and the Northern muriqui (Brachyteles hypoxanthus). Birds species include the Green-backed trogon (Trogon viridis), Ornate hawk-eagle (Spizaetus ornatus), Southern mealy amazon (Amazona farinosa), dusky-legged guan (Penelope obscura), Rufous-vented ground cuckoo (Neomorphus geoffroyi), Red-ruffed fruitcrow (Pyroderus scutatus), Tanagers and Forbes's blackbird (Anumara forbesi).

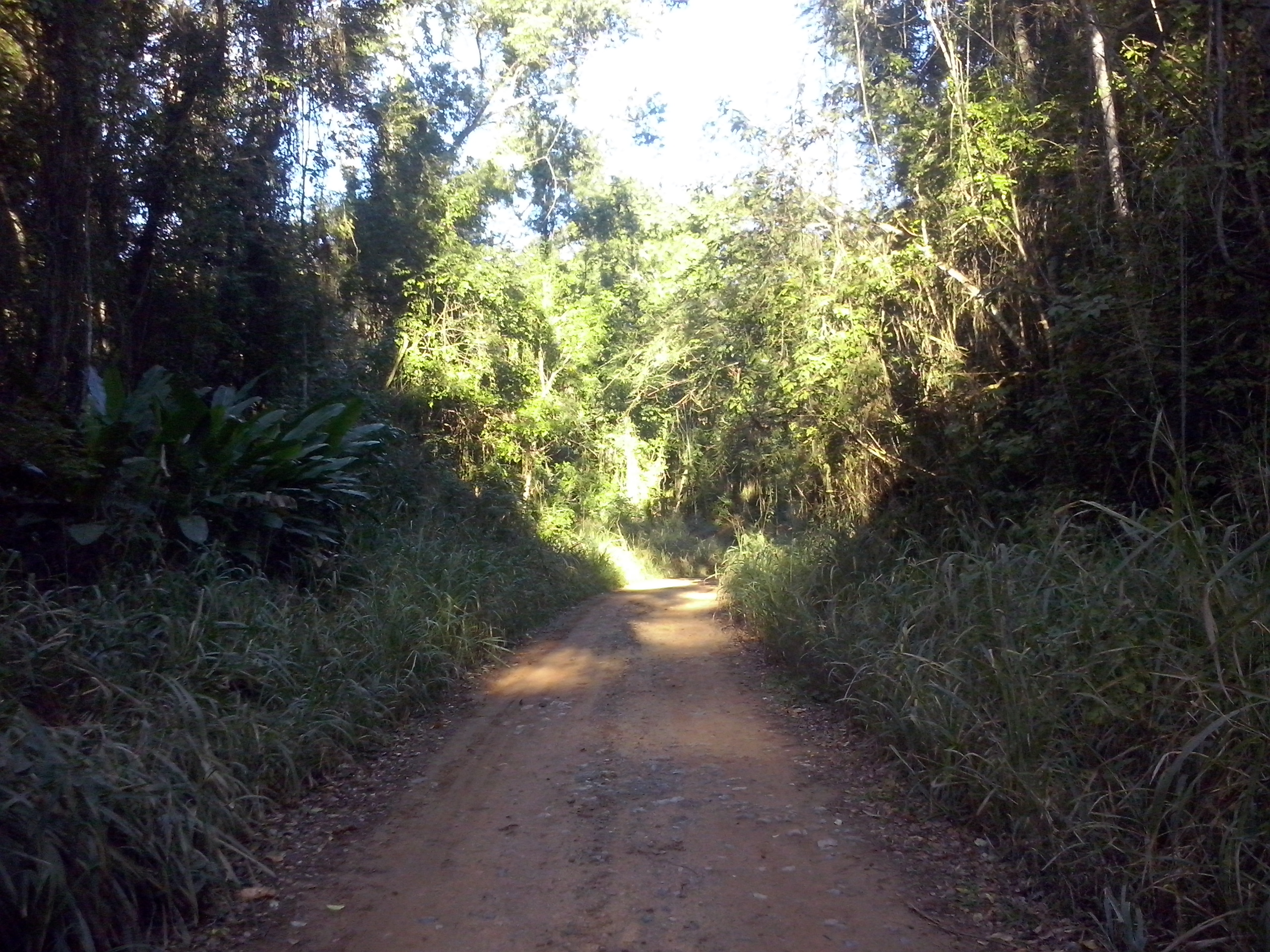
Road in the park interior

Threats include illegal hunting and fishing, fires, urban sprawl in the municipality of Timóteo and road kill on the Ponte Queimada road.

== Visiting ==
There were more than 21,000 visitors in 2000. The park is open for visits Tuesday to Sunday and holidays from 08:00 to 17:00. There is parking, a camping area, changing rooms, a restaurant, amphitheater, visitor center, research center, plant nursery and environment police post. The main attraction is the Lagoa Dom Helvécio, also known as Bishop's pond, where visitors can swim, fish, and make boat trips. There are also hiking trails in the woods.

The Dom Helvécio Lagoon in the southwest of the park is the largest natural lagoon in Brazil. There is a public beach on the bank of the lagoon at the end of the park road, 6 kilometres (3.7 mi) from the entrance, which may be used for swimming and sports fishing. It is delimited by a cord of buoys, and has male and female changing rooms. Lifeguards are on duty on long weekends. Sports fishing is allowed with limitations, and only earthworms are allowed as live bait. Kayaks and paddle boats can be rented. Rowing boats and boats with electric motors can be used to tour the lagoon, but disembarkation is not allowed.

== See also ==
- 1967 Rio Doce State Park wildfire

== Sources ==
- Marques, Chris, Conheça o Parque Estadual do Rio Doce (in Portuguese)
- Parque Estadual do Rio Doce (in Portuguese), IEF: Instituto Estadual de Florestas MG
- Parque Estadual do Rio Doce celebra seus 72 anos de criação (in Portuguese), Eu Amo Ipatinga
- Plano de Manejo: Parque Estadual do Rio Doce – Resumo (PDF) (in Portuguese), IEF
