= Sandoval (disambiguation) =

Sandoval is a surname of Spanish origin.

Sandoval may also refer to:

== Places ==
- Sandoval County, New Mexico, United States
- Sandoval Township, Marion County, Illinois, United States
- Sandoval, Illinois, United States, a village
- Sandoval, Texas, United States, a census-designated place
- Lake Sandoval, Peru

== Naval vessels ==
- USS Sandoval (1895), an Alvarado-class patrol boat
- USS Sandoval (APA-194), a Haskell-class attack transport

== See also ==
- Alexander v. Sandoval, a 2001 U.S. Supreme Court case deciding on disparate impact private suits
- United States v. Sandoval, a 1913 U.S. Supreme Court case deciding that the federal Congress had to right to govern U.S. Native American Indians and not the states
