= Laberinto District =

Coordinates: 12.7181°S 69.5867°W

Laberinto
- District
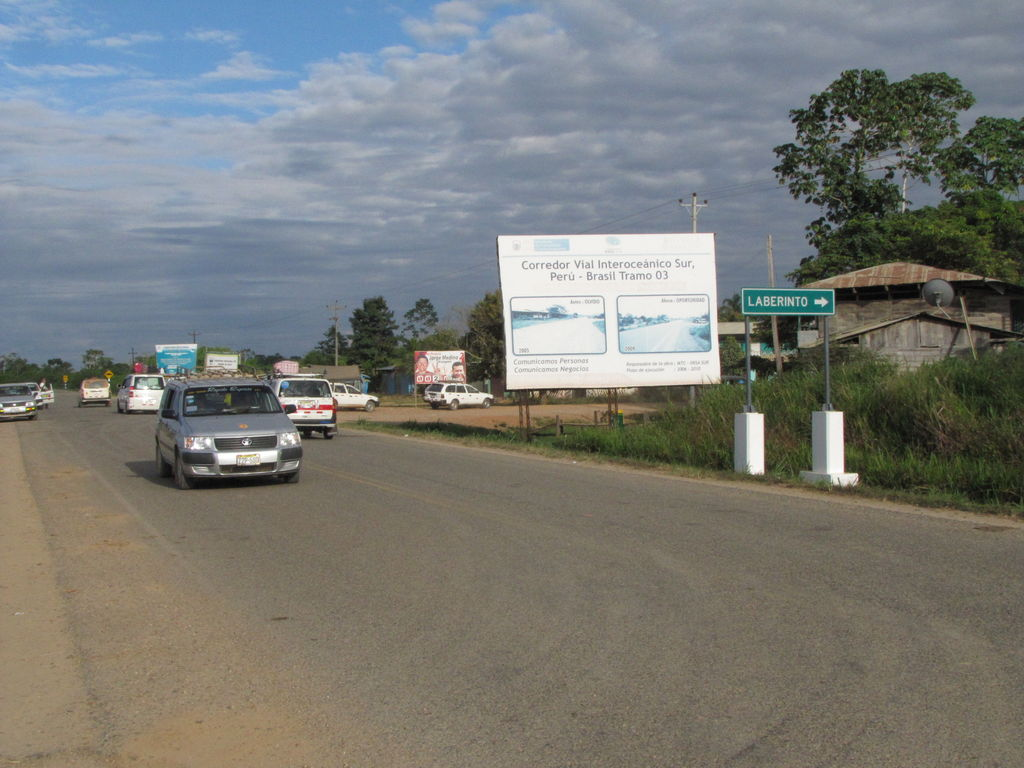

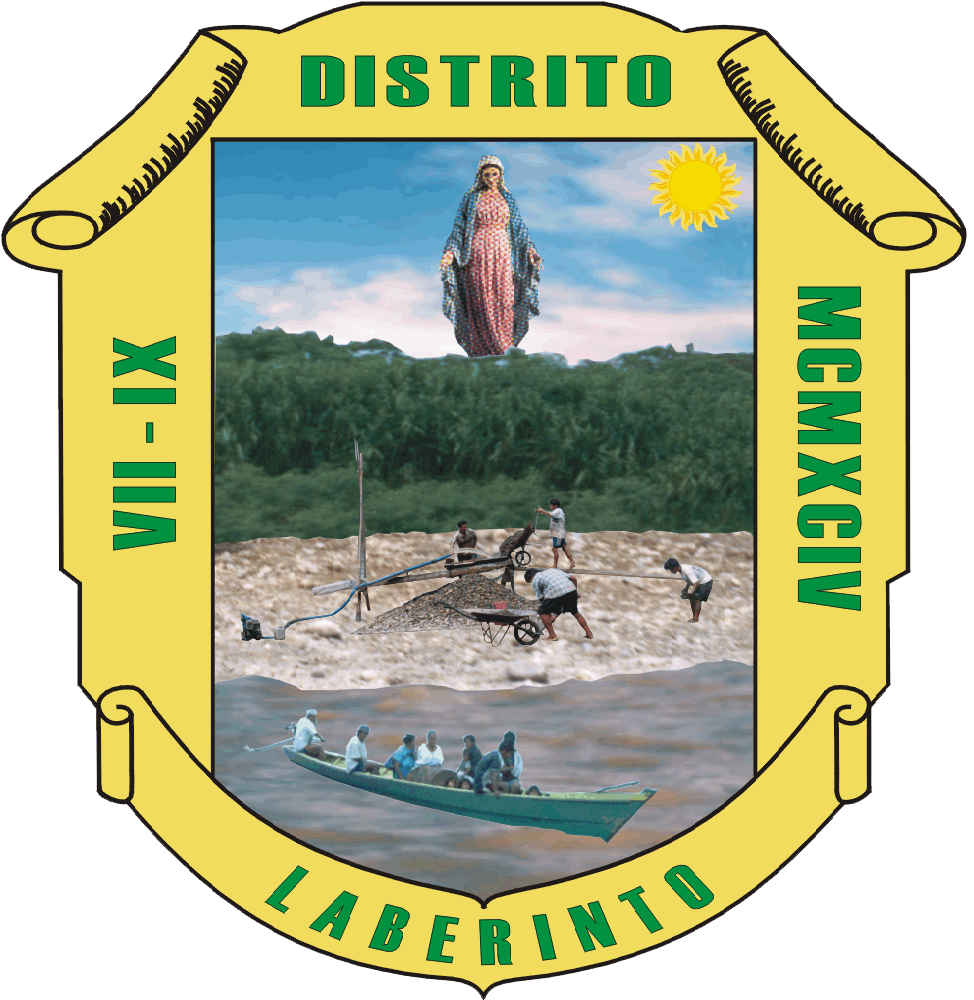
- Coat of arms

- Location of Laberinto in the Tambopata province
- Country: Peru
- Region: Madre de Dios
- Province: Tambopata
- Founded: September 9, 1994
- Capital: Puerto Rosario de Laberinto

Government
  - Mayor: Eleuterio Muñiz Huaman

Area
  - Total: 2,760.9 km^{2} (1,066.0 sq mi)
- Elevation: 200 m (660 ft)

Population (2005 census)
  - Total: 4,954
  - Density: 1.794/km^{2} (4.647/sq mi)
- Time zone: UTC-5 (PET)
- UBIGEO: 170104

Laberinto District is one of four districts of the province Tambopata in Peru.
