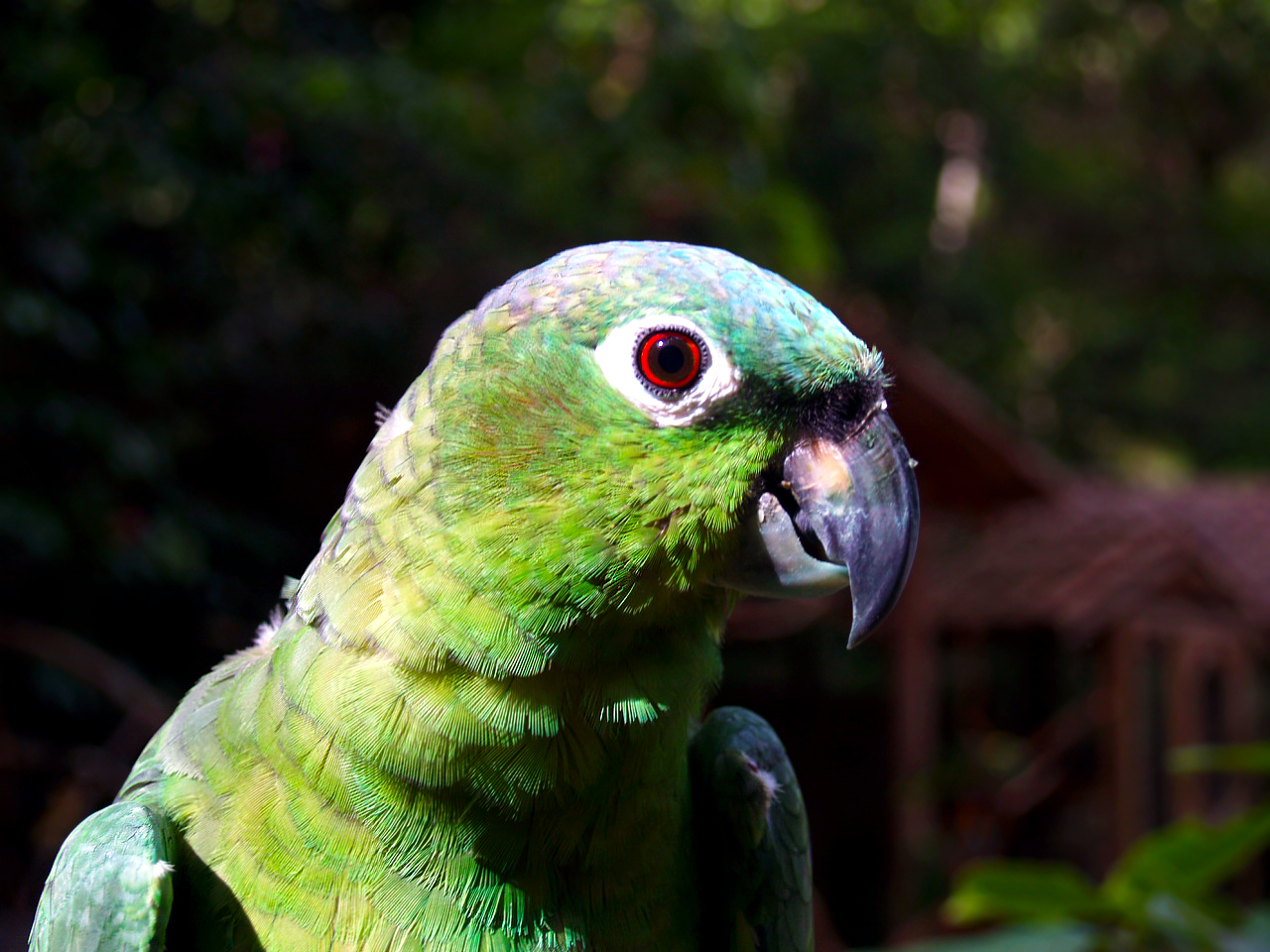

Conservation status
- Near Threatened (IUCN 3.1)

Scientific classification
- Kingdom: Animalia
- Phylum: Chordata
- Class: Aves
- Order: Psittaciformes
- Family: Psittacidae
- Genus: Amazona
- Species: A. farinosa
- Subspecies: A. f. guatemalae

Trinomial name
- Amazona farinosa guatemalae (PL Sclater, 1860)

= Northern mealy amazon =

Species of bird

The northern mealy amazon or northern mealy parrot (Amazona farinosa guatemalae) is among the largest parrots in the genus Amazona, the amazon parrots. It is a mainly green parrot with a total length of 38–41 cm (15–16 in). It is endemic to tropical Central America. This parrot and the southern mealy amazon (Amazona farinosa farinosa) are conspecific, having previously been considered separate species.

== Description ==
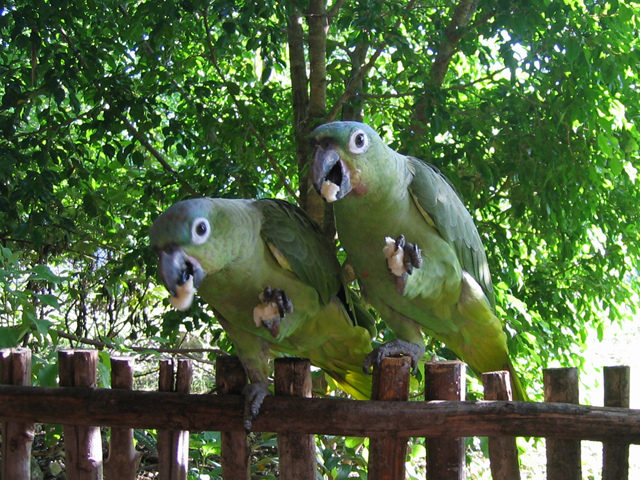
Two blue-crowned mealy amazons eating banana in Guatemala

The northern mealy amazon has a total length of about 38–41 cm (15–16 in) and weighs 540–700 g (19–25 oz). It has a relatively short and squarish tail, as do the other members of the Amazona genus.

The northern mealy amazon is mainly green. The back and nape often have a whitish tinge; almost as if it had been covered in a thin layer of flour ("meal"; hence its name). The distal half of the tail is paler and more yellow than the basal half, thus resulting in a distinctly bi-colored look. In flight it shows a bluish-black trailing edge to the wing and a conspicuous red speculum. Occasionally a few yellow feathers are apparent on the top of the head and it has a bluish-tinged crown. The maroon to orange eyes (which typically appear dark from a distance) are surrounded by a relatively broad white eye-ring of bare skin.

== Distribution and habitat ==
The northern mealy amazon occurs in tropical Central America. It frequents humid to semi-humid forest (only rarely in deciduous forest) and plantations. In regions dominated by open/dry habitats it is restricted to gallery forest or completely absent.

== Behavior ==
The northern mealy amazon is social and can be found in pairs or in large flocks. They are even known to interact with other parrots, such as macaws. They are usually quiet but can be loud at dusk and dawn.

=== Diet ===
The diet of the northern mealy amazon consists mostly of fruits, seeds, berries, nuts, blossoms, and leaf buds.

== Breeding ==
After northern mealy amazons reach sexual maturity they usually form monogamous relationships with a single partner. Each year courtship usually begins in early spring, and the female will usually lay three or four white eggs in a tree-cavity nest. The female incubates the eggs for about 26 days. The male regurgitates food for the female during the incubation period, and later for the chicks in the nest as well. The chicks leave the nest about 60 days after hatching.

== Status and conservation ==
It is fairly common in most of its range, but has declined locally due to habitat loss and trapping for the wild parrot trade. Trafficking of the birds (as for exotic pets) is illegal in many nations, but the species are still smuggled into the United States from Mexico. The northern mealy amazon sometimes feeds on human crops (especially corn) and may be considered a crop pest.
