= Silkhenge =

Structures made of silk by spiders

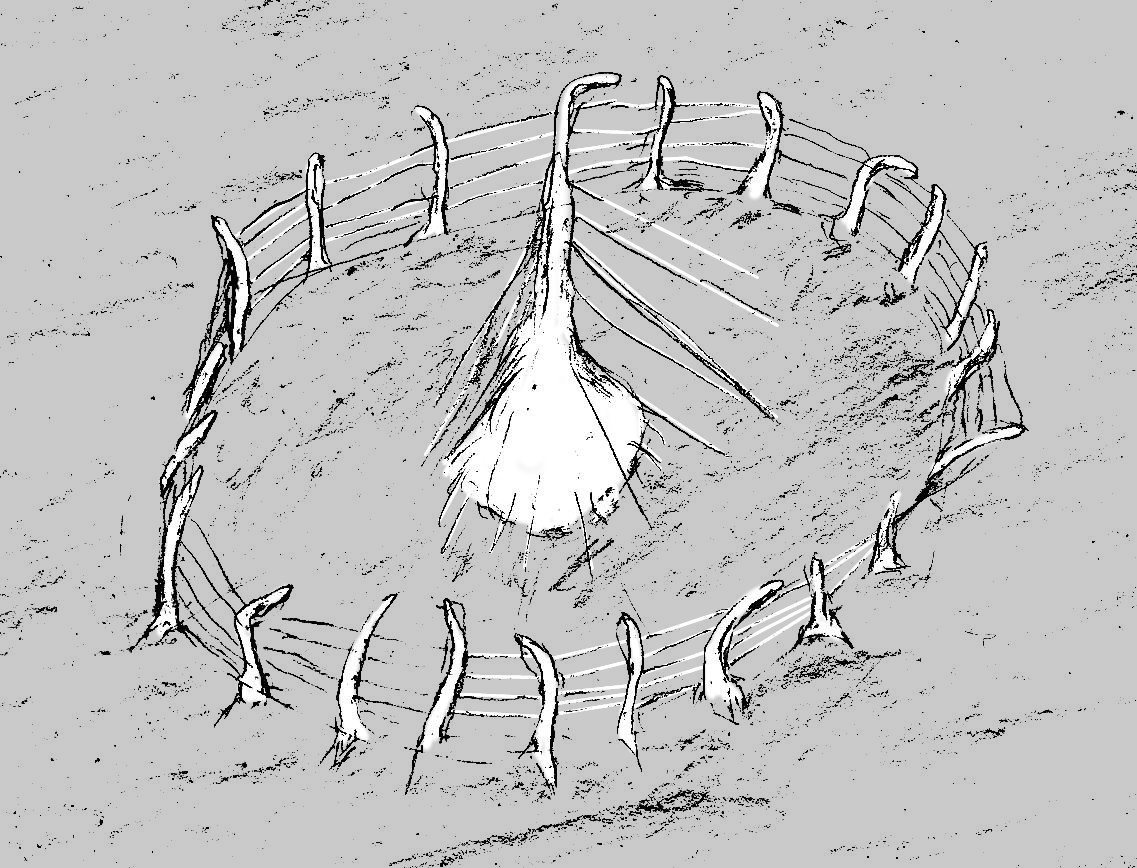
Artist's rendering of a typical silkhenge structure

Silkhenge structures are a means of spider reproduction used by one or more currently-unknown species of spider. It typically consists of a central "spire" constructed of spider silk, containing one to two eggs, surrounded by a sort of fence of silk in a circle.

== Discovery ==
In August 2013, Georgia Tech student Troy Alexander was visiting Tambopata National Reserve in Peru. He found, under a tarpaulin, a tiny bit of silk in a circular pattern approximately one inch in diameter. Upon further investigation of the area, Alexander found three additional similar structures. He posted a picture on Reddit asking for help identifying it. No information was forthcoming, as this turned out to be a completely unknown phenomenon. His discovery acquired the name "silkhenge" because of its similarity to Stonehenge.

At the end of that year, an eight-day expedition led by Phil Torres found dozens more examples of this phenomenon, generally on the trunks of bamboo and cecropia trees. Spiderlings hatching from the structures were documented, but like many baby arthropods they lacked the features typically used to identify adults, and none lived to adulthood. DNA tests were also inconclusive, so the species creating these structures remained unidentified. A video was posted on YouTube of spiderlings hatching.

One hypothesized purpose of the fence is that it serves to trap mites and other small arthropods known to share the same habitat. This could, in turn, secure a food source that would be easily accessible to the spiderlings upon hatching. It has also been proposed that it protects the eggs and spiderlings from possible predators such as ants.
