= Lake Sandoval =

Lake in Peru

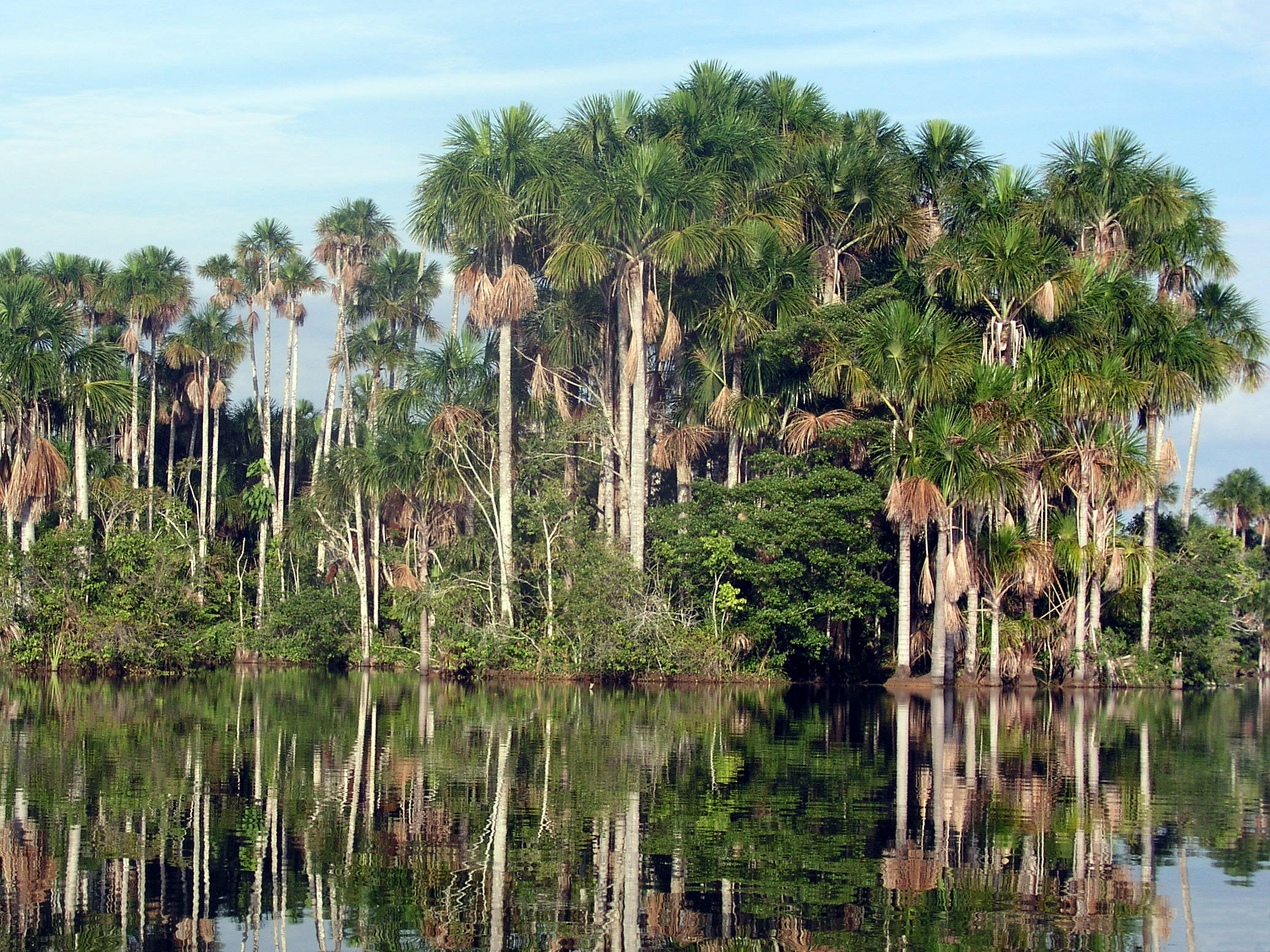

- Location within Peru
- Location: Madre de Dios Region
- Coordinates: 12.605548°S 69.041885°W
- Basin countries: Peru

Lake Sandoval is an oxbow lake in the Amazon basin. It's located in the Department of Madre de Dios in southeastern Peru, about 16 km (9.9 mi) from the city of Puerto Maldonado. It is a part of the Tambopata Candamo Reserved Zone. Lake Sandoval is one of the largest oxbow lakes in southeastern Peru, with a surface area of about 125 ha (310 acres).

It is one of the most popular tourist destinations in the Madre de Dios region, particularly for ecotourism, and it is also a popular site for research purposes. There is a touristic hike from the river Madre de Dios to the lake. Wildlife known to live in or near the river includes parrots, macaws and some other species from the rain forest. The lake is also known for having black caimans (Melanosuchus niger) and giant river otters (Pteronura brasiliensis).

An aquaculture facility near the lake cultivated arapaima (Arapaima gigas) and other species in the 1970s. In 1979, flooding of the Madre de Dios River led to the escape of about 1,000 arapaima fry into Lake Sandoval, and the larger Madre de Dios River watershed, when rising waters reached the aquaculture ponds they were contained in. Arapaima were subsequently reported in surrounding waterbodies in Peru by the mid 1980s, and by the early 1990s arapaima were reported from Bolivian waters. Reports of observations and of fishermen catching arapaima have since increased in frequency.

In 1998, in light of negative impacts caused by increasing human activity near the lake, the National Institute for Natural Resources (INRENA) requested assistance from the IUCN's Giant Otter Project in the development of a giant otter tourism management plan for Lake Sandoval and the larger Tambopata Candamo Reserved Zone. An Interpretation and Control Centre and a control post - with three game wardens posted there by INRENA - were built from 2000-2002.

== See also ==
- List of lakes in Peru
