= Marliéria =

- Municipality
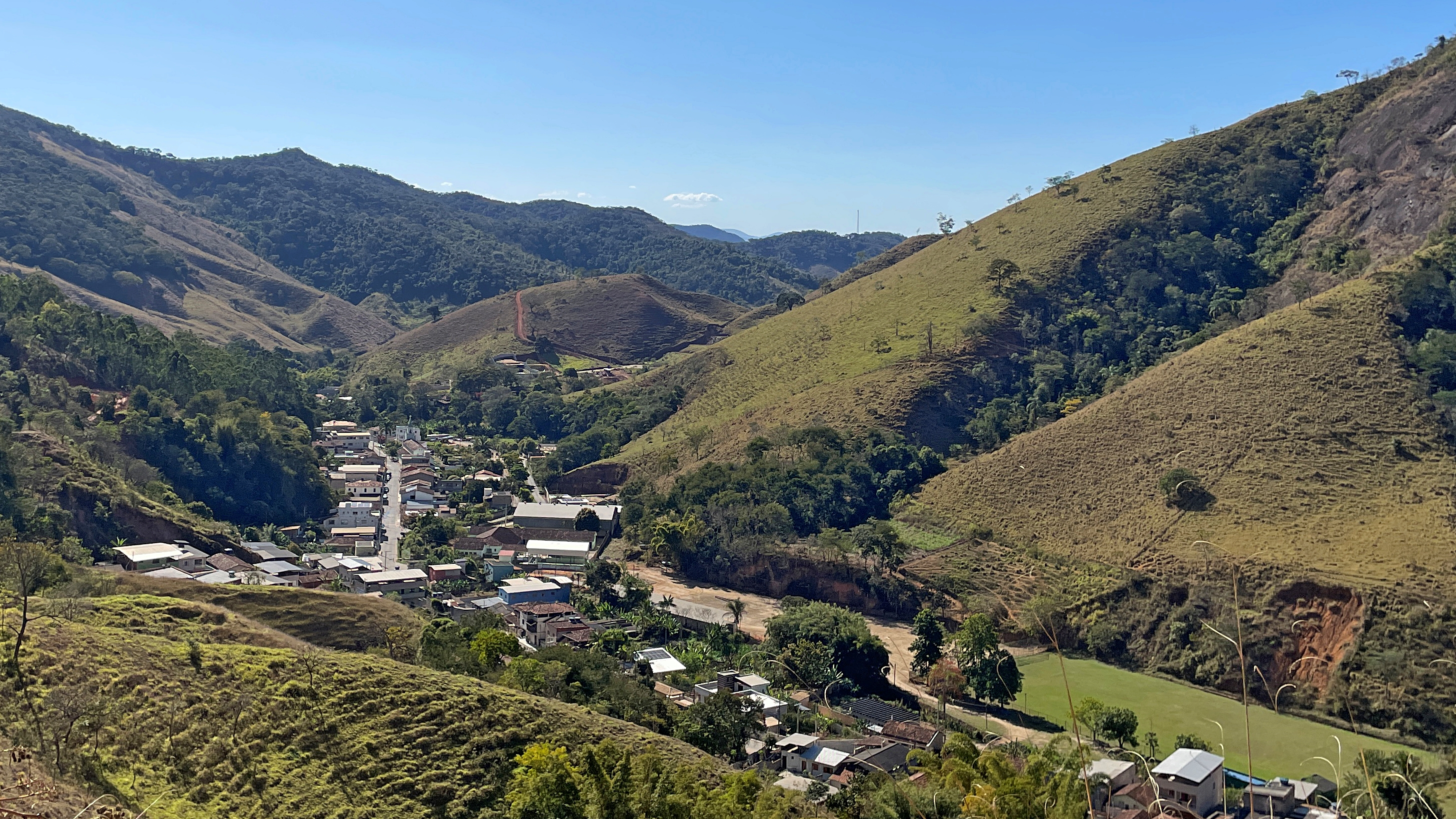
- Partial view of Marliéria

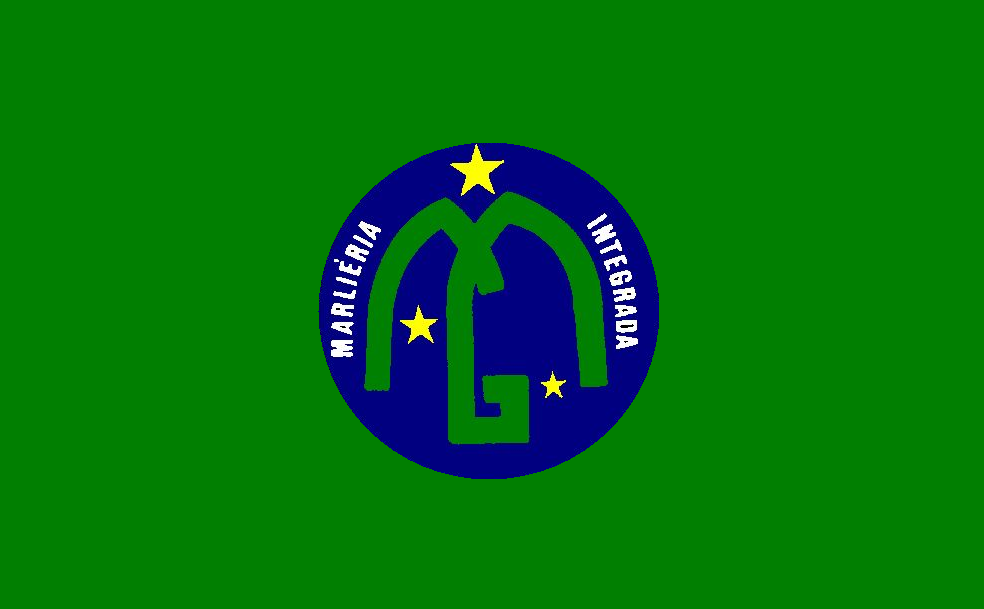
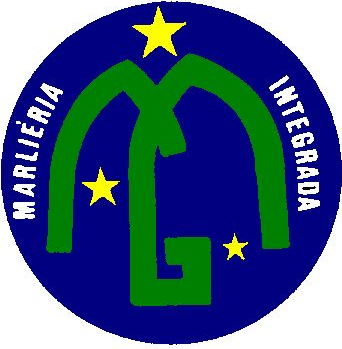
- Flag Seal

- Location in Brazil
- Coordinates: 19°42′43″S 42°43′55″W
- Country: Brazil
- Region: Southeast
- State: Minas Gerais
- Mesoregion: Vale do Rio Doce

Population (2022 Census)
  - Total: 4,592
  - Estimate (2025): 4,796
- Time zone: UTC−3 (BRT)

Marliéria is a municipality in the state of Minas Gerais in the Southeast region of Brazil.

The municipality contains part of the 35,970 hectares (88,900 acres) Rio Doce State Park, created in 1944, the first state-level conservation unit in Minas Gerais.

== See also ==
- List of municipalities in Minas Gerais
