= Tambopata province =

Coordinates: 12°36′S 69°12′W

Tambopata
- Province
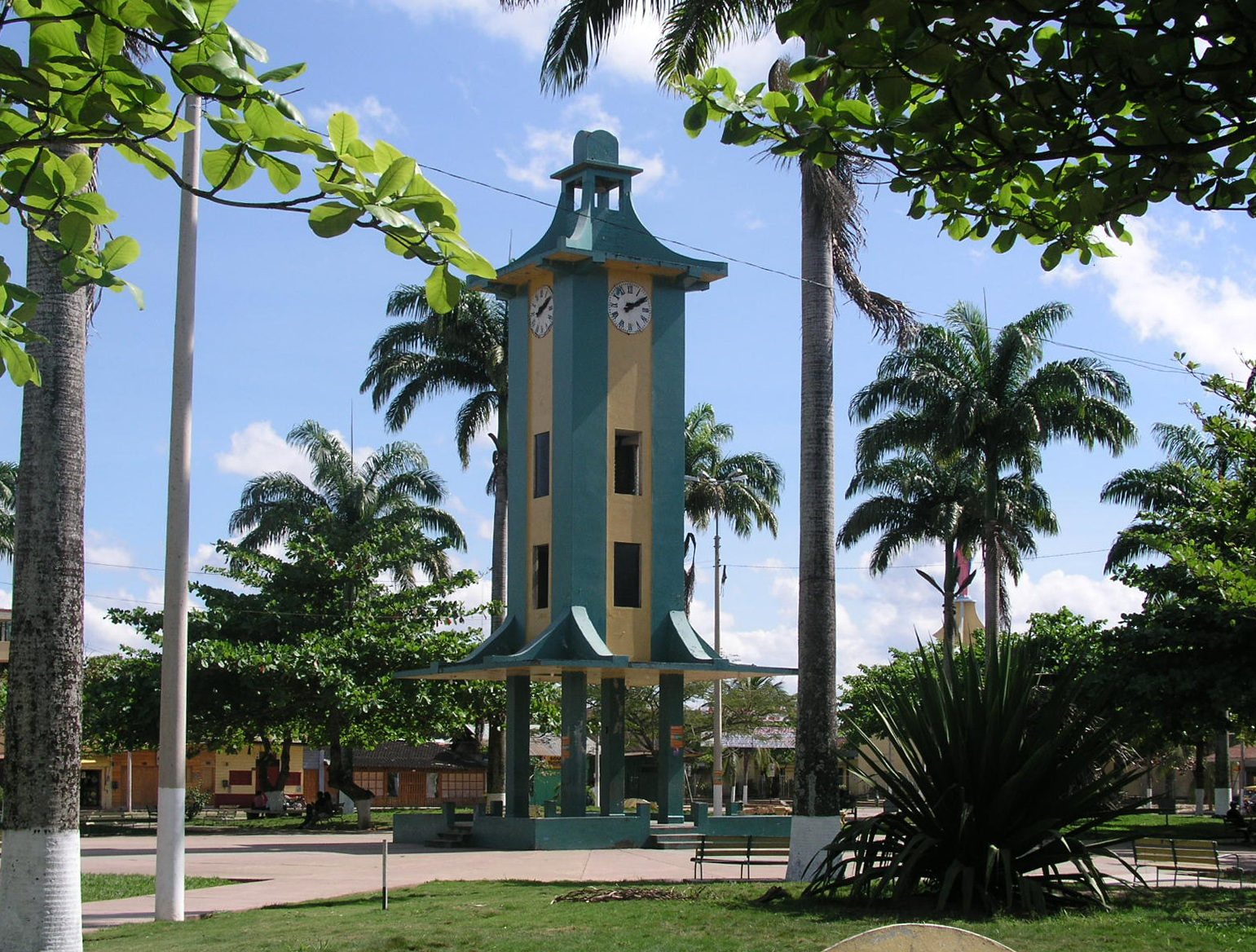

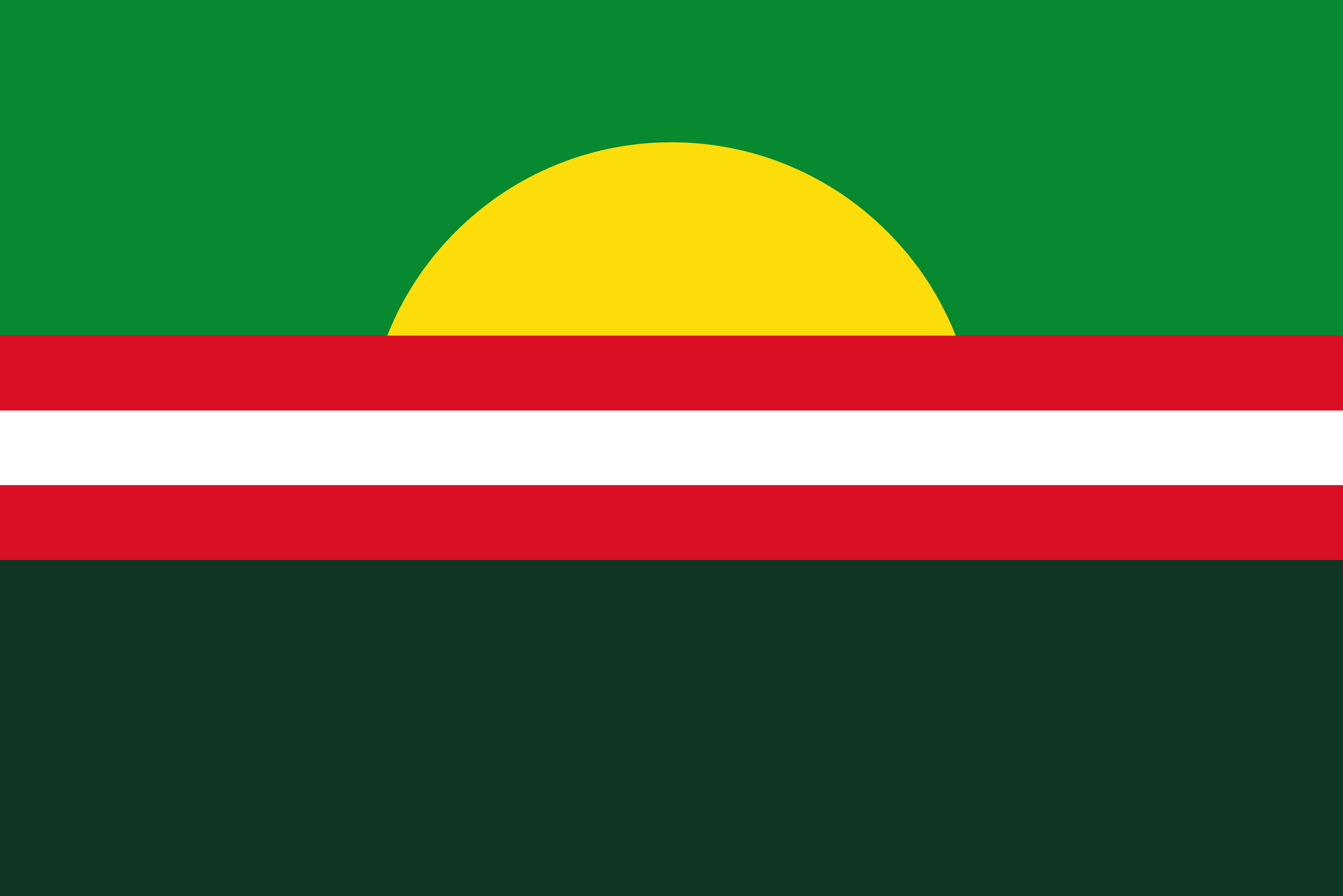
- Flag Coat of arms

- Location of Tambopata in Madre de Dios Region
- Country: Peru
- Region: Madre de Dios
- Capital: Puerto Maldonado

Government
  - Mayor: Francisco Keler Rengifo Khan (2019-2022)

Area
  - Total: 36,268.49 km^{2} (14,003.34 sq mi)

Population
  - Total: 67,298
  - Density: 1.8556/km^{2} (4.8059/sq mi)
- UBIGEO: 1701

Tambopata is the largest of three provinces in the Madre de Dios Region of Peru.

== Political division ==
The province is divided into four districts, which are:

- Inambari
- Laberinto
- Las Piedras
- Tambopata

=== Representation ===
This province has one communal representative to the regional government.

== See also ==
- Tambopata National Reserve
- Sach'awakayuq
