= Las Piedras District =

Coordinates: 12.2378°S 69.2779°W

Las Piedras
- District
- Location of Las Piedras in the Tambopata province
- Country: Peru
- Region: Madre de Dios
- Province: Tambopata
- Founded: December 26, 1912
- Capital: Las Piedras

Government
  - Mayor: José Angel Ayala Apaza

Area
  - Total: 7,032.21 km^{2} (2,715.15 sq mi)
- Elevation: 260 m (850 ft)

Population (2005 census)
  - Total: 6,072
  - Density: 0.8635/km^{2} (2.236/sq mi)
- Time zone: UTC-5 (PET)
- UBIGEO: 170103

Las Piedras District is one of four districts of the province Tambopata in Peru.

Bordered by the Rio Mavila on the northern boundary and the Rio Las Piedras to the south, the district comprises typical uninhabited lowland neotropical rainforest; largely moist broadleaf evergreen or semi-evergreen with overstorey canopy and emergent crowns; medium layer canopy; lower canopy; and shrub level and understory.

The forest-structure is influenced by the flood regimes of the Las Piedras River, a highly meandering, white-water affluent of the Madre de Dios River.
