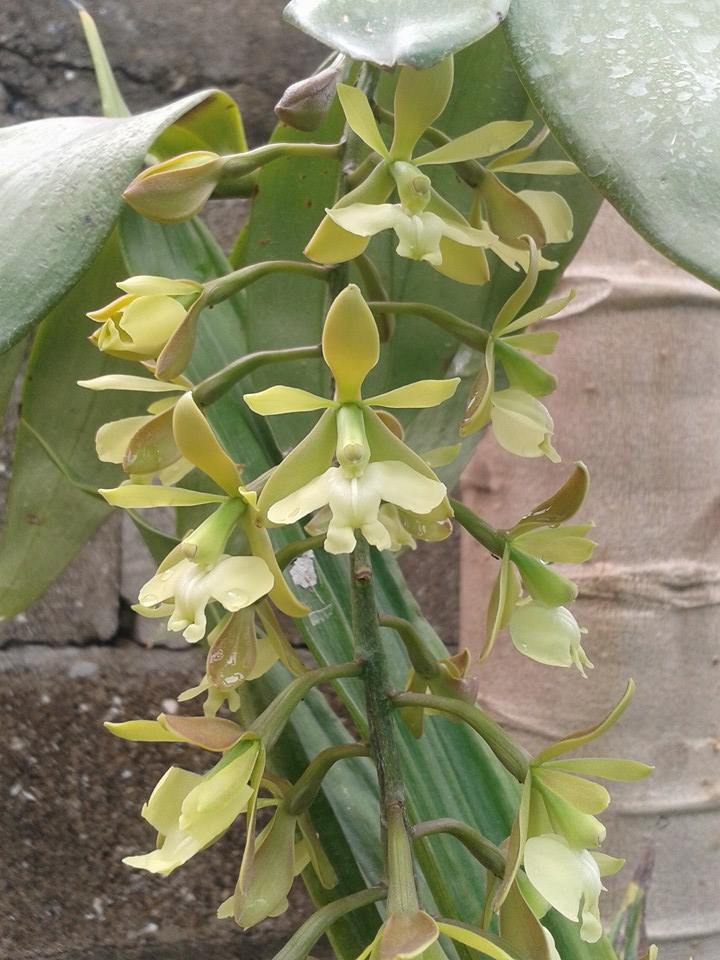

Scientific classification
- Kingdom: Plantae
- Clade: Tracheophytes
- Clade: Angiosperms
- Clade: Monocots
- Order: Asparagales
- Family: Orchidaceae
- Subfamily: Epidendroideae
- Tribe: Epidendreae
- Subtribe: Laeliinae
- Genus: Epidendrum
- Species: E. coronatum

Binomial name
- Epidendrum coronatum Ruiz & Pav.

Synonyms
- Epidendrum amazonicum Schltr.; Epidendrum benignum Ames; Epidendrum compositum Vell.; Epidendrum moyobambae Kraenzl.; Epidendrum subpatens Schltr.; Epidendrum sulphuroleucum Barb.Rodr.

= Epidendrum coronatum =

Species of orchid

Epidendrum coronatum is a reed-stemmed epiphytic Epidendrum orchid in the family Orchidaceae. It grows wild in the Neotropics at medium to low altitudes.

== Description ==
E. coronatum is a sympodial epiphyte that produces slightly thickened stems up to 70 cm long, covered by the basal sheaths of the fleshy, alternate, ovate-lanceolate leaves, which grow up to 10 cm long and 2.5 cm wide. The arching apical racemose inflorescence has small sheaths at its base, and carries many waxy-textured, green to cream colored flowers. The dorsal sepal, at 20 mm long, is slightly longer than the lateral sepals and the petals, which measure 18 mm. The lip is adnate to the column to its apex, and convex beyond the column. Ruiz and Pavon describe the lip as trilobate, with the medial lobe carrying two smaller divisions; Dodson and Vásquez use the term "4-lobed" to include the divergent processes of the medial lobe.
