= Dionísio, Minas Gerais =

Coordinates: 19°50′34″S 42°46′37″W

Dionísio
- Municipality
- Municipality of Dionísio
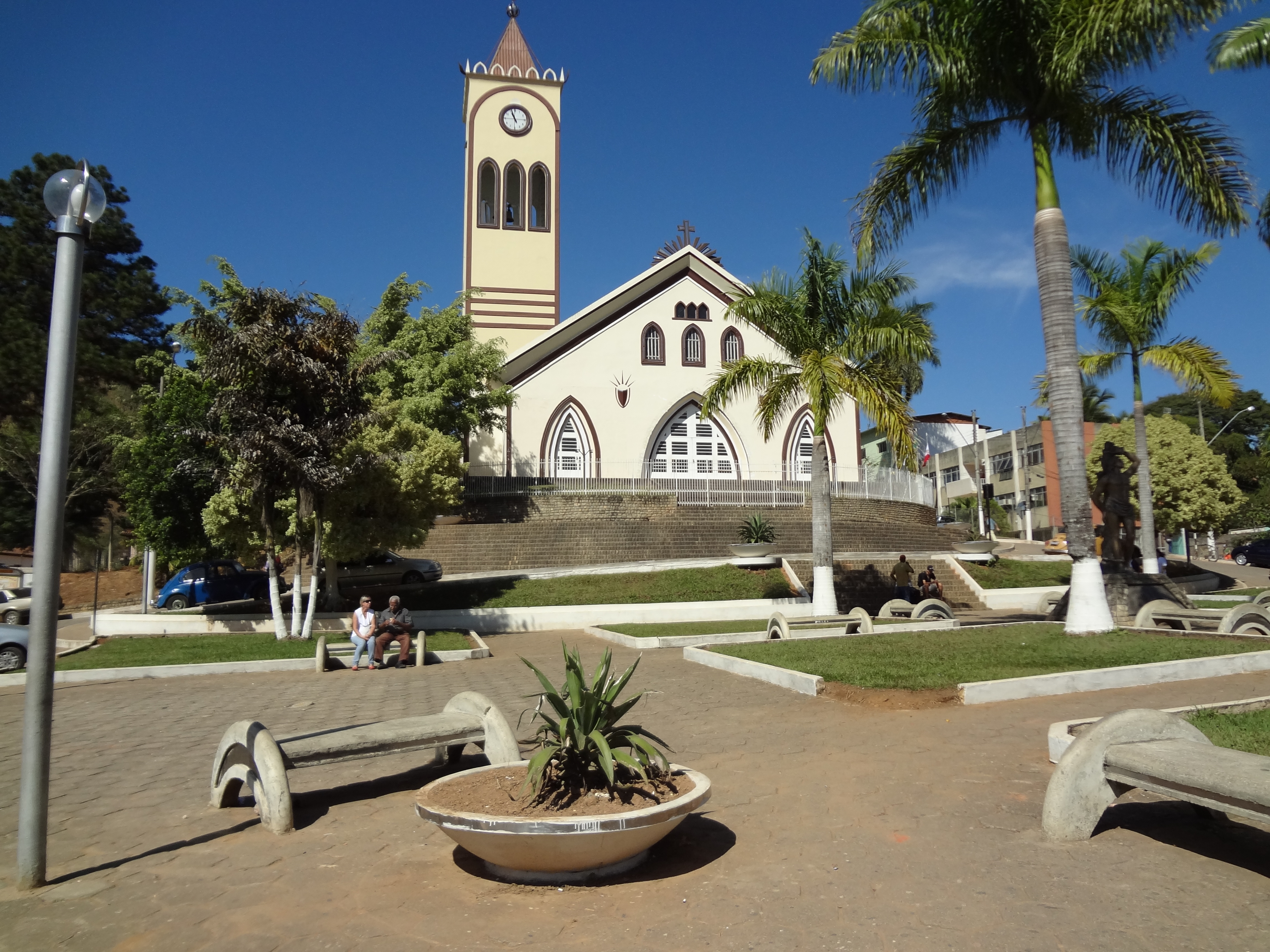

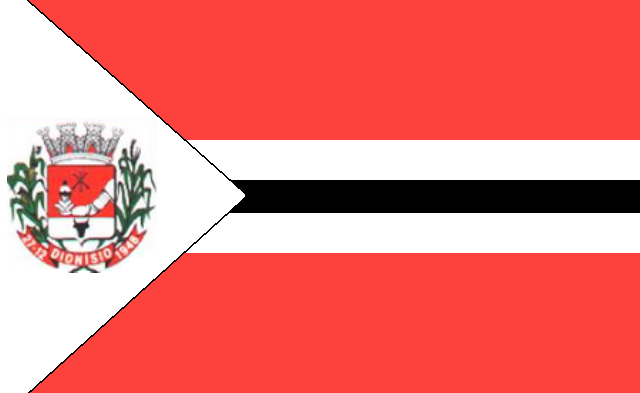
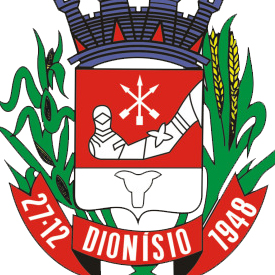
- Flag Coat of arms

- Location in Minas Gerais
- Country: Brazil
- State: Minas Gerais
- Region: Southeast
- Intermediate Region: Ipatinga
- Immediate Region: Ipatinga
- Founded: 27 December 1948

Government
  - Mayor: Francisco Castro Souza Filho (MDB)

Area
  - Total: 339.375 km^{2} (131.033 sq mi)
- Elevation: 376 m (1,234 ft)

Population (2022 Census)
  - Total: 6,847
  - Estimate (2025): 6,689
- Demonym: dionisiano
- Time zone: UTC−3 (BRT)
- Postal Code: 35984-000 to 35985-999
- HDI (2010): 0.702 – high
- Website: dionisio.mg.gov.br

Dionísio is a municipality in the state of Minas Gerais, Brazil. The city belongs to the mesoregion Metropolitana de Belo Horizonte and to the microregion of Itabira. As of 2025, the estimated population was 6,689.

The municipality contains part of the 35,970 hectares (88,900 acres) Rio Doce State Park, created in 1944, the first state-level conservation unit in Minas Gerais.

== Geography ==
=== Climate ===
Climate data for Ponte Alta (Dionísio), elevation 320 m (1,050 ft), (1981–2010)
Month	Jan	Feb	Mar	Apr	May	Jun	Jul	Aug	Sep	Oct	Nov	Dec	Year
Mean daily maximum °C (°F)	31.1 (88.0)	32.1 (89.8)	31.6 (88.9)	30.2 (86.4)	28.3 (82.9)	27.0 (80.6)	27.0 (80.6)	27.5 (81.5)	28.7 (83.7)	30.0 (86.0)	30.6 (87.1)	30.7 (87.3)	29.6 (85.3)
Daily mean °C (°F)	25.3 (77.5)	25.7 (78.3)	25.2 (77.4)	23.9 (75.0)	21.6 (70.9)	19.7 (67.5)	19.5 (67.1)	19.7 (67.5)	21.8 (71.2)	23.5 (74.3)	24.4 (75.9)	24.9 (76.8)	22.9 (73.2)
Mean daily minimum °C (°F)	21.2 (70.2)	21.1 (70.0)	20.8 (69.4)	19.6 (67.3)	16.9 (62.4)	14.5 (58.1)	14.0 (57.2)	13.0 (55.4)	16.6 (61.9)	18.7 (65.7)	19.9 (67.8)	20.8 (69.4)	18.1 (64.6)
Average precipitation mm (inches)	282.4 (11.12)	146.1 (5.75)	126.7 (4.99)	68.9 (2.71)	32.1 (1.26)	8.2 (0.32)	14.2 (0.56)	17.5 (0.69)	35.5 (1.40)	96.2 (3.79)	231.5 (9.11)	274.3 (10.80)	1,333.6 (52.50)
Average precipitation days (≥ 1.0 mm)	13	7	8	5	3	2	2	2	4	6	12	15	79
Average relative humidity (%)	82.2	81.1	82.0	82.5	82.5	81.9	80.2	77.7	76.4	77.0	80.0	82.3	80.5
Source: Instituto Nacional de Meteorologia

== See also ==
- List of municipalities in Minas Gerais
