= Tambopata River =

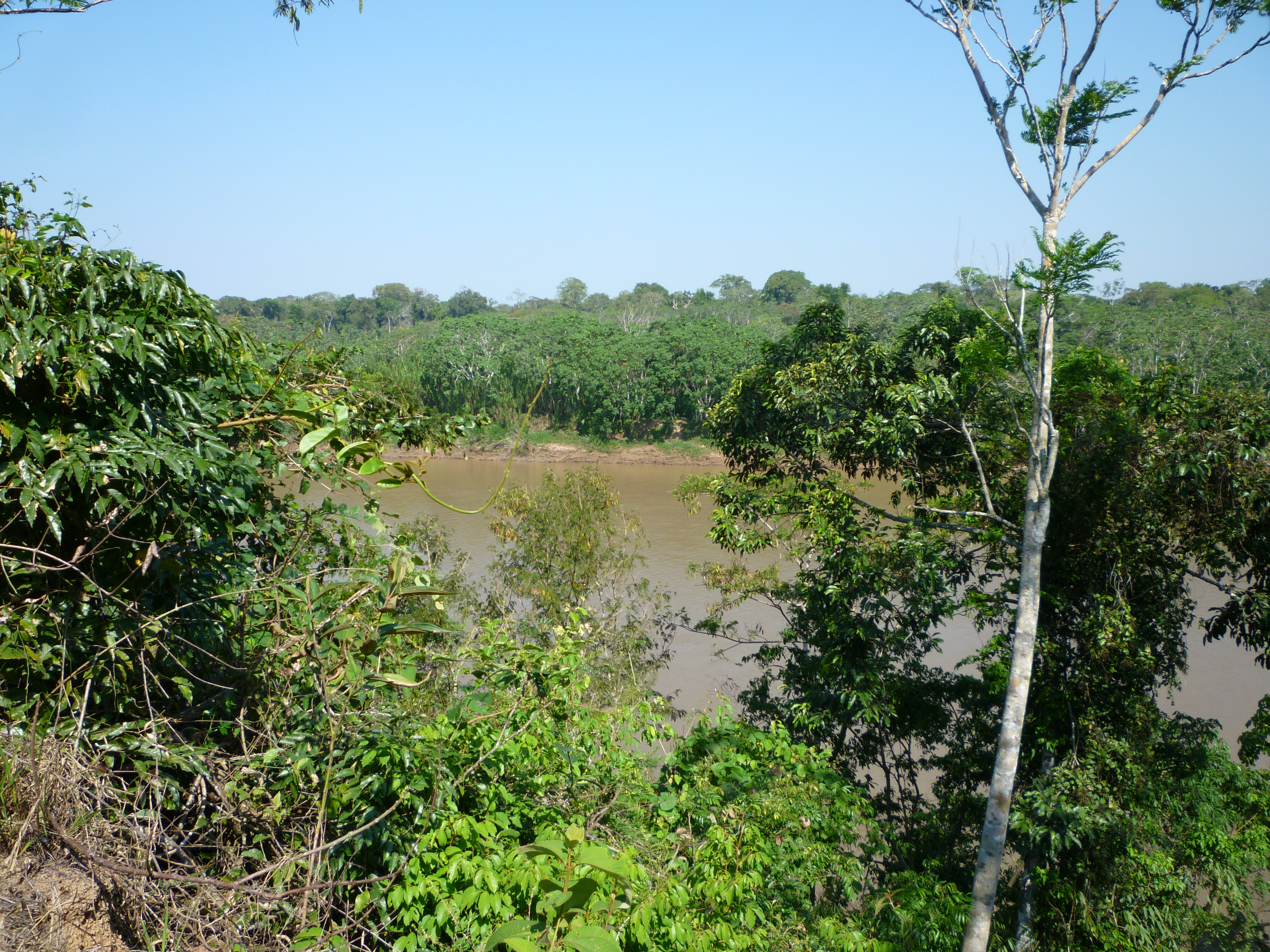
- Tambopata River in the Amazon rainforest in Peru

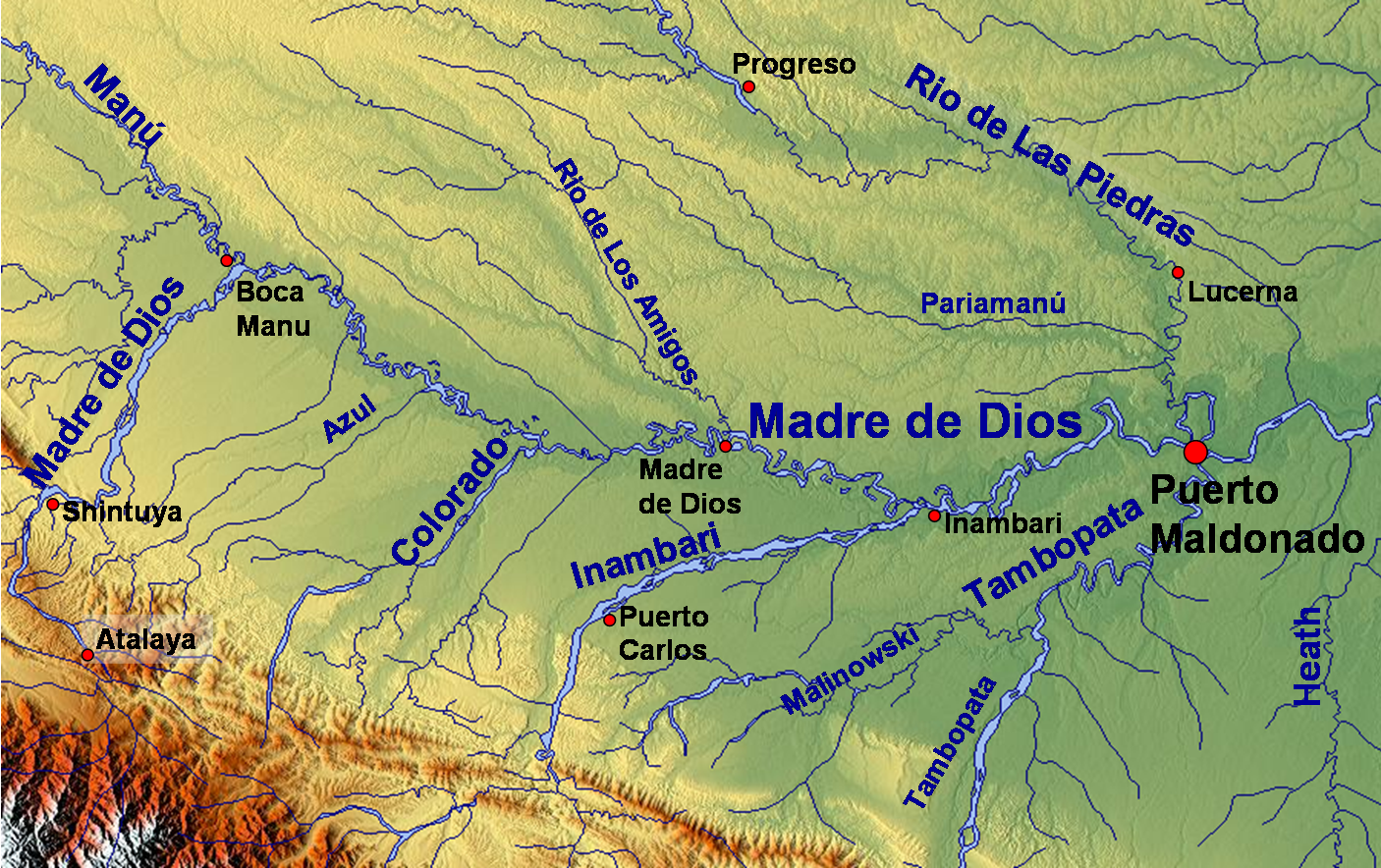
- Madre de Dios watershed with the Tambopata River in the southeast (upper parts of the river not included on the map)

Location
- Country: Bolivia, Peru

Physical characteristics
- Source: Andes
  - location: La Paz Department, Bolivia
- Mouth: Madre de Dios River
  - coordinates: 12°35′48″S 69°10′10″W
- Length: 350 km (220 mi)

The Tambopata River is a river in southeastern Peru and northwestern Bolivia. Most of the Tambopata is in the Madre de Dios and Puno regions in Peru, but the upper parts of the river forms the border between Peru and Bolivia, and its origin is in La Paz department in Bolivia. The Tambopata is a tributary of the Madre de Dios River, into which it merges at the city of Puerto Maldonado. The river flows through the Tambopata National Reserve.

Seven types of flooded forest are recognized for this Reserve:

- Permanently waterlogged swamp forests are former oxbow lakes still flooded but covered in forest.
- Seasonally waterlogged swamp forests are oxbow lakes in the process of filling in.
- Lower floodplain forest are the lowest floodplain locations with a recognizable forest.
- Middle floodplain forests are tall occasionally flooded forests.
- Upper floodplain forests are tall rarely flooded forests.
- Old floodplain forests have been subjected to flooding within the last two hundred years.
- Previous floodplain are now terra firme, but were historically ancient floodplains.

== History ==
Between 1900-1912 during the Amazon rubber boom, companies like the Inca Mining Company, Tambopata Rubber Syndicate and the Inambari Para Rubber Estates Ltd operated on the Tambopata river. These companies were granted concessions by the government of Peru to develop land routes through the isthmus of Fitzcarrald. Like many other rubber extracting enterprises, these companies practiced 'hooking by debts.' Lucien J. Jerome, a British Consul in Callao at the time referred to the treatment of the indigenous in the Madre de Dios as “slavery pure and simple.”

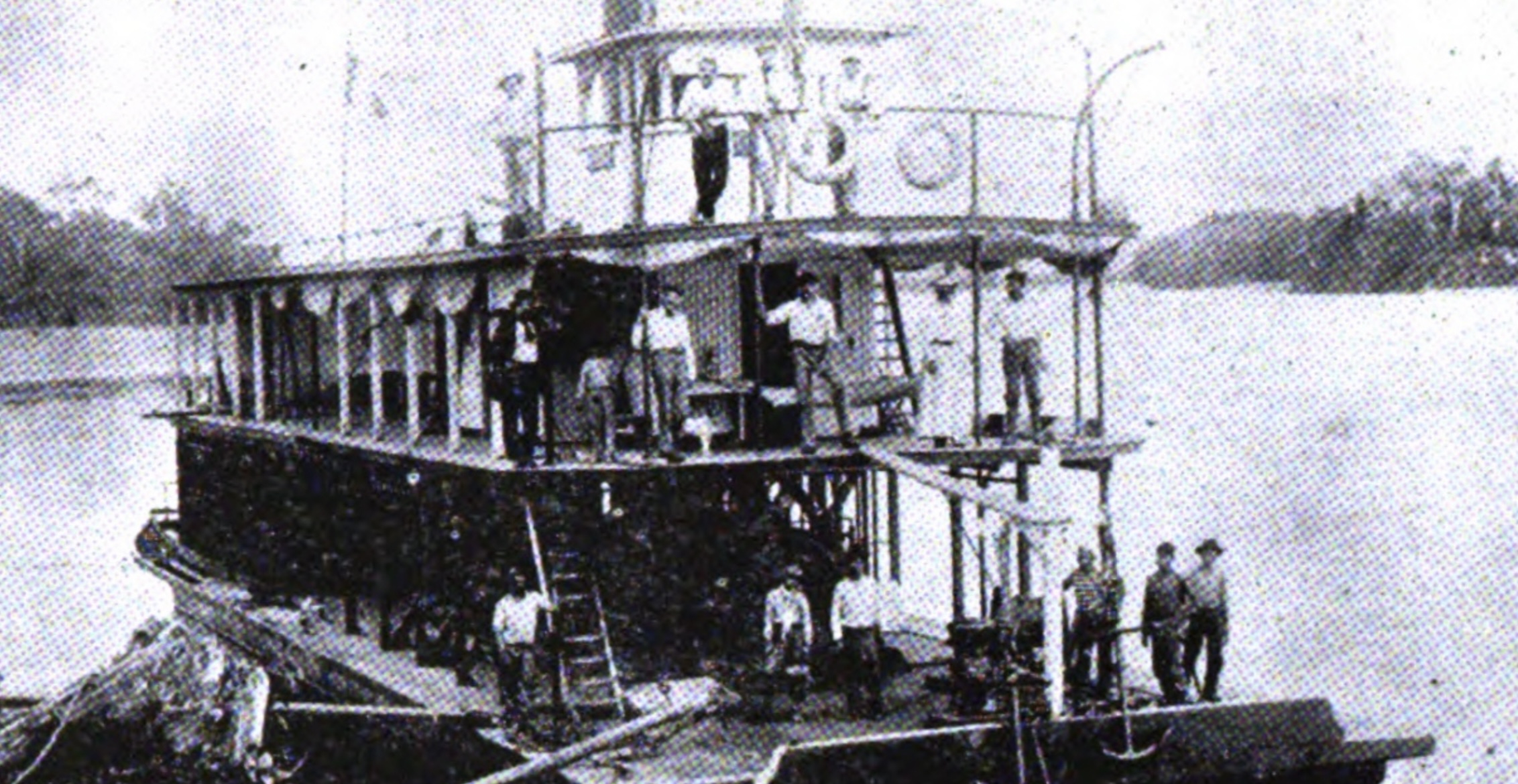
The Inca steamship on the Tambopata River.
