= Piro people =

Piro people may refer to the:

- Mashco-Piro, an uncontacted tribe in Peru
- Piro people, commonly called Yine, an indigenous people in Peru
- Piro people (New Mexico), a former tribe of Puebloans who lived along the Rio Grande River in North America
