= Machinere language =

Arawakan language

Machinere
- Native to: Bolivia, Brazil, Peru
- Ethnicity: 967 Machinere (2012)
- Native speakers: (undated figure of 953)
- Language family: Arawakan: Southern; Piro; Machinere
- Writing system: Latin

Official status
- Official language in: Bolivia

Language codes
- ISO 639-3: mpd
- Glottolog: mach1268
- ELP: Maxineri

The Machinere language is an Arawakan language spoken by over 1,000 of the Machinere people. It is a Piro language and part of the Southern Maipuran language family. The language is highly similar to the Yine language. However, mutual intelligibility is low between the two groups. It is one of the official languages of Bolivia.

== Phonology ==
| | Labial | Alveolar | Postalveolar | Dorsal |
|---|---|---|---|---|
| Plosive | p | t | | k |
| Affricate | | t͡s | t͡ʃ | c͡ç |
| Fricative | | s | ʃ | x |
| Sonant | w | r | | j |
| Nasal | m | n | | |

| | Front | Central | Back |
|---|---|---|---|
| Close | i | ɨ | o |
| Open | e | a | |

== Orthography ==
It is written in the Latin script. The Bible was translated in Machinere in 1960.
