= Mashco language =

Mashco may refer to the following languages:

- Amarakaeri language
- Mashco Piro language
- Yine language

There is also an unclassified language of Peru by this name
