= Piro language =

Piro may refer to:

- Piro languages, Arawakan languages of the Peruvian and western Brazilian Amazon
- Piro language (Peru), a Maipurean language
- Piro Pueblo language, a poorly attested, extinct Tanoan language of New Mexico
