= Carlos Scharff =

Peruvian rubber baron (1866–1909)

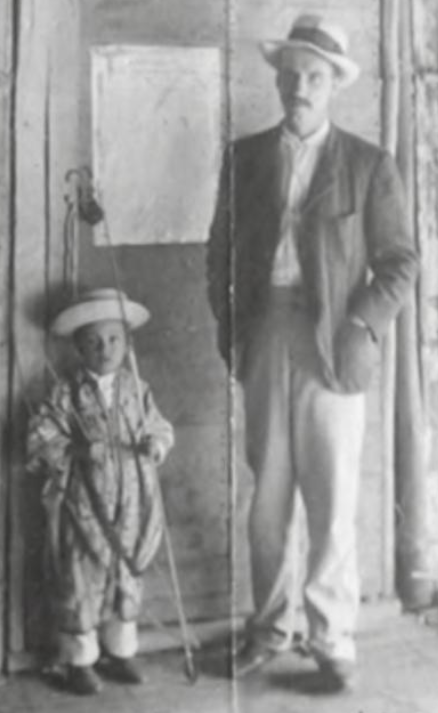
- Scharff (right) in 1905
- Born: Carlos Scharff; 30 October 1866; Chachapoyas, Peru
- Died: 28 July 1909 (aged 42); Las Piedras, Peru
- Cause of death: Killed in mutiny
- Occupation: Rubber baron

Carlos Scharff (30 October 1866 – 28 July 1909) was a Peruvian rubber baron who was active along the Upper Purus and Las Piedras rivers during the Amazon rubber boom in Peru. He also served for many years during his youth as an agent for the Belgian consulate in Brazil.

Between 1897 and 1909, Scharff enslaved and exploited indigenous peoples in the territory he controlled, primarily for the purpose of increasing rubber extraction for his firm. He was responsible for the displacement of numerous indigenous populations, forcing them to migrate along with his enterprise when the latter would relocate. These populations include tribes of Piro, Amahuaca, Machiguenga, Asháninka, Conibo, Yine, and Yaminawá people.

Scharff was heavily involved in a border conflict between Peru and Brazil in 1903–1904, which he had a role in instigating. Brazilian journalist Euclides da Cunha referred to Scharff as the "great land lord" of the Upper Purus, where many rubber exporters were dependent on him by 1905.

The Geographic Society of Lima credits Scharff with the establishment of a portage route around 1905, that connected the Upper Purus to the Madre de Dios River. Along this section of the Purus, he facilitated the exploitation of rubber sources, as well as a general increase of commercial movement along the course of the river. Scharff was killed in 1909, after a mutiny by his workforce near the Piedras River. The India Rubber World reported that at the time of his death, Scharff was $3,000,000 in debt. Anthropologist William Curtis Farabee referred to him as "the most notorious of all rubber gatherers in the Upper Amazon region."

== Early life ==
Scharff was born on 30 October 1866 in Chachapoyas, Peru, where he received a good education. His parents had immigrated to South America from Germany. According to anthropologist Peter Gow, Scharff received a significant portion of his education in Brazil. In 1882, Scharff entered a business relationship with brothers Carl and Paul Hoepcke, who had formed the firm "Carl Hoepcke e Cia." The company was originally an import–export agency operating out of Desterro, Santa Catharina, in Brazil. Scharff joined the company as a co-manager and limited partner. At some point during the 1880s, Scharff became an agent for the Belgian consulate at Desterro. An 1884 issue of A Regeneração contains an advertisement written by Scharff regarding a ship that had been listed for sale by the Belgian consulate. The advertisement also states that he was in charge of the consulate. An almanac published by Barbosa Pinto in 1888 also lists Scharff as the agent in charge of the Belgian consulate at Desterro. At the end of 1890, Scharff resigned from his position at Carl Hoepcke e Cia, and sold his share in the company. A document published by Relatórios do Itamaraty contains a list of consulate agents working within Brazil: Scharff appears on the list, with a listed residency in Lübeck, the document also states he was nominated to the position of vice-consul on 8 August 1896. This appears to have been Scharff's last appointment with the consulate.

== Rubber baron ==
Scharff was primarily active along the Jurua, Purus and later the Las Piedras Rivers and their tributaries during the rubber boom. (Note: According to the Sociedad Geográfica de Lima, Scharff worked along the Tigre, Tamishaco, Napo, Yavari, Yaquirana, Morona, and Putumayo River, as well as its tributaries, however there are no corroborating sources for this information.) During Scharff's stint in the Amazon, he enslaved and exploited various indigenous populations. Some of these populations include various Yine, Matsigenka, Cushitineri, Etene, Kudpaneri, Nachineri, Amahuaca, Ronohuo, Yaminahua, Asháninka, Conibo, Huitoto, and Mashco-Piro peoples. (Note: The Huitoto population likely migrated along with other caucheros that were previously working within the Putumayo region, more than a thousand miles away and took place during the Putumayo genocide.) At one point, Scharff's enterprise was valued at £1,200,000 and at that time he was exporting rubber to Paris, London, New York, as well as towards Iquitos and Manaus. According to Sociedad Geográfica de Lima, Scharff controlled such a large portion of the Upper Purus basin that it would take twenty days of travel by canoe through portage routes to get from his post in Hosanna to his station at Alerta.

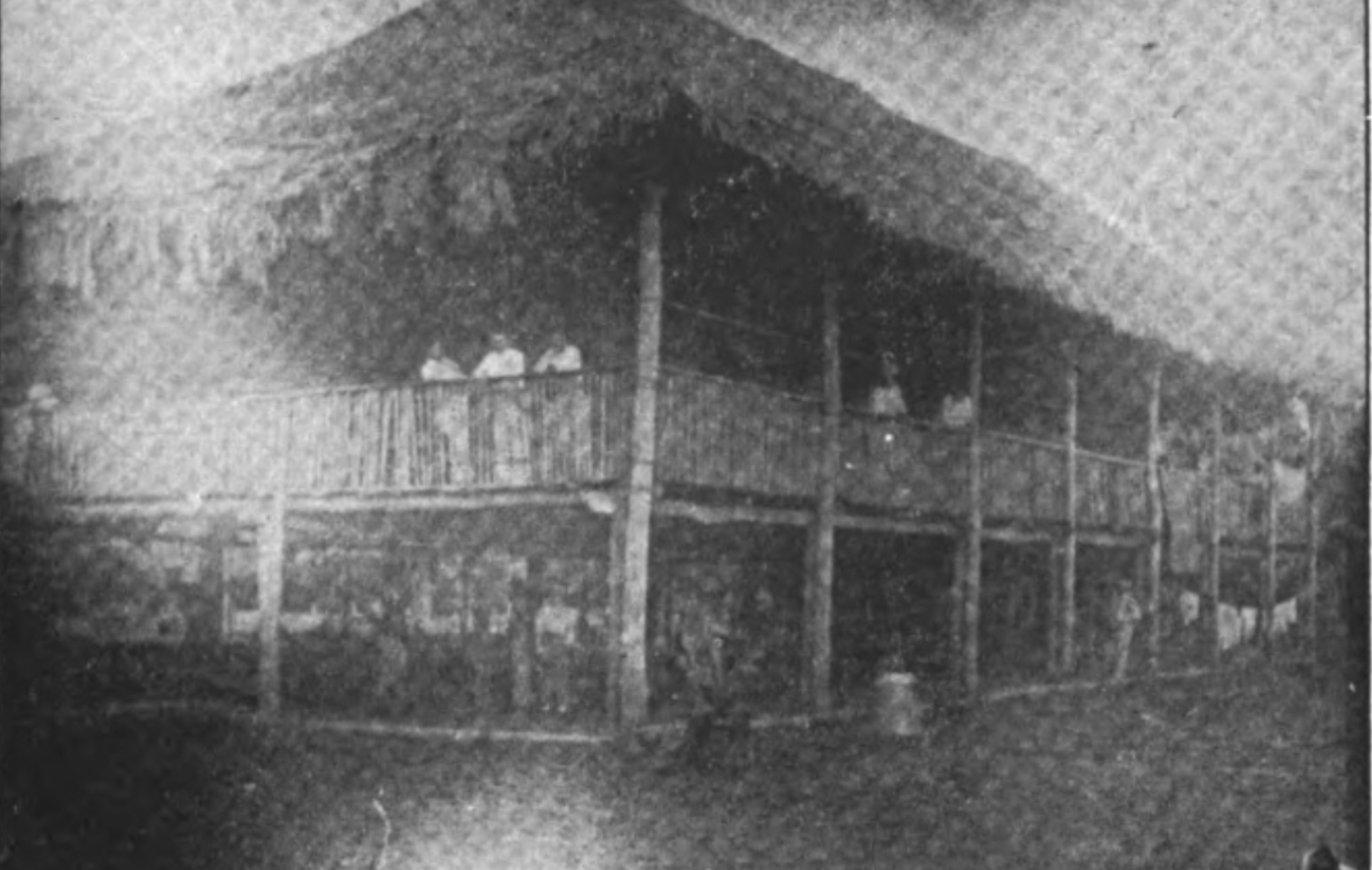
House at Sepahua

In a 2006 article titled "'Purús Song': Nationalization and Tribalization in Southwestern Amazonia", Gow refuted the claims that the Isthmus of Fitzcarrald, as well as the portage route between the Sepahua and Cujar tributaries, were discovered in the 19th century. (Note: The Sepahua River is located in the Urubamba valley, while the Cujar River is located within the Purús valley. The claim over who established this portage route, is disputed between Delfin Fitzcarrald and Leopoldo Collazos.) Gow states that "These were standard routes used by Piro people moving between river systems, and are regularly mentioned in the earlier literature ... What the 'discoveries' related in the histories actually relate is the increasingly direct articulation of this trading system with the burgeoning rubber extraction industry in the latter half of the nineteenth century." This information also disputes Scharff's discovery of the portage route along the Las Piedras River, which connected the Purus River to the Madre de Dios River. (Note: The portage point between the Sepahua and the Purus River linked the Urubamba River valley to the Purus River valley. While the portage point along the Las Piedras River linked the Purus River valley to the Madre de Dios River.) Like other rubber barons, Scharff implemented his indigenous workforce to clear paths through the forest to create better transportation routes between his rubber stations and along the portage routes. This workforce was also forced to migrate with Scharff's enterprise periodically due to the nature of rubber extraction in the Upper Amazon.

=== In the Upper Amazon ===
==== 1897–1901: Emergence in the rubber boom ====
Scharff first appeared within the historical context of the rubber boom during a period of time when portage routes were being developed along the Isthmus of Fitzcarrald. The portage routes in this region would help facilitate travel from the Ucayali River basin towards the Madre de Dios. Later routes developed by Scharff and his business partners would establish movement for Peruvian rubber tappers in the Purus River. While not much is known about Scharff's business relationship with the Fitzcarralds, later sources refer to Scharff as a foreman working for Carlos Fermín Fitzcarrald. After the death of Carlos Fitzcarrald in a river accident on the Urubamba River in 1897, his brother Delfin Fitzcarrald, along with Leopoldo Collazos and Scharff, assumed responsibility over a large portion of the enterprise. Over time, Scharff became one of the most powerful entrepreneurs on the Ucayali, Urubamba Rivers and their tributaries.

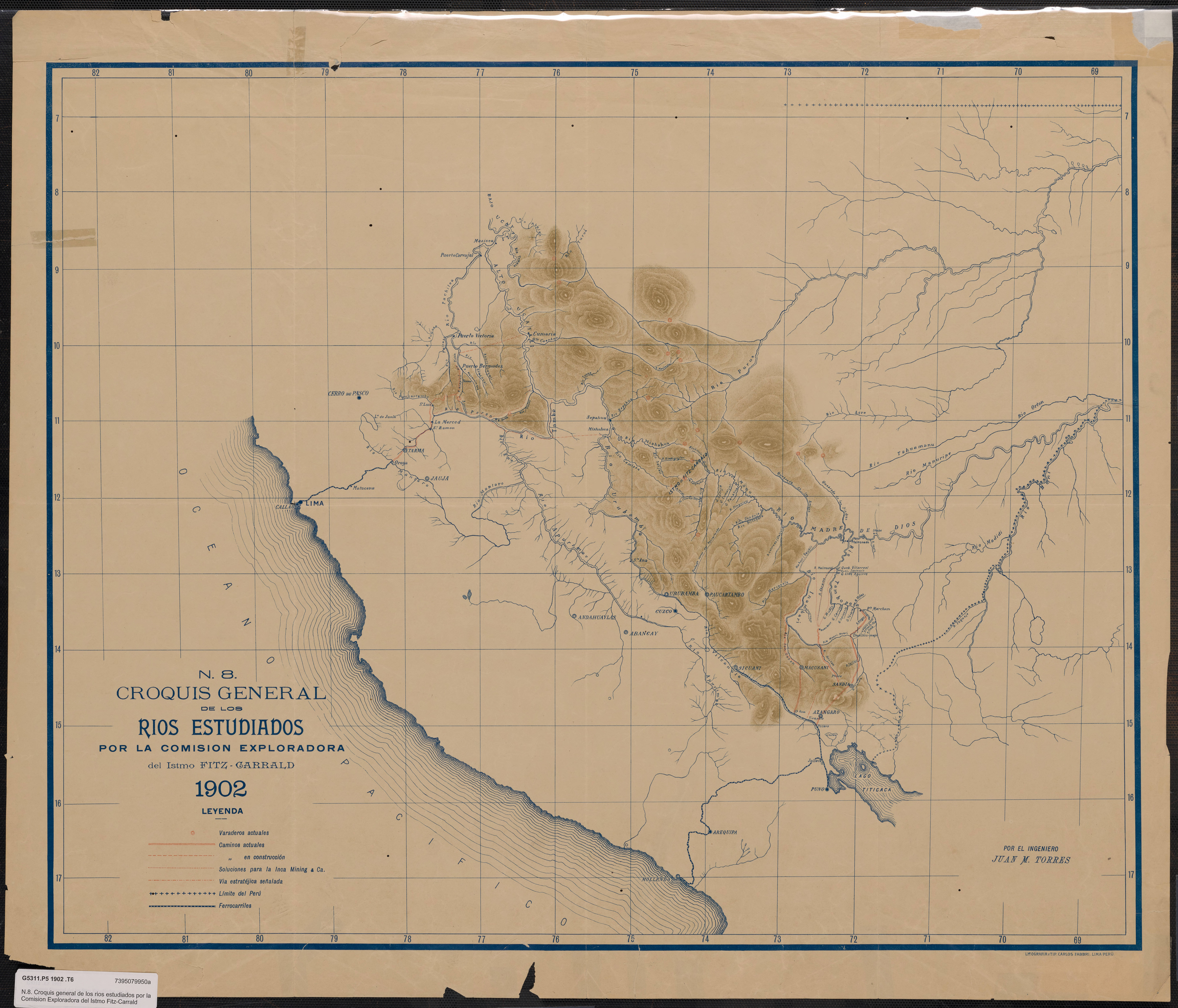
Map by the Fitz-Carrald Isthmus Exploratory Commission, circa 1902.

Another figure working with Scharff and the Fitzcarralds was Asháninka indigenous chief Venancio Amaringo Campa. (Note: Amaringo began working with Carlos Fitzcarrald as early as 1893, and provided labor for Fitzcarrald's enterprise through enslaving indigenous populations. At the time, these were usually Ashaninka natives.) Amaringo along with his group of men helped to catch and enslave other native populations that would be used as a workforce to extract rubber. Amaringo also organized "punitive expeditions" against other caucheros (Note: The word cauchero may translate to "gatherer of wild caucho" and caucho is a term used for latex from Castilla elastica trees. Euclides Da Cunha provides a character analysis for an archytype of the cauchero in his Portuguese essay, "Os Caucheros".) which Fitzcarrald had conflict or disagreements. After the river accident in 1897, Amaringo continued to provide his services to Collazos and Scharff. Amaringo managed a settlement named Washington where a group of around five hundred enslaved natives lived along the Unini River, a tributary of the Ucayali. During the dry season this group of natives was forced to migrate so that they could work for rubber barons like Scharff. When Amaringo was working with Scharff in 1901, he was apparently under the control of around one hundred indigenous families. According to Susanna B. Hecht, Scharff extensively implemented a "tribute model" across his estate and appeared to depend on discipline maintained by powerful chiefs in order to keep his workforce compliant. Amaringo is an example of one of these powerful chiefs. Hecht also noted that "Scharff used the Peruvian military based in Iquitos to mediate his local quarrels, rather than the bands of thugs that more powerful river masters typically commanded."

The organization between Delfin, Collazos and Scharff initiated a series of migrations beginning in 1899 with the intention of establishing new rubber stations along the Purus River. Migrations towards the Madre de Dios region were reported as early as 1901 – hundreds of Ashaninka, Piro, and Amahuaca natives were a part of these migrations. Leopoldo Bernucci estimates that there were approximately five hundred indigenous families migrated by Scharff. According to Gow, "many Piro people moved from the Urubamba to the Purús [and Yurua] as debt slaves of rubber bosses like Scharff who were seeking to exploit the rich stands of the rubber-producing caucho of the latter river." Hecht writes that the decision to relocate was also partially influenced from the pressure induced by slave raids in the region, perpetrated by other Peruvian caucheros like Julio César Arana. These migrations were also encouraged by the recent development of portage routes that connected the Sepahua tributary to either the Purus or Jurua river valley.

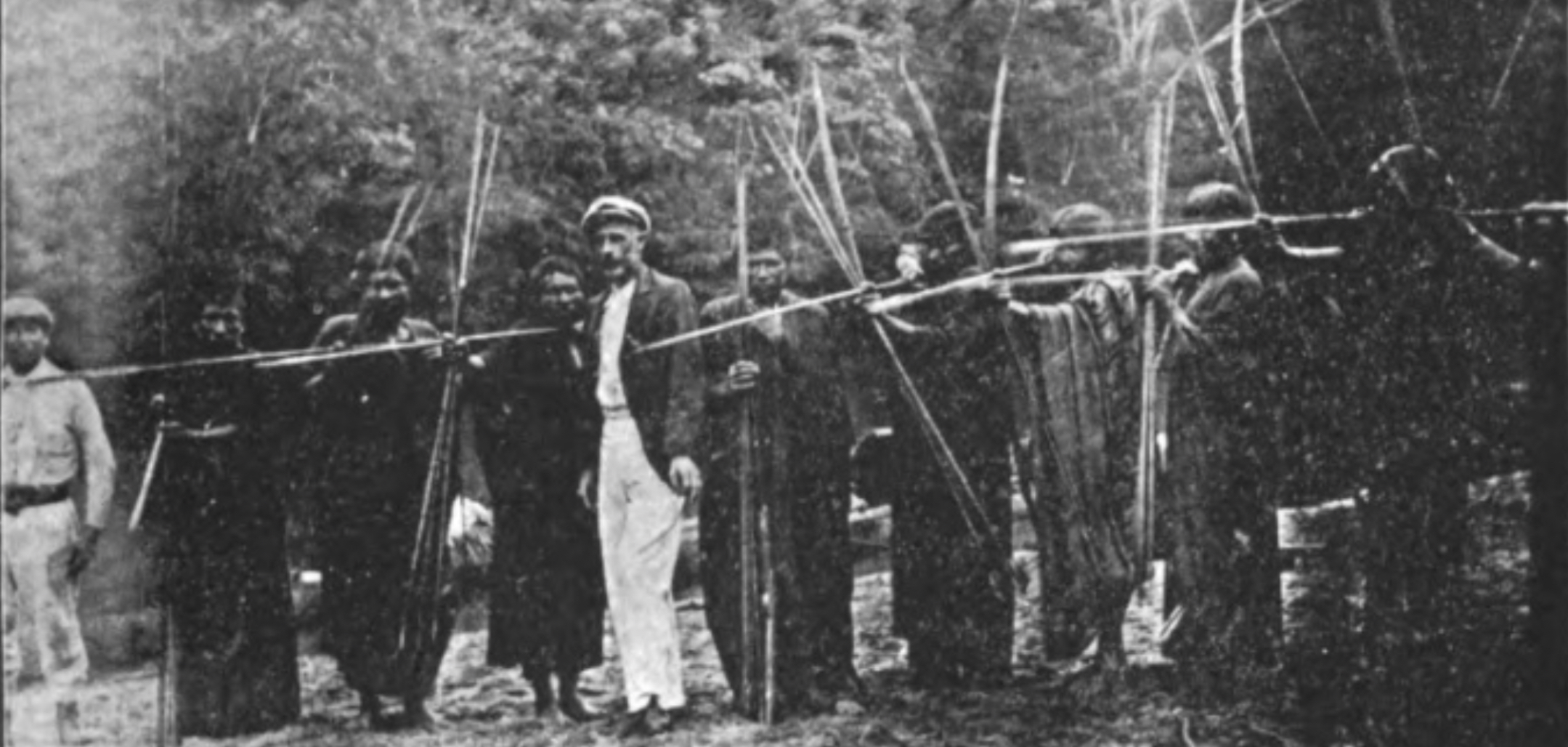
“The boss of the expedition and his Piros”, photograph published by the Junta de Vias Fluviales in 1901.

Scharff managed rubber stations along the Gregorio and Liberdade tributaries for over two years with the help of around three hundred other caucheros. Scharff's network began to withdraw from the Gregorio at the end of 1900, and temporarily established operations along the Envira River. The Peruvians continued to carry out correrias (Note: The word correria translates into "chasings" and refers to the slave raids launched by caucheros against native populations.) against the indigenous population along the Envira River after Scharff had left the area. These Peruvians were enabled by the firm Lecca & Penna and Scharff's company. Years later, a newspaper from Manaus named O Paiz published an article containing a report from Brazilian colonel José Ferreira de Araújo, which stated Scharff and his caucheros were responsible for killing "thousands of indigenous people" along the Jaminauá and Paranã do Ouro tributaries of the Upper Envira River. O Paiz also claimed that Scharff and his caucheros were responsible for massacring nearly four hundred natives during slave raids on the Gregorio River. A Brazilian engineer later published information that stated this group of natives had the name "Ajubins" and they were located on the Gregorio River.

After the death of Delfin Fitzcarrald, an internal conflict started within his business network, especially between Scharff and José Cardoso da Rosa. Cardoso was the foreman and the stepfather of Fitzcarrald's widow, Aurora Velazco. There was suspicion from Cardoso towards Leopoldo Collazos regarding Delfin's death. Delfin was apparently killed by Amahuaca Natives when he was returning with Collazos from his first trip to the Purus River, (Note: Dole stated that the trip where Delfin died, was the same incident where caucheros tried to take a young indigenous girl as they were going to leave. This angered the natives, who attacked and killed many of the caucheros on the expedition. Somehow, Collazos managed to survive the incident and return from the expedition. According to the information Dole has, Collazos and his remaining group had to walk for 18 days before they found help. Dole states that "after this treacherous attack the Amahuaca of the region did not allow the white men to approach their villages.") (Note: The Sociedad Geografica de Lima states that the expedition was exploring along the Curanja River.) and his death allowed Collazos and Scharff to assume effective control over that river. The Sociedad de Geografica de Lima provides two different accounts regarding who attacked Delfin Fitzcarrald's expedition: one says that he was killed by Yaminaguas natives, while the other states that "civilized people" disguised as natives carried out the ambush. According to Ernesto Reyna, the native population was harshly punished as a result of Delfin's death.

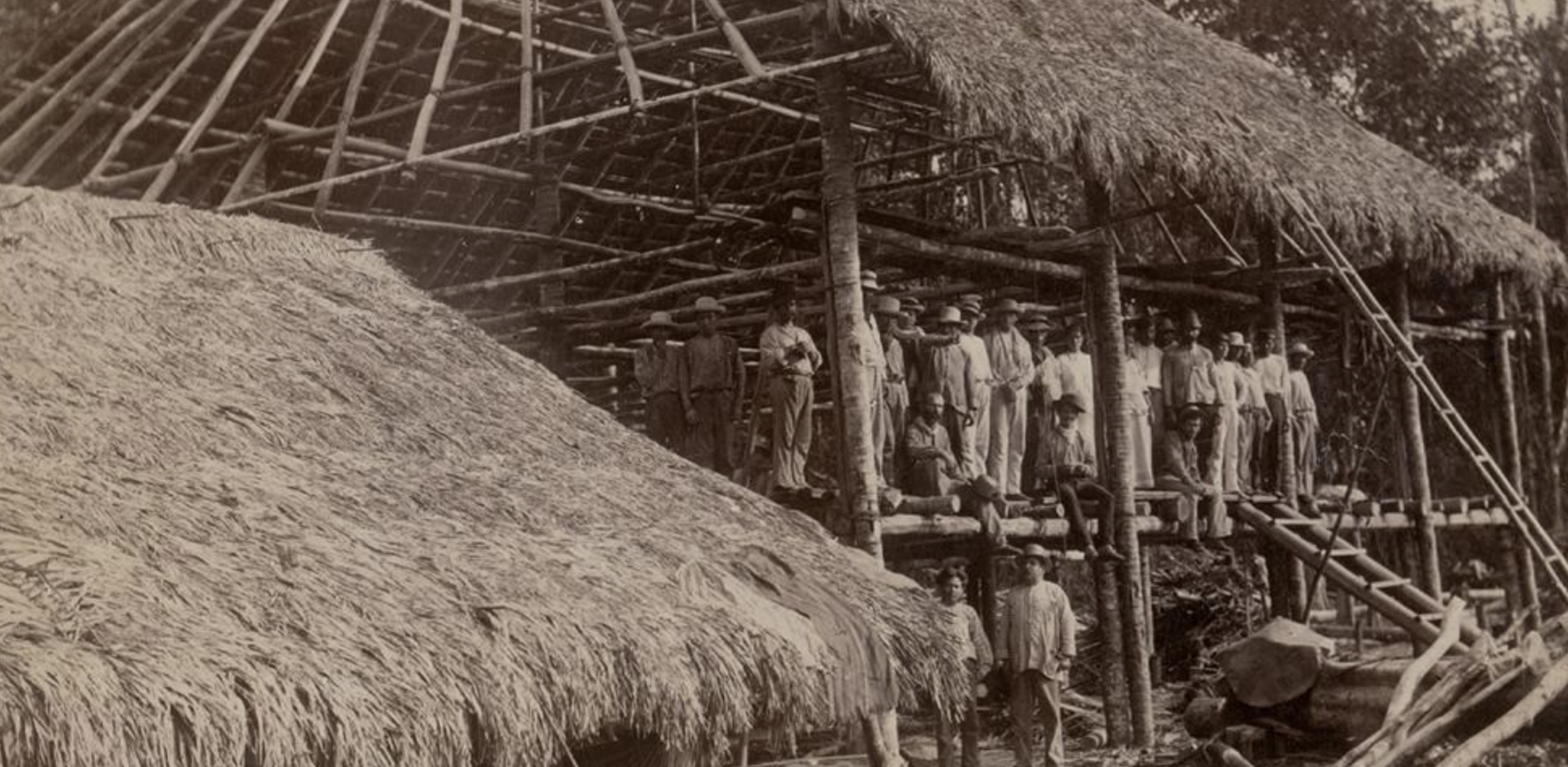
A rubber station being constructed in the Upper Amazon valley

Another issue was that Cardoso believed that a portion of the rubber produced by Scharff belonged to his family, since the enterprise was financed by his stepdaughter's money. However, Scharff treated the rubber as his own product, he was attempting to sell his rubber in Manaus, rather than shipping it to Sepahua and therefore Iquitos. Disagreements about the rubber profits would later escalate into a larger conflict between Peru and Brazil. By the time Carlos had left the Gregorio and Envira Rivers, he had accumulated massive debts with Cardoso and Aurora, although he disputed responsibility for the payment. Scharff also left behind a trail of violence along the indigenous inhabited areas, financing slave raids. The first armed clashes of this conflict were attributed to the accumulated debts Aurora and Cardoso believed they were owed from Scharff. (Note: Hecht attributes the conflict to debts accumulated by Scharff to local Brazilians.) When the Piro natives inquired about who had initially started the fighting on the Purus River, the answer was disputed between "Scharff or Cardoso da Rosa to 'the Peruvians' or 'the Brazilians'".

==== 1901–1904: Border conflict with Brazil ====
At the time of Delfin Fitzcarrald's death, Scharff was operating a rubber camp on the Upper Purus River, near the confluence of the Curiuja and Cujar tributaries, although several sources state that the settlement on this confluence was named the "Alerta" station. By 1901, Carlos Scharff had migrated hundreds of natives from the Ucayali and Jurua Rivers and settled them around the Upper Purus River basin. Scharff established a network along the Purus River, in particular along the Chandless tributary, and was managing twelve different rubber stations with a workforce of around 2,000 men. (Note: Peruvians were able to travel between the Ucayali and Upper Madre de Dios basins to the Upper Purus and Jurua River basins by using routes along the mouth of the Chandless River.) (Note: The Sociedad Geográfica de Lima stated that at one point Scharff controlled a workforce of around 2,000 debt peons and "caucheros" that managed entire tribes of Campas, Conibos, Chamas, Huitotos and Piro natives in the rubber collection process. Piedrafita Iglesias states that these 2,000 men were caucheros. The other source which gives the figure for Scharff's work force consisting of 2,000 men, does not specify if the indigenous rubber tappers are included in that number, or if this figure consists of only the men who oversaw the enslaved indigenous workforce.) He effectively ruled the Upper Purus region and its tributaries as the governor of the basin. Scharff was also carrying out slave raids along the Curanja and Yacu tributaries according to a publication named O Amazonas. (Note: The source gives the tributary the name Yacu, this may be the Curiyacu.)

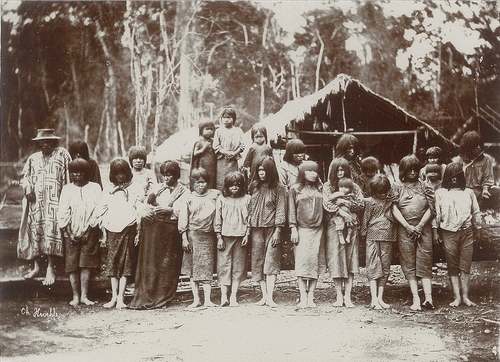
A group of Piro people in the Upper Amazon

Around this time, Scharff began to send groups of Ashaninka mercenaries to "hook" the local Ronohuo natives – however, the majority of the Ronohuo resisted this entrapment. (Note: The word "hook" is used in relation to the "hooking by debts" practice, which was a method caucheros used to entice natives to extract rubber without violence.) (Note: The Ronohuo were one of the populations that made up the Amahuaca demographic.) In retaliation, Scharff initiated correrias against these natives, and many of them were either captured or killed. The Amahuaca retaliated against these incursions and occasionally attacked the cauchero camps, where "they killed their white patrons, their families and their indigenous peons, and took away their firearms and any other manufactured object that was within their reach." The Peruvian government would later send a garrison to establish a military force in the area, partially due to these indigenous attacks. This garrison was implemented by Scharff's business partner, Collazos, to assist in the conquering of more territory along the Upper Purus. According to Amahuaca oral tradition, these Peruvian soldiers along with Asháninka mercenaries, were responsible for many Amahuaca deaths in the Upper Purus area. The Ronohuo, which was part of the Amahuaca demographic, were apparently once a "very numerous" tribe, however their numbers were greatly reduced by 1905.

After requesting help from Iquitos, a detachment of twenty soldiers and two Peruvian sergeants arrived on 23 June 1903, to the Scharff territory on the Chandless River. The detachment was led by police chief Jorge Barreto, and upon their arrival, the construction of a new customs house began. The establishment of the garrison and the customs house further escalated the conflict between Peru and Brazil. (Note: According to Hecht, Brazil had "closed the Upper Amazon to trade, especially munitions destined for Peru," and two steamships that were filled with ammunition and weapons were seized by Brazilian authorities around that time. It is possible that these two steamboats were the Acreana and Mercedes ships, which would later be used in the conflict.)

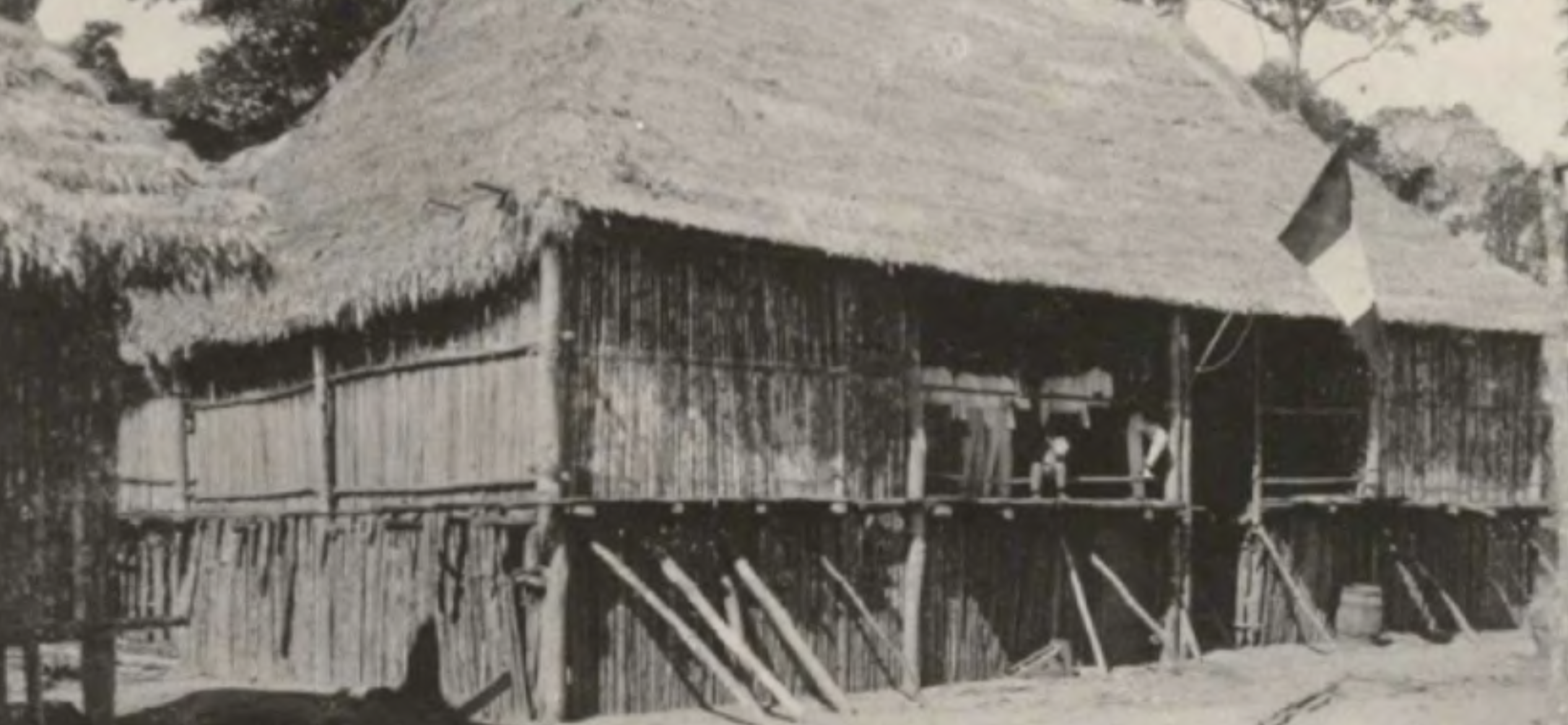
Peruvian rubber station in the Upper Amazon

A group of around two hundred armed Brazilians had arrived in the area on 25 September 1903, with the intention of kicking Scharff and the other Peruvians out of the region. The Brazilians managed to surround the local Peruvian garrison, and after a two-day siege attempted to persuade them to surrender. Only Captain Barreto managed to escape from the Peruvian side, while the rest of the garrison was killed. This group of Brazilians later arrested Scharff after a skirmish at his "Union" camp along the Chandless River, which was subsequently sacked. Bartolomé Zumaeta, brother-in-law of the Peruvian rubber baron Julio César Arana, was also arrested along with Scharff. Around fifteen members of the local Peruvian army garrison were killed during the skirmish. There was a guerrilla war waged throughout the region, which brought about the destruction of rubber stations, outposts that collect firewood, and domiciles in the area. (Note: The conflict also instigated crimes within the area such as rape, torture and murder against the inhabitants of the opposing side's rubber stations.) A number of Scharff's stations and warehouses were looted, and then burned down as well.

Scharff was later freed in Manaus, from which he travelled to Iquitos to protest the situation. The government of Loreto sent police captain Lopez Saavedra along with 30 soldiers to the region to expel the Brazilians. Saavedra was supposed to join his forces with the local "200 rubber bosses and their workers" in Curanja. (Note: Euclides da Cunha estimated that by 1903 there were around a thousand caucheros operating on the Curanja tributary. This population appears to have diminished after the border conflict with Brazil, to around one hundred and fifty.) However, there was a dispute over the group's leadership: the rubber bosses insisted on having Scharff as their leader instead of Saavedra. Saavedra refused this and most of the group dispersed, so he was left with only sixty-seven men that he distributed along the banks of a river at Santa Rosa. A group of 270 Brazilians arrived in the area on 30 March 1904, using the boats Acreana and Mercedes: stolen respectively from Julio César Arana and Scharff. In the words of Susanna B. Hecht, "The battle was on, and depending on the nationality of one's source, it was a triumph either for Brazil or for Peru." The Brazilians were able to take the right bank prisoner. While the Peruvians on the left bank fought back, and managed to kill fifty-eight of their attackers before the Brazilians withdrew for the day. Shortly after the skirmish the Peruvians decided to abandon their positions. The Brazilians continued to occupy the area for the next ten months, before a modus vivendi was signed between their country and Peru.

Scharff had an ambiguous role in the Peruvian Scramble. He makes appearances as a backwoodsman in the remoter tributaries of the Upper Amazon, but he seems in many ways to have been an agent provocateur mobilized to bring attention to Peruvian presence in the region, to manufacture conflict, and to draw in the military from Iquitos into the Purus. Whether this was just his character or an assigned charge is not known, but he was a consistently a point man on the Peruvian side, apparently able to command military backup whenever he needed it. Scharff liked to display a diploma that named him the governor of the Upper Purus, incited local Peruvians not to pay the customs fees to Brazilian officials, and embarked on vicious correrias-hunts of native peoples.

— Susanna B. Hecht, The Scramble for the Amazon and the "Lost Paradise" of Euclides da Cunha

==== 1904–1905: At Curanja ====
There was a notable decline in the Peruvian presence in the Upper Purus area after the border conflict with Brazil. A 1904 census found that there was a population of 10,852 inhabitants distributed throughout 150 rubber barracas (Note: The word barraca is a Spanish term that refers to the rubber stations in the Amazon during the rubber boom.) along the Upper Purus. (Note: The year before, there was an estimate of around one thousand caucheros along the Curanja River, where Scharff's business was centered at the time.) Out of this group there were only four hundred Peruvians documented as working in the Upper Purus area. Scharff's enterprise suffered significant loses due to the conflict and filed a reimbursement claim to the government of Brazil for £200,000 in damages.

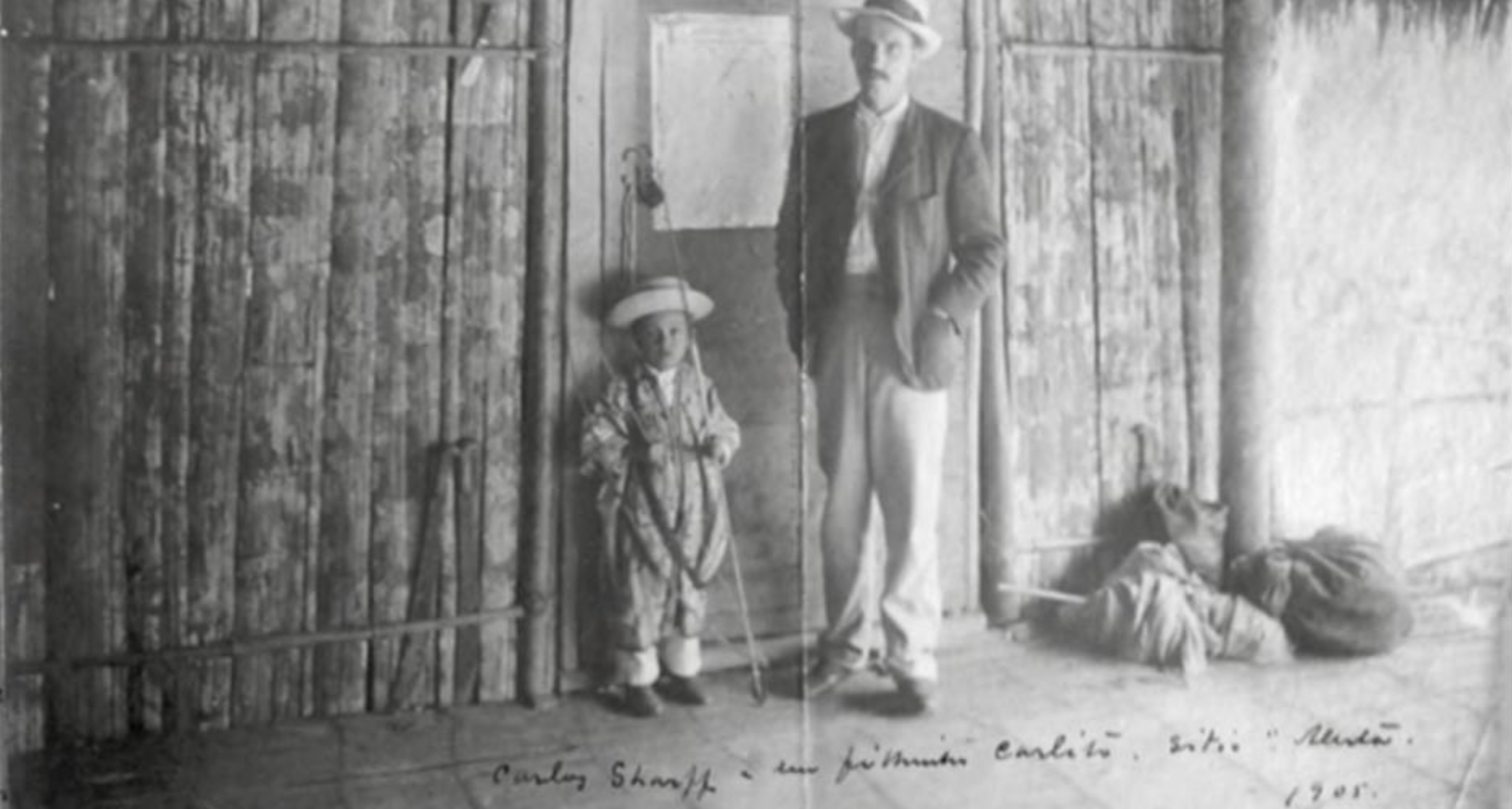
"Carlos Scharff and his little son Carlito" (1905)

The joint Peruvian–Brazilian commission to determine the regional border travelled through Scharff's territory in 1905. At the time, Scharff was still operating from his rubber stations settled at the confluence of the Cujar and Curiuja tributaries, which was named Alerta. Da Cunha accompanied the commission, and provided information on the area and Scharff's enterprise. He noted that Alerta was "the most advantageous post" in the southern direction of the Curanja River. There was a German bookkeeper named A. Scharff managing the commercial house at Alerta, although his full name and relation to Carlos Scharff is not documented. Da Cunha mentioned that there were 400 men subordinate to Scharff at Alerta, most of whom were Amahuaca and Ashaninka natives. The crops of the settlement were planted by the Amahuaca women, and Da Cunha noted that these plants were limited to "yucas and canes".

The Asháninka chief Venancio Amaringo had migrated from the Ucayali basin to the Upper Peru's region sometime around 1904, and Da Cunha mentioned that he was operating a large plantation named Tingoleales, which produced bananas and cotton. More than one hundred men had followed Amaringo to the region, where he continued to work with Scharff and other rubber barons. According to Euclides, Scharff's business moved so frequently because the rubber trees in this part of the Amazon could not support long term exploitation. Because of this, "the cauchero [was] forced to be a nomad devoted to combat, destruction and a wandering or riotous life". Instead of tapping a rubber tree which was a standard method of long term harvesting, the trees in this region were cut down and all of its latex was harvested at once.

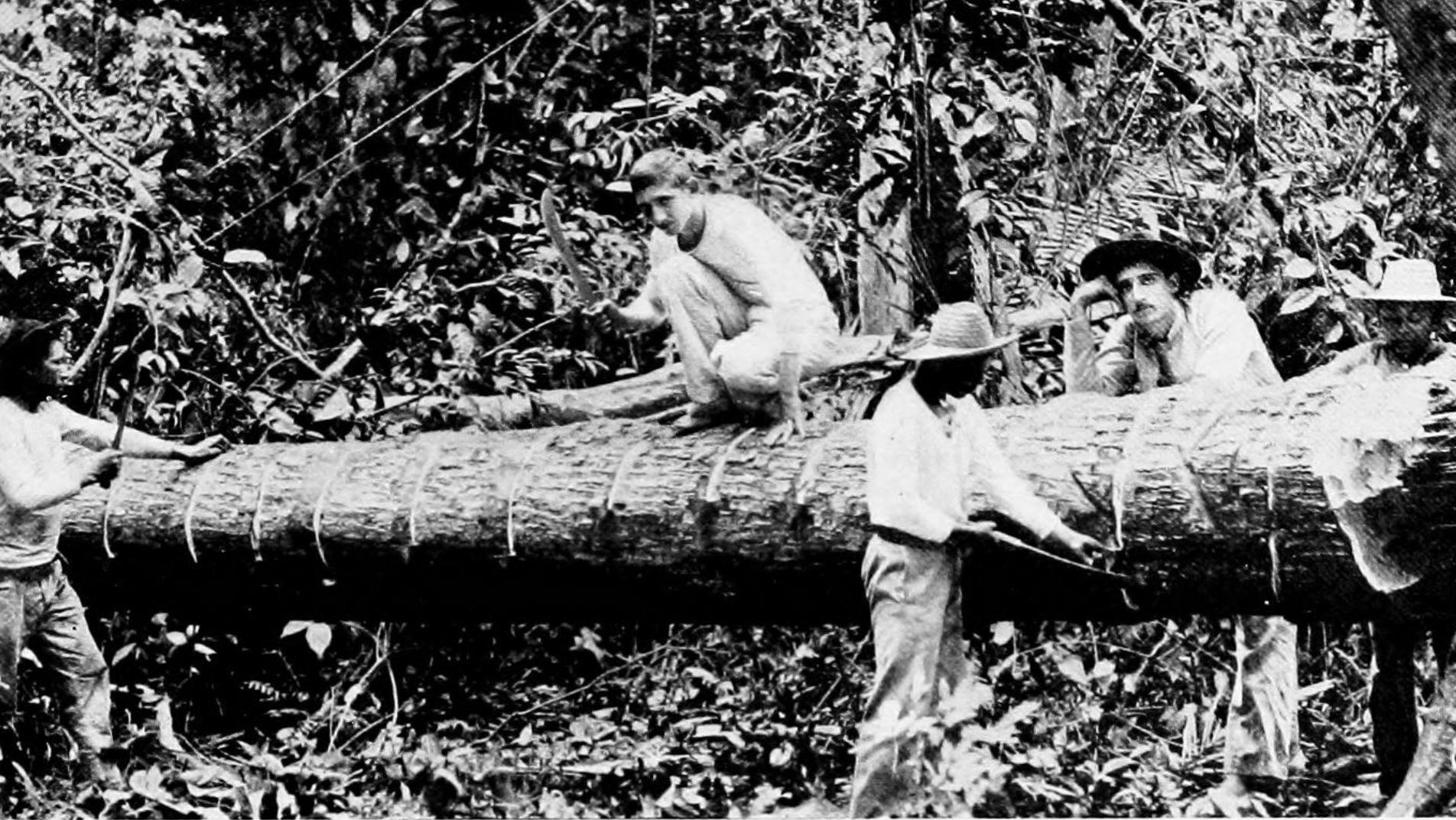
"The only practical method for obtaining the latex of the Caucho tree"

Leopoldo Bernucci states that "since Da Cunha's efforts to categorize him [Scharff] in a social taxonomy were in vain, once again Euclides resorted to science", producing an archetype that describes the rubber baron in his essay. Hecht also names Scharff as "the model for the Caucho King in Da Cunha's essay Os Caucheiros"

At first glance he would seem to represent the common case of a civilized man gone native, in a terrifying backslide in which civilized characteristics are erased by primitive forms of activity. But that would be a mistake. He does not combine the counter-posed states to create a stable, defined activity that might be termed 'hybrid'. He merely puts them side-by-side; he does not mix them together. He is a case of psychic mimetism: a man who pretends to be a savage in order to defeat the savage. He is a gentleman and wild man according to circumstance ...

— Euclides da Cunha, Os Caucheros

Da Cunha declared that the portage point leading to Curiuja was impractical, as there were difficulties in navigating the river leading to it, as well as a rough road that contained enough obstacles that a person could make the conclusion the area was abandoned. One of the difficulties impeding navigation was disruption by small rapids, as well as the fact that the Purus River diminishes in throughput past the Curanja. (Note: The Curanja River is located within the Upper Purus basin.)

Curanja, which was once a prosperous and lively station, today it is in clear decay and lifeless, for the which contributes greatly to the removal of caucheiros, currently dedicated to the extraction of rubber. Those that exist here, like the others up to the headwaters, are organized, aggregated, or dependent on Mr. Carlos Sharf, who is, undeniably, the great land lord of all these places

— Euclides da Cunha

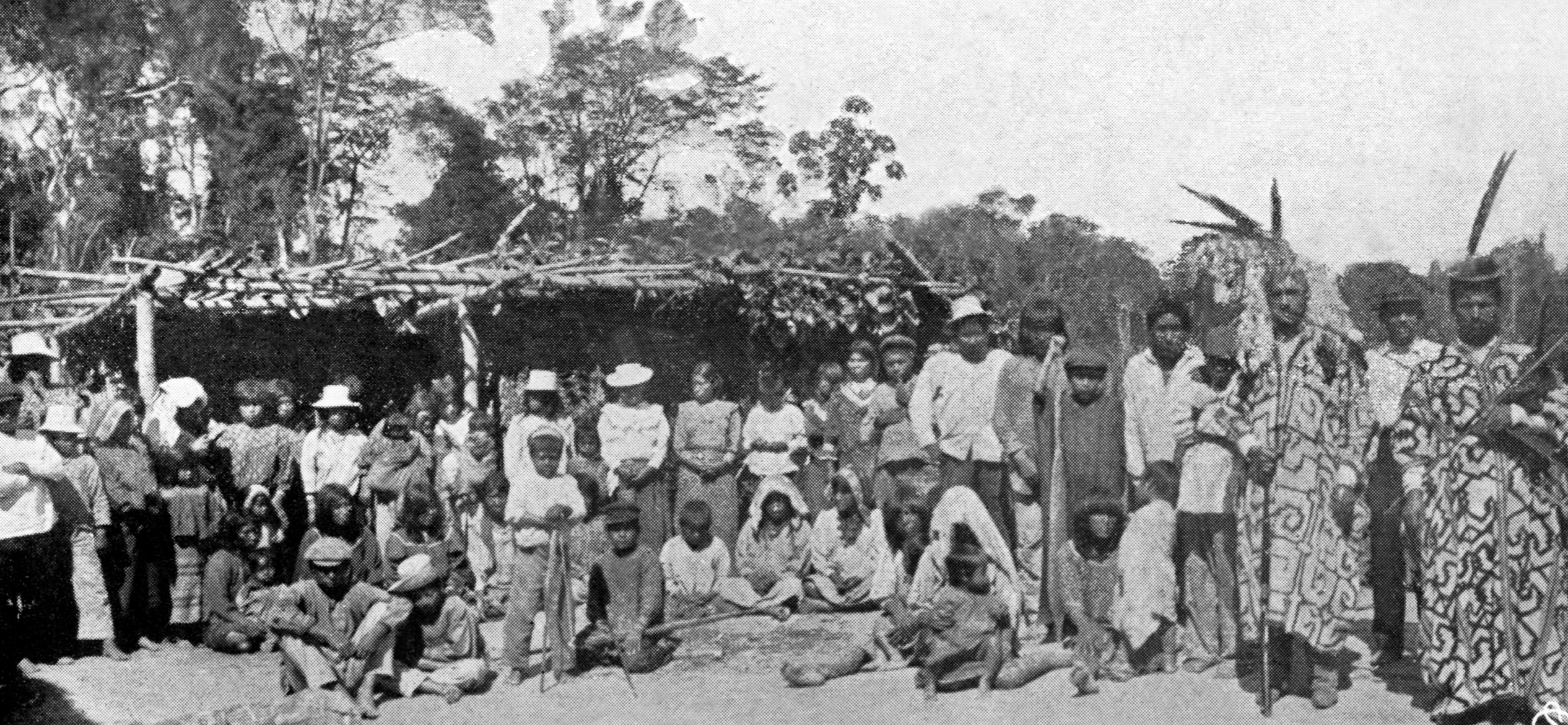
"Piro workers at Carlos Scharff's house in Curanja" (1905)

==== 1905-1909: On the Las Piedras River ====
In 1905 the Department of Loreto credited Scharff with the establishment of a portage route that linked the Purus River to the Madre de Dios River, using the Las Piedras tributary as an intermediary link between those two important rivers. The geographic society of Lima mentions that Scharff relocated "almost all of his rubber personnel from the Purus basin" towards the Piedras River.

Along Scharff's new territory, sugar mills, rice mills, farina production factories, plantations for crops, ranches, and other systems of production were established. The society also credits him with facilitating commercial movement along the Upper Piedras River and its tributaries. (Note: Another document from the department of Loreto, written by Hildebrando Fuentes further reiterated the claim that Scharff discovered that the Purus River was connected to the Madre de Dios area.) Scharff settled his barraccas on the Ceticayo, Chanchamayo, Lidia, Curiacu, Pariamanu, Esperanza and Huáscar tributaries of the Las Piedras River according to Wenceslao Fernández Moro, a Dominican priest who lived in the Madre de Dios region. (Note: Fernández published a book in 1952 based on his knowledge collected during his time as a priest in the Madre de Dios Region.) According to the society of Lima's information, around 1906 he had a staff of 972 "civilized men, chosen as rubber tappers, outside of the Piros, Campas, and Chanas Indians." The previously entrapped tribes of natives continued to follow this enterprise through each migration so they could be used as a workforce.

Scharff managed to rebuild his fortune in a short amount of time after the border conflict with Brazil according to his biographer at the Geographic Society of Lima. The development of a new portage route from a tributary of the Las Piedras River that would allow access into the Urubamba began around 1909, however Scharff did not live long enough to see its completion.

=== Mutiny and death ===
The India Rubber World published an article on 1 January 1910, that reported the death of Carlos Scharff at the hands of his own workers. (Note: "Scharff was later killed by 'his' Indians - perhaps an occupational hazard in terror slavery.") (Note: The reasons for rebellion as stated by F. Marin (?) were poor conditions regarding work as well as food, and the sale of a group of Piro natives to another boss.) According to the article, the mutiny occurred near the beginning of September along the Las Piedras River where Scharff had recently gathered around 500 tons of rubber. At the time of his death, Scharff was reported to have owed around $3,000,000 to creditors in Iquitos, Manaus, and Para. Some of these creditors and Baldimero Rodriguez attempted to collect the remaining rubber at Scharff's estate, but their expedition never returned. While other sources do not agree with the year of Scharff's death being 1909, the India Rubber World and the Manaus newspaper Amazonas were the first sources to report that the mutiny occurred in September of that year. (Note: The indigenous account gives the date of August 1918 for the mutiny against Scharff.)

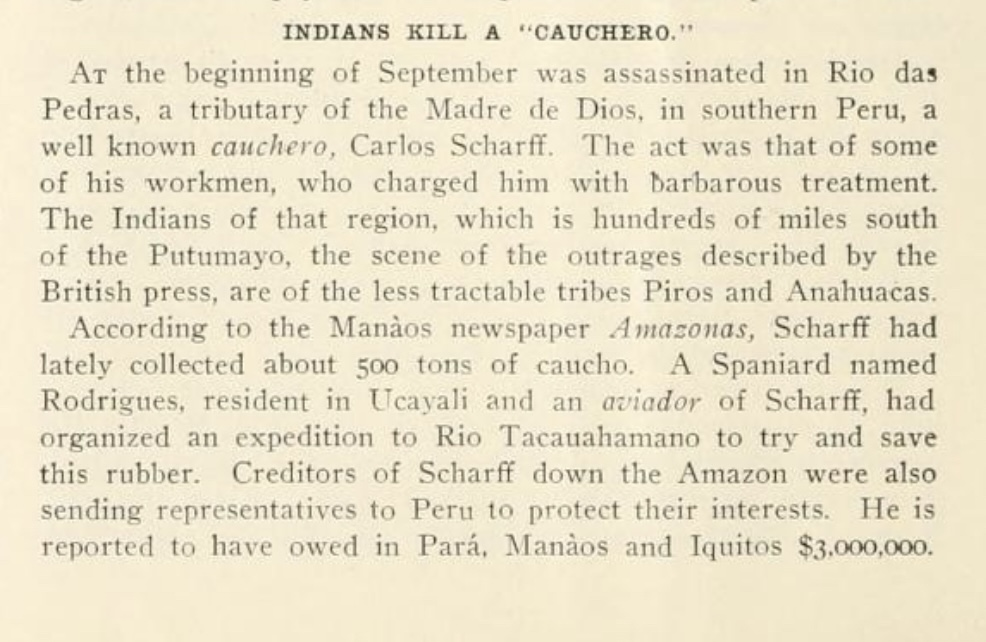
"Indians kill a 'Cauchero'" by John O. De Wolf

An indigenous account of the mutiny against Scharff was produced by Teodoro Sebastián, a Yine descendant from a group that was once exploited by Scharff. According to Teodoro, around 500 indigenous families were enslaved and working under Carlos Scharff around the time of the rebellion. The various social groups and families were intermixed with each other at various rubber collecting camps. These families and workers were often punished by Scharff's employees and enforcers when they did not bring enough rubber to satisfy their exploiters. The indigenous females were also constantly harassed and abused, which became another incentivizing factor to rebel against the boss, Carlos Scharff. In Teodoro's account, a Cushitineri chief named Elías Sebastián instigated the rebellion and organized the Natives; Scharff had previously provided them with rifles and shotguns for the sake of capturing other natives. Usually, such trusted indigenous catechizers were accompanied by a white employee; however, on this last occasion these hunters were being sent out by themselves, with no oversight from any non-natives. After preparing for a long journey, the natives returned to the Scharff household, and killed Carlos Scharff and ten of his employees This included Scharff's long-term business partner, Leopoldo Collazos. All inside the Scharff house, except for a single employee and Carlos's wife were killed in the mutiny. After the attack, the Cushitineri chief told the natives around him that they had to disperse in order to hide from any potential retaliation. (Note: A group of Mashco natives disappeared around the Manu River during Farabee's first expedition, close to the time of the mutiny that killed Carlos Scharff. Baldimero Rodriguez apparently had a lot of them in his employ.)

Around 1908, anthropologist William Curtis Farabee was travelling through the region to find "the home of the Amahuaca" which was located around the Sepahua, Piedras, and Purus Rivers. Farabee was accompanied by Carlos Scharff's brother, Mathias, who was leading the way to Carlos's camp on the Upper Las Piedras river for Farabee's expedition. However, they found that Carlos was killed in a mutiny before Farabee's expedition could reach the camp. According to Farabee, this mutiny was carried out and perpetrated by Amahuaca natives.

He had been in the habit of sending a white man with some Indians to bring in men of another tribe. The methods were often barbarous; a few Indians would be captured, more killed and the most put to flight. Just before his death, Scharff (the brother) sent some of his Amahuaca Indians along, armed with Winchesters, to capture a tribe a long distance away. It was the first opportunity these Indians ever had to retaliate, and they decided to make good use of it. Making preparations for a long absence, they soon returned, killed Scharff and his ten white employees and burned the place.

— William Curtis Farabee, Tribes of Eastern Peru

When the reports about the attack against Scharff's settlement reached his other workers, Baldimero Rodriguez along with a group of other men went to investigate what had happened, and to find out if there was any rubber abandoned there. According to William Farabee, "the details will never be known, for he and all of his men were killed, and no white men has since risked a visit. The [Scharff] brother who was killed was the most notorious of all rubber gatherers in the Upper amazon region." (Note: Farabee stayed with Baldimero Rodriguez for a while before the retaliatory expedition to avenge Scharff, however the nature of Scharff's business relationship with Rodriguez was not documented. Farabee used him as a source of information regarding the Conibo, due to the fact that Baldimero "lived many years among the Conebo, and spoke their language well." In his book, Indian tribes of Eastern Peru Farabee references an instance he witnessed where a man employed by Rodriguez had arrived at Serajali with five Piro families. Then he states "The Piro, like many of the other tribes of the rubber region, have been captured in the past and treated as slaves.") (Note: A man named Torres is mentioned in Farabee's book as another source of information regarding the Piro tribe. Before moving to the Madre de Dios region, this Torres was employed in the Putumayo region to oversee a group of Huitoto natives in rubber collection. He migrated to the confluence of the Madre de Dios and Los Amigos Rivers with this band of Huitoto workers, a journey of more than a thousand miles. According to Farabee, a number of these natives died on the way from dysentery and fevers. It appeared as if Torres was still in control of around twenty Witoto families by 1909. Farabee does not mention how Torres and Carlos Scharff were related, however due to their proximity they were likely familiar with each other. The geographic society of Lima states that Scharff had Huitoto natives under his control, and is possibly referencing these families that migrated to the Las Piedras region.)

According to the Sociedad Geografica de Lima, the mutiny was instigated by Peruvian rubber tappers that were initially working for Scharff. The Dominican priest Wenceslao's historical account corroborated that the mutiny was carried out by both white and indigenous people. These Peruvian rebels were helped by a group of around 180 Piro natives, and Scharff was killed on 28 July 1909, which is Peruvian Independence day. The group consisted of nine rubber tappers who were initially working at a rubber station named Zeticayo, on another tributary of the Las Piedras River. These nine men got together and murdered three other Peruvians on 17 July. (Note: Two out of three of these murdered Peruvians had the honorific of "Don" in front of their name, which would imply that they were in charge of the station.) The Sociedad Geografica de Lima's account stated that the rebels attacked Scharff's settlement on the Curiyacu tributary during the afternoon of 28 July 1909. Salvador Pasmiño (also spelled Patino within the same document) executed Scharff by shooting him in the heart at point blank range, after an assault on his house. Carlos's corpse was mutilated by his attackers and then his settlement was burned down. Leopoldo Collazos and a number of Scharff's employees were killed in the fighting, while a few others ran away. (Note: Wenceslao Fernández mentions that Collazos was the man who originally sold the rebelling piros into Scharff's service.) Scharff's body later received a burial at the request of a native Curaca named Uraquia. This same chief is said to have saved the lives of Carlos's wife and son from the massacre. The wife and son were able to travel to Puerto Maldonado, where a number of Scharff's employees were gathering in hopes of avenging their boss, and collecting any remaining rubber at his station. According to the geographic society of Lima, Amaringo along with his Asháninka mercenaries led retaliatory expeditions against the Piros they could find in the area.

=== Legacy ===
Sometime after the 1909 mutiny, the Brazilian federal government denied a reimbursement claim of Scharff's, regarding an estimated £200,000 worth of damages suffered during the conflict on the border. An application that was filed by Carlos Scharff for a "vast concession" of land in the rubber forest along the Upper Las Piedras River, was also declined by the Peruvian government. With Scharff's enterprise dissolved, his wife lost her financial security and she was left with only a few dozen workers.

Scharff's son had the same name as him and is confirmed by the Lima Geographic Society to have survived the 1909 mutiny. His mother found an ally and a protector by the name of Teobaldo Gonzalez, who helped sponsor the young Scharff, and had been apparently "treating him as a true son." In 1912, at the request of his family, Carlos Scharff's body was disinterred from the grave at Curiyacu, and reburied in the City of Lima, at the Panteon De Bellavista. According to the biography of Carlos Scharff published in 1917 by the Geographic Society of Lima, his son was sent to Lima, where he was educated.

In early June 1940, during a flight over the Manu River, pilots Luis Conterno and Votto Elmore spotted a settlement near the beginning of the Pinquen tributary. Initially they believed it was a Piro settlement, which had a fierce local reputation due to the rebellion that killed Carlos Scharff. After investigating the settlement the pilots discovered it was inhabited by rubber extractors, who had been isolated and cut off from Puerto Maldonado and Iquitos ever since the 1909 rebellion.

According to the personal experiences of the Dominican missionary Alvarez who gave his account in 1996, the Mascho Piro Natives maintained through conversation that they were the descendants of Natives taken away from the Urubamba by Carlos Scharff, who used the Natives as slaves. After Scharff's death, the Natives apparently chose to flee into remote parts of the forests to avoid any potential reprisals.

Decades after the death of Carlos Scharff, Søren Hvalkof discovered that the family was still practicing debt bondage against the native population near Atalaya in 1987. He met Carlos Scharff's nephew, who is only known by Sr C.D. and his aunt, who was referred to as E. Scharff. (Note: C.D. was operating a rubber station at Cocani at the time.) This revelation became clear to Hvalkof after E. Scharff procured an arrest order against a native because he owed labor to the estate of Sra. Scharff. Hvalkof wrote about part of his conversation with C.D. Scharff, and later published it in 1998.

His grandfather and father, together with the priest, had raped all of the young indigenous women in the area, he told me proudly - "hundreds of them, just like this one here", he added pointing to the plump Asháninka girl sitting in the back end of the boat ... Whilst we were eating and drinking, Don C.D. entertained me with more details about his grandfather's, father's and uncle's excesses, and of the trade in indigenous women and children. He had now arrived at the chapter concerning how many Campa men they had killed. For little reason, and often for no reason at all, he told me proudly. Loads of them. Why? Because that was how things were in those days. But in the end it turned out badly, he added, because both his father and his uncle were finally murdered by the Indians. Both were killed in an ambush by the Amahuaca. Now he was continuing the proud tradition of his family, although he could not compete with all the exploits of his ancestors.

— Søren Hvalkof, Liberation through land rights

== See also ==
- Putumayo genocide
