= Ǫ́ =

Latin letter O with acute accent and ogonek

O with acute and ogonek
- Ǫ́ ǫ́

Usage
- Type: alphabetic
- Language of origin: Chipewyan, Iñapari, Navajo,

Ǫ́, lowercase ǫ́, is a letter used in the alphabets of Chipewyan, Iñapari, and Navajo. It is the letter O with an acute accent and an ogonek.

== Usage ==
Ǫ́ is generally used to mark nasalization along with stress or high tone in American indigenous languages such as Chipewyan, Iñapari, and Navajo.

== Computer representations ==
The O acute ogonek currently has no individual character in Unicode, but it can be represented by the following characters:

- Composed of normalised NFC (Latin Extended-B, Combining Diacritical Marks):

Forms	Representations	Channels of characters	Code points	Descriptions
Capital	Ǫ́	Ǫ ◌́	U+01EA; U+0301	Capital Latin letter O with ogonek Combining acute
Small	ǫ́	ǫ ◌́	U+01EB; U+0301	Small Latin letter o with ogonek Combining acute

- Decomposed and normalised NFD (Basic Latin, Combining Diacritical Marks):

Forms	Representations	Channels of characters	Code points	Descriptions
Capital	Ǫ́	O ◌̨ ◌́	U+004F; U+0328; U+0301	Capital Latin letter o Combining ogonek Combining acute
Small	ǫ́	o ◌̨ ◌́	U+006F; U+0328; U+0301	Small Latin letter o Combining ogonek Combining acute

== See also ==
- O (letter)
- Grave accent
- Ogonek
