= Katukína-Kanamarí language =

Katukinan language spoken in Brazil

Katukina-Kanamari
- Native to: Brazil
- Region: Amazonas
- Ethnicity: 38 Tsohom-dyapa (2016), 4,684 Kanamari (2020), 2,004 Katukina do rio Biá (2020)
- Native speakers: 1,300 (2006)
- Language family: Harákmbut–Katukinan: Katukinian; Katukina-Kanamari
- Dialects: Kanamari (Dyapá); Katukina; Tsohom-Djapá

Official status
- Official language in: Brazil (Amazonas)

Language codes
- ISO 639-3: Either: knm – Kanamari (shared with Canamaré) kav – Katukina
- Glottolog: kana1291
- ELP: Dyapá

Katukina-Kanamari is a Katukinan language spoken by about 650 individuals in Amazonas, Brazil. It is considered endangered.

The two principal varieties, Kanamari (Canamarí) and Katukina (Catuquina), are mutually intelligible, and have both been confused with neighboring languages with the same or similar names.

Synonyms and dialect names include Tshom-djapa, Tsohon-djapa, Wiri-dyapá, Pidá-dyapá, Kutiá-dyapá (Kadiu-diapa, Cutiadapa), Tucun-diapa, Bendiapa, Parawa.

== Etymology ==
The term Katukina is derived from the Proto-Purus term *ka-tukanɨ, meaning 'speaker of an indigenous language'. As a result, it is used to refer to a few different unrelated languages belonging to separate language families, including Panoan and Arawakan:

- Katukina (Arawakan)
- Katukína (Panoan)
- Catuquinarú (unclassified)

== Phonology ==
=== Consonants ===
		Labial	Alveolar	Palatal	Velar	Glottal
Plosive	voiceless	p	t	tʃ	k	
Plosive	voiced	b	d	dʒ		
Nasal		m	n	ɲ		
Fricative						h
Approximant			l			

An alveolar lateral consonant /l/ may be realized as a retroflex lateral [ɭ]. A velar nasal [ŋ] sound is often heard when following after nasal vowels. A glottal stop [ʔ] can be heard before word-initial vowels. A word-final /k/ may also sound unreleased [k̚].

=== Vowels ===
	Front	Central	Back	
	Front	Central	unrounded	rounded
High	i iː		ɯ ɯː	u uː
Low		a aː		

/i/ and /u/ may be realized as approximant sounds [j] and [w], when preceding another vowel.

== Grammar ==
The syntax of Kanamarí is characterized by ergative–absolutive alignment. The absolutive argument (i.e. the subject of intransitive verbs and the object of transitive verbs) is unmarked for case, and usually appears following the verb phrase.

tyuku wa:pa
die dog
'The dog died.'

no-ti paiko
2.SG.GEN-kill grandfather
'You killed grandfather.'

If the absolutive argument is a pronoun, it is represented by its free-standing form.

ki:tan idi:k
sleep 2.SG
'You slept.'

The ergative argument (i.e. the agent of transitive verbs) is marked for genitive case. If the agent is a pronoun, it is represented by a genitive prefix (as in no-ti paiko 'you killed grandfather' above). If the agent is a full noun, it is linked to the verb with the case marker na, which phonologically attaches to the verb:

pi:da na=ti paiko
jaguar GEN=kill grandfather
'The jaguar killed grandfather.'
