= Machinere =

Regions with significant populations
- Bolivia: 52 (2012)
- Brazil (Acre): 937 (2004)
- Peru: 90 (2007)

Languages
- Machinere

Related ethnic groups
- Mashco-Piro and Yine

The Machinere are an Indigenous people of Brazil, Bolivia, and Peru. They live along the Acre River in Bolivia. In Brazil they mostly live in the Mamoadate Indigenous Territory, although some live in the Chico Mendes Extractivist Reserve, both in Acre.

== Name ==
Besides Machinere, they are also called Machineri, Manchinere, Manchineri, Manitenére, Manitenerí, and Maxinéri.

== Economy and subsistence ==
Machinere people hunt, fish, and farm using the swidden method. They grow crops of maize, manioc, rice, papaya, peanut, pumpkin, sugarcane, and sweet potato.
