= Canamaré language =

Language

Canamaré
- Kanamari, Kanamaré, Canamirim
- Native to: Brazil
- Region: Purús River
- Extinct: c. early 20th century
- Language family: Arawakan: Southern; Piro?; Yine; Canamaré

Language codes
- ISO 639-3: knm (shared with Kanamari)
- Glottolog: None yine1238 Yine
- Linguasphere: 82-BCA-af

Canamaré (Kanamaré, Kanamari) is an extinct Arawakan language of the Purús River near the Peruvian–Brazilian border. Kaufman (1994) lists it as a Piro language; Aikhenvald leaves it unclassified.

It was described as a dialect of Yine in the original wordlist.

Ethnologue 17 confuses it with a living Katuquinan language of the same name.
