= Yine language =

Maipurean language spoken in Peru

Yine
- Piro
- yinerɨ tokanɨ
- Pronunciation: [jine-lɨ tokanɨ]
- Native to: Peru
- Ethnicity: Yine people, Manchineri
- Native speakers: 4,000 (2010)
- Language family: Arawakan: Southern; Piro; Yine
- Dialects: Yine; Machinere; Canamaré †

Language codes
- ISO 639-3: pib
- Glottolog: yine1238
- ELP: Piro; Maxineri

Yine (Yine: yinerɨ tokanɨ 'Yine people's language') is a Maipurean language spoken in Peru by about 4,000 people.

== Names ==
Yine is also called Chontaquiro, Pira, Piro, Pirro, Simiranch, or Simirinche. The name Mashco, a derogatory name for the linguistically unrelated Harakmbut, has sometimes been incorrectly applied to the Yine and other similar groups, such as the Mashco Piro. The name Piro is apparently derived from a Panoan-language name for a species of Megalodoras catfish.

== Classification ==
The Manchineri who live in Brazil (Acre) and reportedly also in Bolivia speak Machinere, which may be a dialect of Yine, though the Yine are reported to require a month of practice before they can communicate with the Machinere. A vocabulary of a language labeled Canamaré is "so close to Piro [Yine] as to count as Piro", but has been a cause of confusion with the unrelated Kanamarí language. Yine belongs to the Piro group which also includes the nearly extinct Iñapari and Apurinã. The Kuniba language is a "co-dialect" of Yine.

== Varieties ==
Varieties of Piro (Yine):

- Chontaquiro (Simirinche, Upatarinavo): Ucayali River
- Manchineri (Manatinavo): Purus River
- Kushichineri (Kuxiti-neri, Kujigeneri, Cusitinavo): upper Purus River in Peru (in 1886, spoken on the Curumahá River or Curanja River, and probably also on the Cujar River)
- Kuniba (Kunibo): Juruá River
- Katukina: Juruá River. Documented by Natterer (1833). Not to be confused with the unrelated Katukina language.
- Canamare (Canamirim, Canamary): Iaco River, a tributary of the Purus River. Documented by Spix (1819). Not to be confused with the unrelated Kanamarí language.
- Mashco-Piro: Madre de Dios River

== Demographics ==
As of 2000, essentially all of the 4,000 ethnic Yine people speak the language.

== Geographical distribution ==
They live in the Ucayali and Cusco Departments, near the Ucayali River, and near the Madre de Dios River in the Madre de Dios Region in Peru.

== Phonology ==
=== Vowels ===
	Front	Central	Back
Close	i iː	ɨ ɨː	
Mid	e eː		o oː
Open		a aː	

Vowels are phonetically nasalized after /m, n, h̃/.

=== Consonants ===
	Labial	Alveolar	Post-alveolar	Palatal	Velar	Glottal
Nasal	m	n				h̃
Plosive	p	t		c~c͡ç	k	
Affricate		t͡s	t͡ʃ			
Fricative		s	ʃ	ç		
Flap		ɾ				
Approximant	w	l		j		

/h̃/ is phonetically nasalized. /w/ becomes a bilabial approximant [β̞] before a close vowel. /n/ assimilates to [ŋ] before /k/. /ɾ/ can be trilled [r] when in word-initial position. The palatal stop varies in articulation between a stop and an affricate.

== Writing system ==
Literacy is comparatively high. A dictionary has been published in the language and the language is taught alongside Spanish in some Yine schools.

== Syntax ==
Piro has an active–stative syntax.
