= Jean-Paul Van Belle =

- Born: 29 July 1961 (age 65); Bruges, Belgium
- Education: University of Ghent; Stellenbosch University; University of Cape Town
- Occupation: Professor

Jean-Paul Van Belle is a professor of information technology and director at the Centre for Information Technology and National Development in Africa at the University of Cape Town. He was head of the department of Information Technology at the University of Cape Town from 2008 to 2011.

Van Belle has written over 120 published peer reviewed articles in the fields of service-oriented architecture, unified communications within businesses, open source software, mobile computing, and information and communication technologies for development.

In 2012 he established the UCT-Samsung Mobile Innovation Lab at the University of Cape Town.

In 2011 Van Belle was the first person to photograph the Mascho-Piro people whilst on vacation in Peru.
