= Mashco Piro =

Amazonian indigenous tribe

Nomole

Total population
- >1000 (2024)

Regions with significant populations
- Peru

Languages
- Mashco Piro

The Nomole (endonym), also known by the derogatory term Mashco Piro, are an indigenous tribe of nomadic hunter-gatherers who inhabit the remote regions of the Amazon rainforest. They live in Manú National Park in the Madre de Dios Region in Peru. They have actively avoided contact with non-native peoples.

== Demographics ==
In 1998, the International Work Group for Indigenous Affairs (IWGIA) estimated their number to be around 100 to 250. This is an increase from the 1976 estimated population of 20 to 100. In 2024, their number was believed to be above 750.

The Nomole tribe speaks a dialect of the Piro language. Mashco (originally spelled "Maschcos") is a term which was first used by Padre Biedma in 1687 to refer to the Harakmbut people. It is considered a derogatory term, due to its meaning of 'savages' in the Piro language; Nomole (relative) is the name the people apply to themselves.

== History ==
The Amazon rubber boom began to affect the Upper Ucayali in the early to mid 1880s and brought a wave of migrants to the region. While slavery was officially abolished in Peru in 1854, slave raids targeting indigenous peoples along the Ucayali and its tributaries became common occurrences. Debt peonage was the legal excuse for the "ownership" of other peoples. The system of peonage as it was implemented in the rubber boom in Peru has been referred to as slavery by contemporary observers and anthropologist. By 1891, most of the Piro people along the Urubamba were indebted to Peruvian rubber baron Carlos Fitzcarrald.

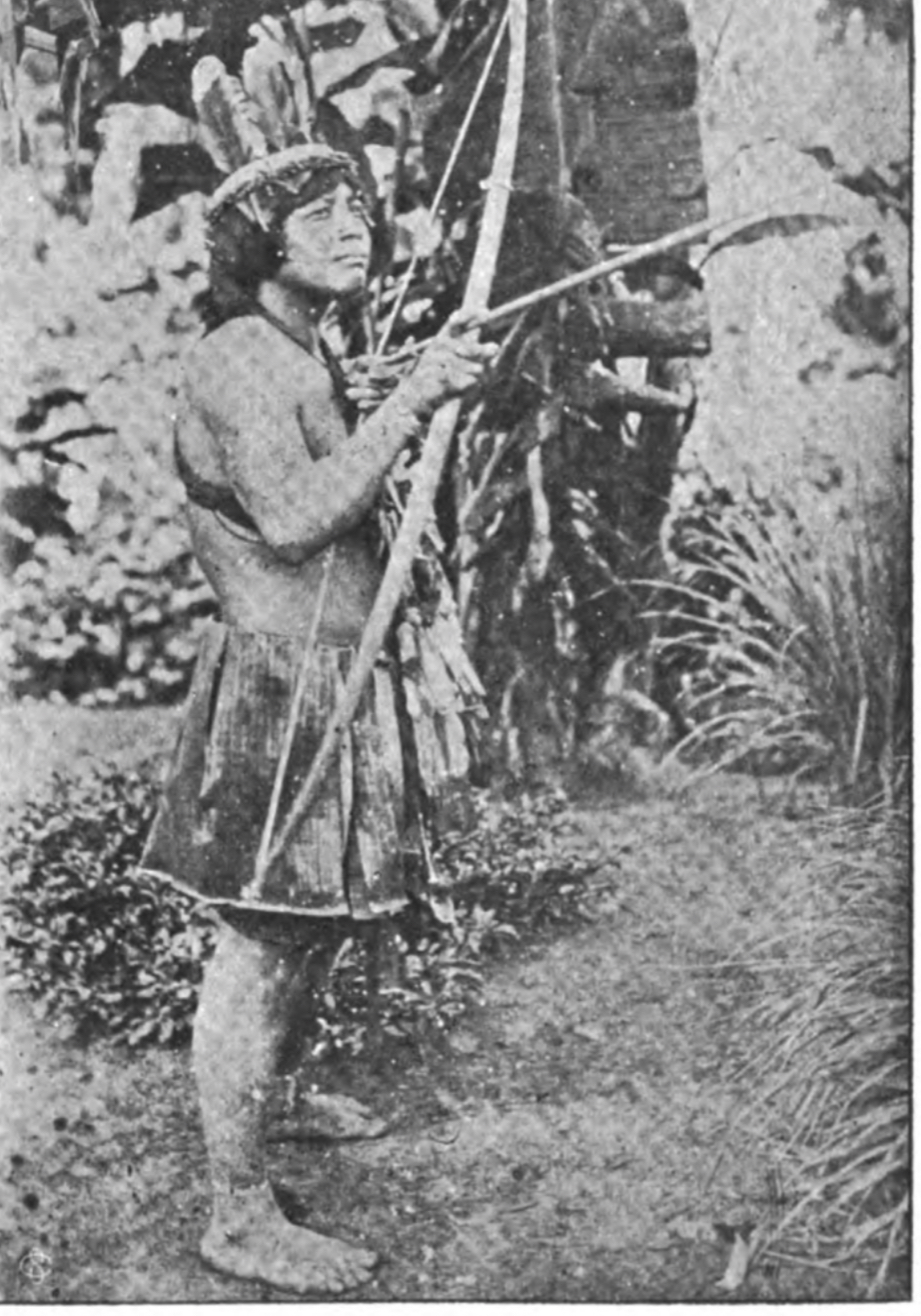
Huachipayri (Harakmbut) man in the Madre de Dios River valley.

After the development of a portage route named The Isthmus of Fitzcarrald around 1893-1894, most of the Nomole people in the upper Manú River area were slaughtered by Fitzcarrald's private army. The portage route connected the Urubamba tributary of Mishagua to the Manú River, a tributary of Madre de Dios. This development facilitated the exploitation of indigenous people and rubber sources on the Peruvian side of the Madre de Dios River. Many Mashco and Piro people were also enslaved by Fitzcarrald's foreman Carlos Scharff between 1897 and 1909 along the Purús and Madre de Dios Rivers. The survivors retreated to the remote forest areas. The sightings of the Nomole tribe members increased in the 21st century. According to the anthropologist Glenn Shepard, who had an encounter with the Nomole in 1999, the increased sightings of the tribe could be due to illegal logging in the area and low-flying aircraft associated with oil and gas exploration.

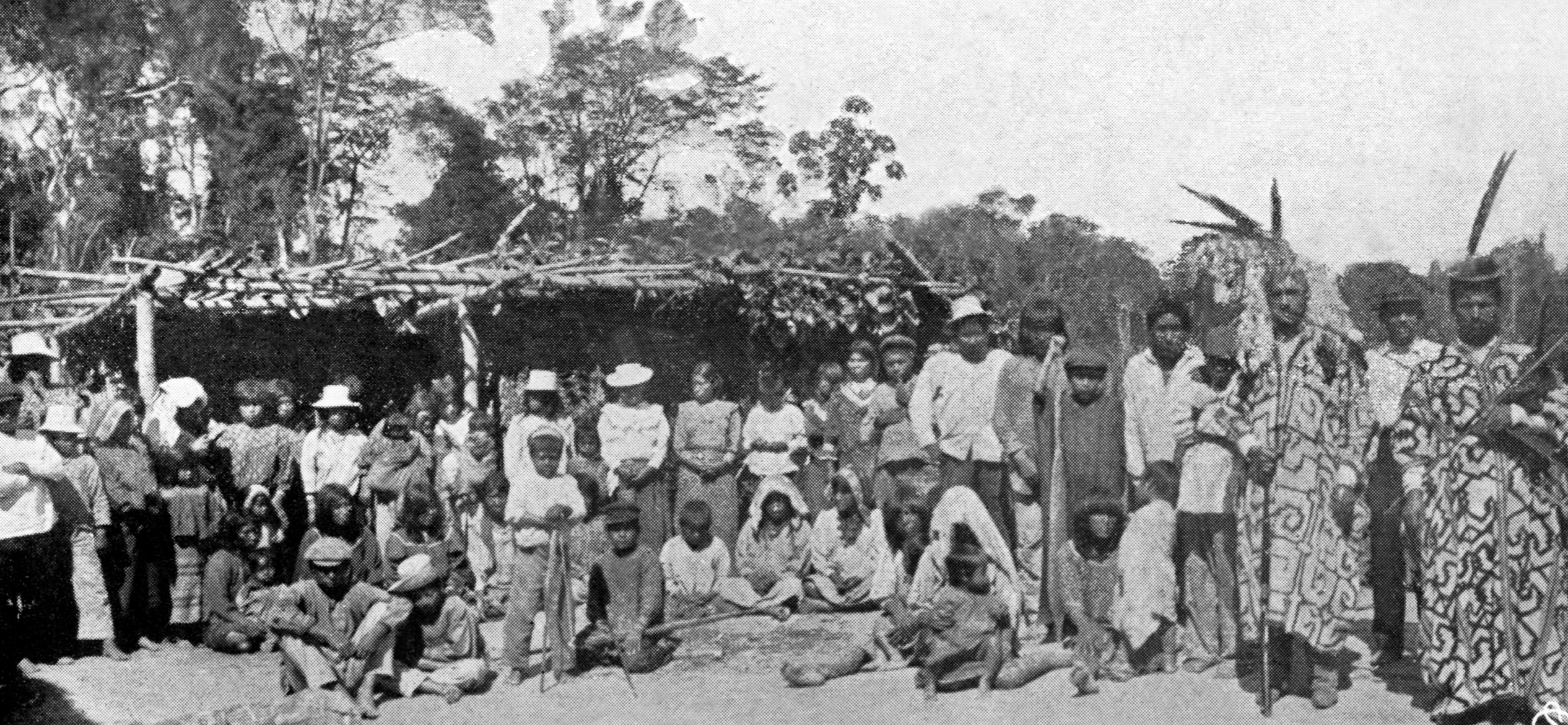
“Piro workers at Carlos Scharff’s house in Curanja, 1905”

In September 2007, a group of ecologists filmed about 20 members of the Nomole tribe from a helicopter flying above the Alto Purús national park. The group had established camp on the banks of the Las Piedras river near the Peruvian and Brazilian border. Scientists believe that the tribe prefers to construct palm-leaf huts on riverbanks during the dry season for fishing. During the wet season, they retreat to the rain forest. Similar huts were spotted in the 1980s.

In October 2011, the Peru Ministry of Environment released a video of a few Nomole, taken by some travelers. Gabriella Galli, an Italian visitor to the park, also captured a photograph of the tribe members.

In 2012, Survival International released some new photographs of the tribe members. The archaeologist Diego Cortijo of the Spanish Geographical Society claimed to have captured photographs of a Nomole family from the Manú National Park, while on an expedition along the Madre de Dios River in search of petroglyphs. However, this claim to the photograph was subsequently disputed by Jean-Paul Van Belle, who claimed to have taken these pictures three weeks earlier. His local guide Nicolas "Shaco" Flores, who was found dead six days later with a bamboo-tipped arrow stuck in his chest, is believed to have been killed by members of the Nomole tribe.

In August 2013, the BBC reported that a group of Nomole people had been seen apparently asking neighboring villagers for food. The Peruvian government has banned contact with the Nomole for fear that they might be infected by strangers with diseases to which the Nomole have not built up immunity.

The Nomole language is similar to the Yine language, and members of nearby Yine communities are able to communicate with the Nomole. Yine villages will often plant an extra garden near the edges of the forest, intended to be used by Nomole.

In July 2024, video and images of dozens of uncontacted Nomole people, on the banks of a river a few kilometers from a series of logging concessions, were published by Survival International. In September 2024, at least two loggers were killed by a group of uncontacted Nomole.

== See also ==
- Uncontacted peoples
