= Mashco Piro language =

Arawakan language of Peru

Mashco Piro
- Nomole
- Native to: Peru
- Ethnicity: Mashco Piro
- Native speakers: 200 (2012)
- Language family: Arawakan: Southern; Piro; Yine/Iñapari; Mashco Piro

Language codes
- ISO 639-3: cuj
- Glottolog: mash1270
- ELP: Mashco Piro
- Linguasphere: 82-BCA-ae

Mashco Piro is a poorly attested Arawakan language spoken in Peru, by the Mashco Piro or Nomole (meaning 'brothers' or 'countrymen' in Mashco Piro and Yine). Language documentation is limited, since the Mashco Piro are highly nomadic hunter-gatherers who avoid contact with outsiders.

== Classification ==
It is very similar to the Piro (Yine) language, with an estimated 60% inherent intelligibility. Terrence Kaufman (1994) considered it a dialect of Piro; Alexandra Aikhenvald (1999) suggests it may rather be a dialect of Iñapari. According to the Yine, the language of the Mashco Piro is more archaic than modern Yine, and is between 50 and 80% comprehensible with it.

== Phonology ==
A tentative sketch of Mashco-Piro phonology is presented below.

=== Consonants ===
Phonetic table of Mashco-Piro consonants
		Labial	Alveolar	Post-alveolar	Palatal	Velar	Glottal
Nasal		m	n		ɲ		
Plosive	voiceless	p	t	t͡ʃ		k	ʔ
Plosive	voiced	b	d			g	
Fricative	voiceless		s	ʃ	ç		h
Fricative	voiced	β					
Approximant					j	w	
Flap			ɾ				
Lateral			l				

[ʔ] only occurs word-finally and may not be phonemic. In contrast with Yine, Mashco-Piro /h/ is not nasalized. The four voiced obstruents are unlikely to be phonemic, as is the palatal nasal [ɲ], therefore making the Mashco-Piro consonant inventory identical to that of Yine, though the former lacks the alveolar and palatal affricates /ts, cç/, which are suspected to occur but are unattested in the data.

=== Vowels ===
Phonetic table of vowels
		Front	Central	Back
Close	tense	i		
Close	lax	ɪ		ɯ
Mid	tense	e eː	ə	o õ
Mid	lax	ɛː		
Open			a aː	

[ɪ] occurs exclusively before /ɾ/ and is likely an allophone of /i/ in that environment. [õ] is evidently an allophone of /o/ before a nasal consonant. [ə] is also considered an allophone of /e/. Presumably Mashco-Piro also has contrastive vowel length, though this is not well attested. Its phonemic vowel inventory is thus likely identical to that of Yine:

Phonemic table of vowels
	Front	Central	Back
Close	i (iː)		ɯ (ɯː)
Mid	e eː		o (oː)
Open		a aː	

== Vocabulary ==
Around 300 words in the language were recorded.
