= Yine people =

Indigenous people in Peru

Yine
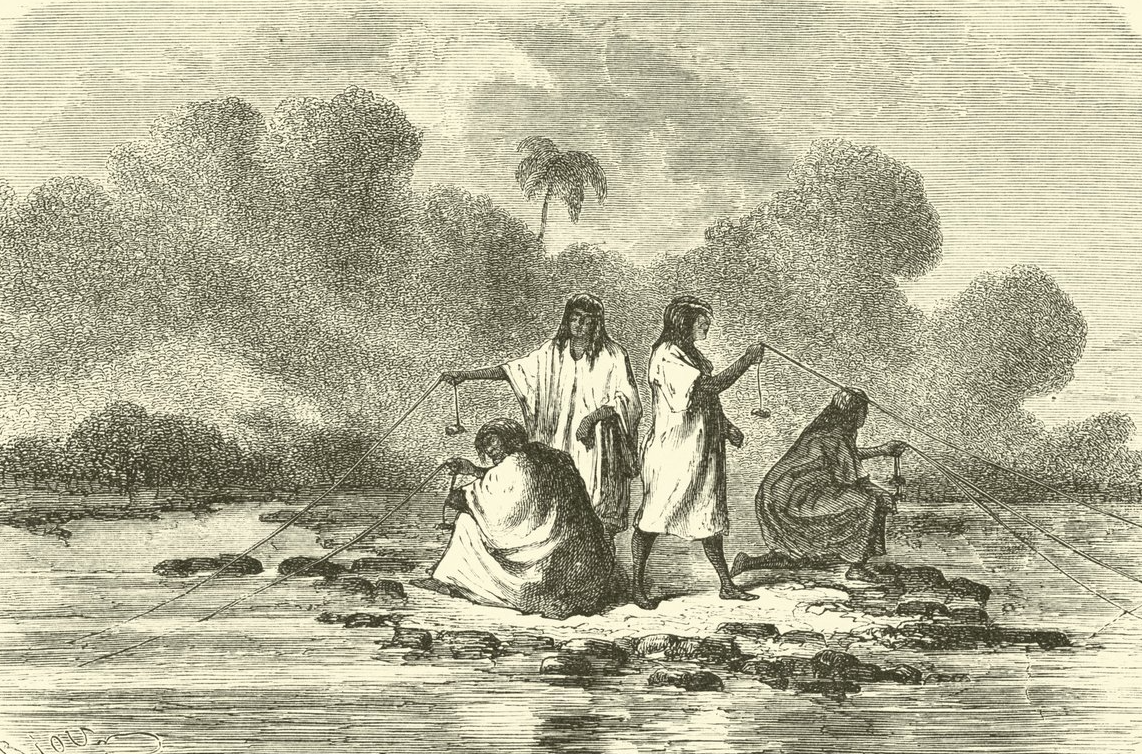
- Piro Indians fishing in 1869

Total population
- 4000–5000 (2000)

Regions with significant populations
- Peru

Languages
- Yine, Asháninka, Machiguenga, Spanish, Quechua

Religion
- Christianity

Related ethnic groups
- Machinere

The Yine (also Piro) are an indigenous people in Peru. In the Cusco, Loreto, and Ucayali Departments, they live along the Urubamba River. They live along the Madre de Dios River in the Madre de Dios Department.

== Name ==
Besides Yine, they are also called Chontaquiro, Contaquiro, Pira, Piro, Pirro, Simiranch, and Simirinche.

== Economy and subsistence ==
Yine people farm, fish, and raise livestock, particularly cattle. They also work in the lumber industry. They traditionally used swidden agriculture to grow yuca. Oxfam helped the Yine to secure ownership rights to their traditional farmlands and to develop sustainable farming practices. They grow several varieties of yuca today, as well as medicine plants, such as sangre de grado (Croton lechleri).

== Language ==
Yine people speak the Yine language, which is a Piro language and part of the Southern Maipuran language family. It is written in the Latin script. Over half of the Yine people have a basic literacy rate.

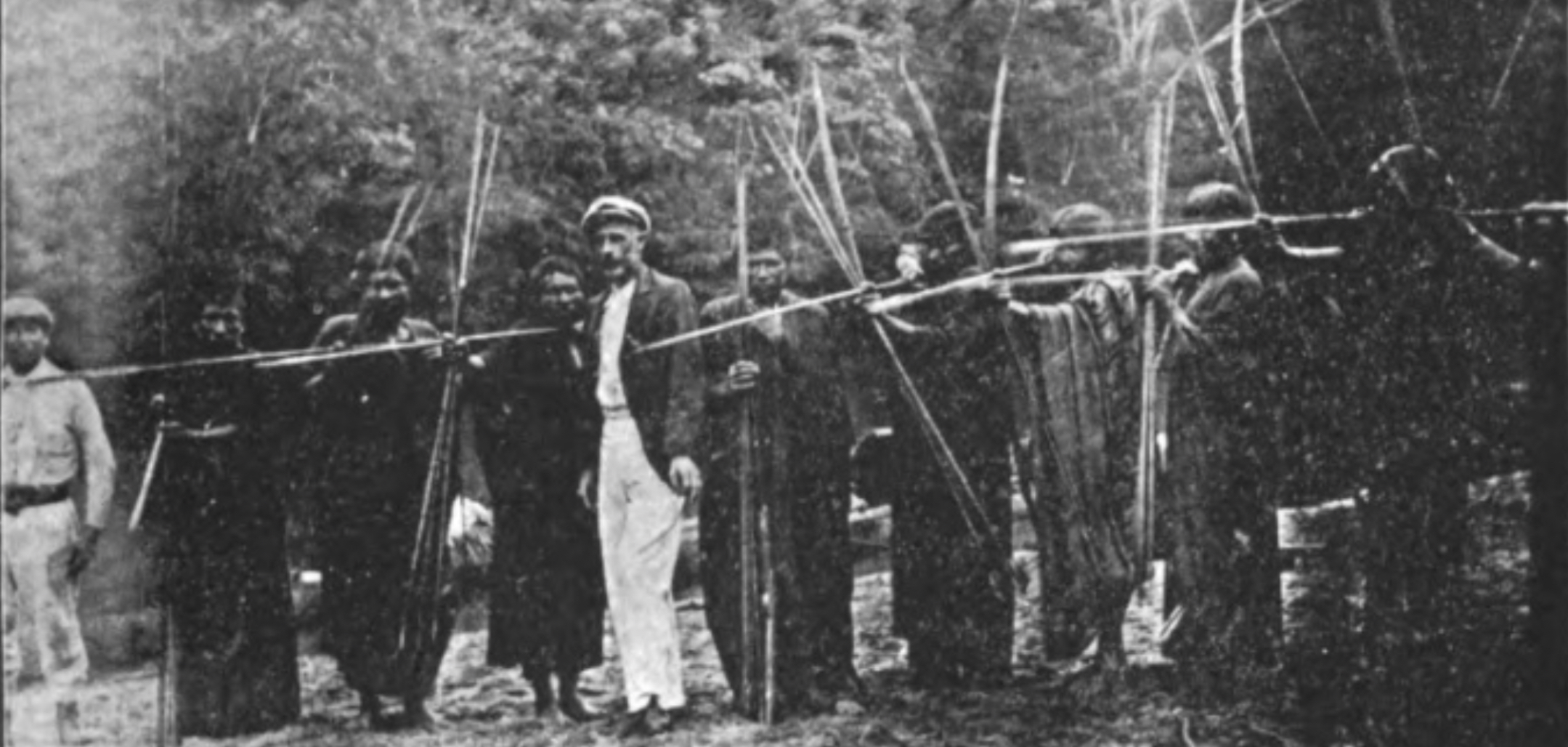
“The boss of the expedition and his Piros”, photograph circa 1903.

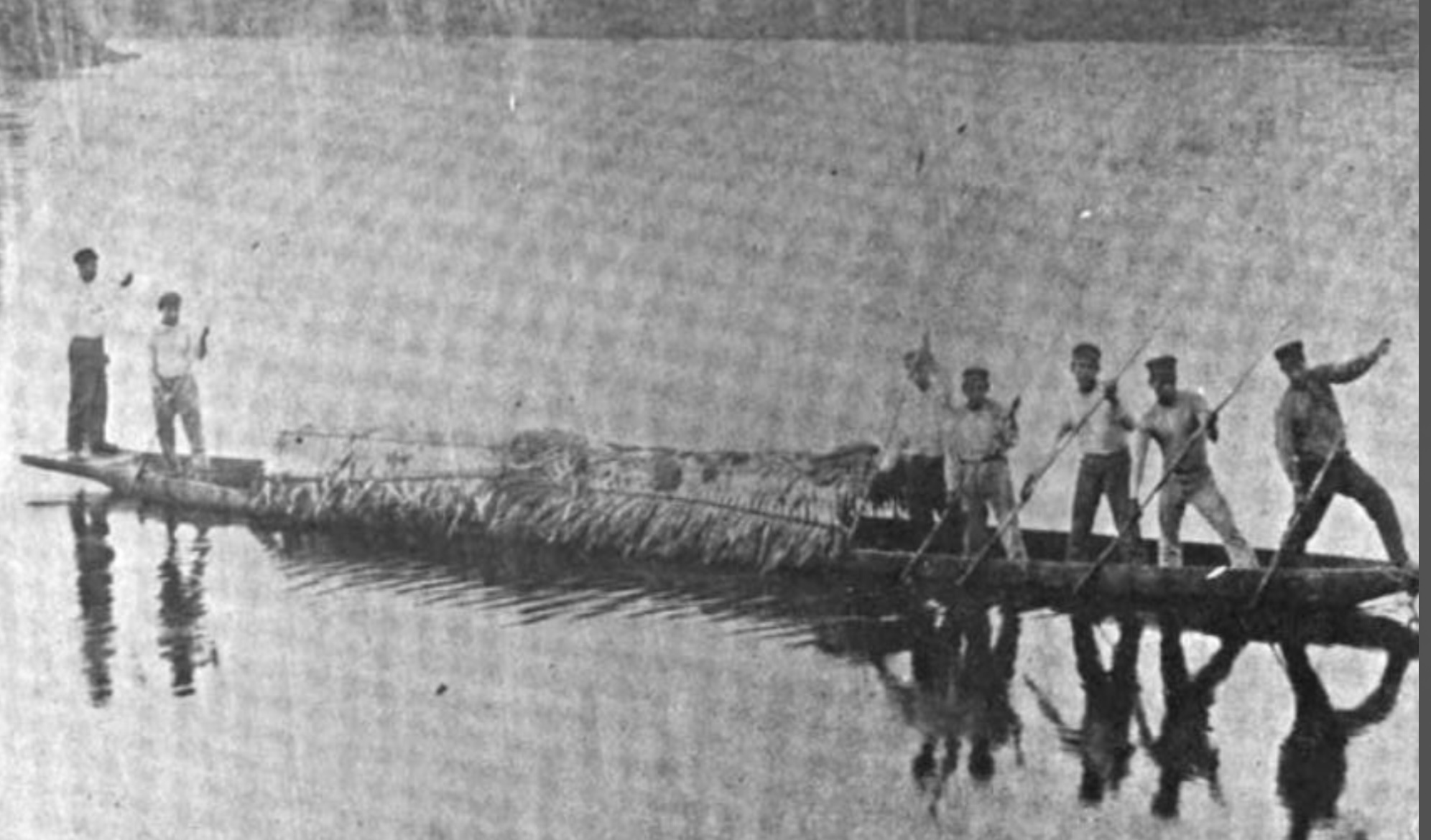
“Piros sailing the Pachitea River”, photograph circa 1901.

== See also ==
- Mashco Piro
