= Iñapari language =

Endangered Arawakan language of Peru

Iñapari
- Native to: Peru
- Region: Las Piedras River (Peru)
- Native speakers: 5 (2020)
- Language family: Arawakan: Southern; Piro; Iñapari
- Dialects: Pacaguara

Official status
- Official language in: Peru

Language codes
- ISO 639-3: inp
- Glottolog: inap1242
- ELP: Iñapari
- Iñapari is classified as Critically Endangered by the UNESCO Atlas of the World's Languages in Danger.

Iñapari is a critically endangered Indigenous South American language spoken by just four people in Peru along the Las Piedras river near the mouth of the Sabaluyoq river. The language is already extinct in neighboring Bolivia. All five remaining speakers are bilingual in Spanish and none of their children and grandchildren speak the language, which will likely lead to its extinction once the speakers die. The Iñapari language currently has a published dictionary.

The Pacaguara (Pacahuara) dialect described by Mercier was at least ethnically distinct. (But see Pacaguara language.)

== Phonology ==
According to Parker, Iñapari has eleven consonants and six vowels.

Iñapari Consonants
	Bilabial	Alveolar	Palatal	Glottal
Nasals	m	n		
Plosives	p	t		ʔ
Fricatives		s		h
Liquids		(l) ~ ɾ		
Glides	w		j	

The status of the lateral as a phoneme is considered dubious as [l] is found in few words and may be a phonetic variant of /r/.

Iñapari's six vowels are /i e a ï o u/, where /ï/ is a high back unrounded vowel.

== Grammar ==
=== Nouns ===
The only two features associated with nominals are gender and possession.

Nouns are divided into two genders: masculine and feminine. Animate nouns can also take a neutral gender when the actual gender is irrelevant to the utterance.

Possession is marked by prefixes and follows the inherent/non-inherent strategy.

=== Adjectives ===
It is unclear whether Iñapari has a distinct category of adjectives. Adjectives agree in gender with nominal heads and always follow them.

=== Numerals ===
Only 20 cardinal numbers and 2 ordinal numbers are attested. The available data suggest that the number system derives cardinal numbers from body parts.

=== Verbs ===
Verbs agree with subjects and objects through pronominal prefixes and suffixes, respectively. Suffixes also indicate volitional and non-volitional causation.
