= Las Piedras River =

Coordinates: 11.0667°S 71.7667°W

Las Piedras River Río Tacuatimanu
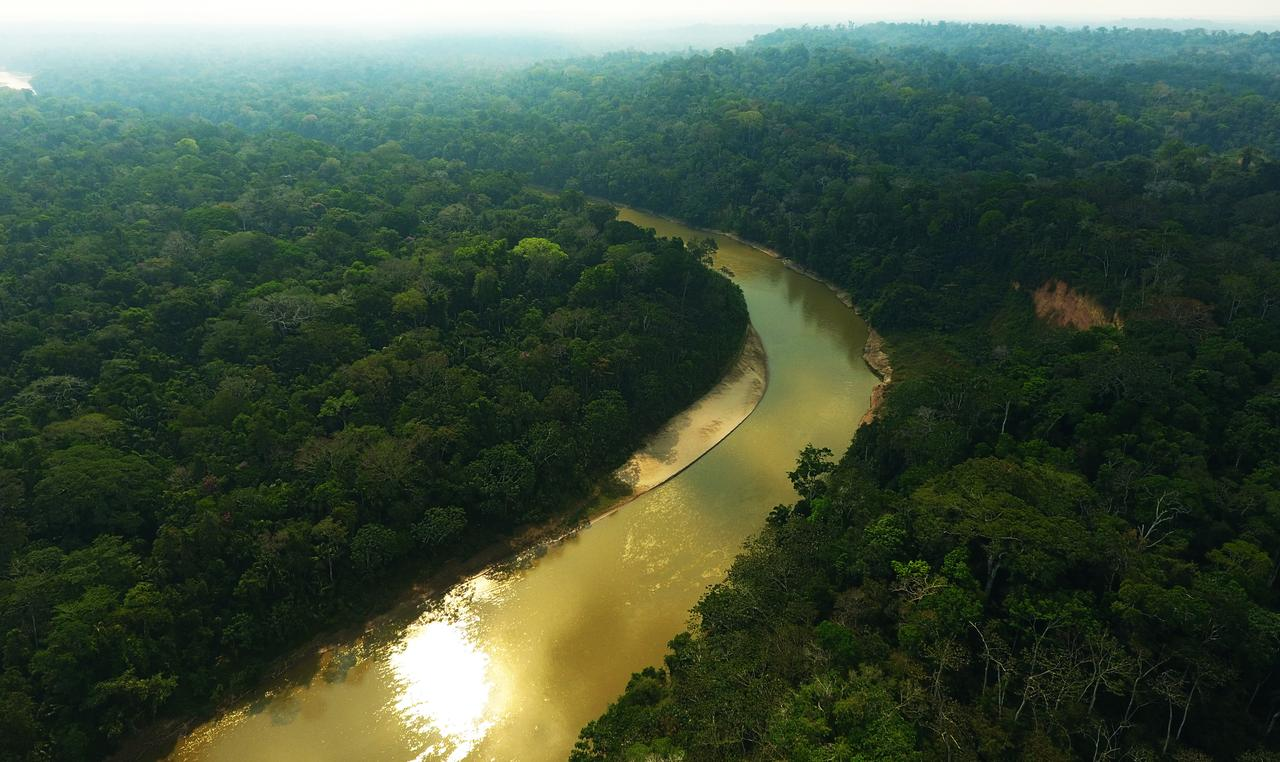
- Drone photo from lower Las Piedras River

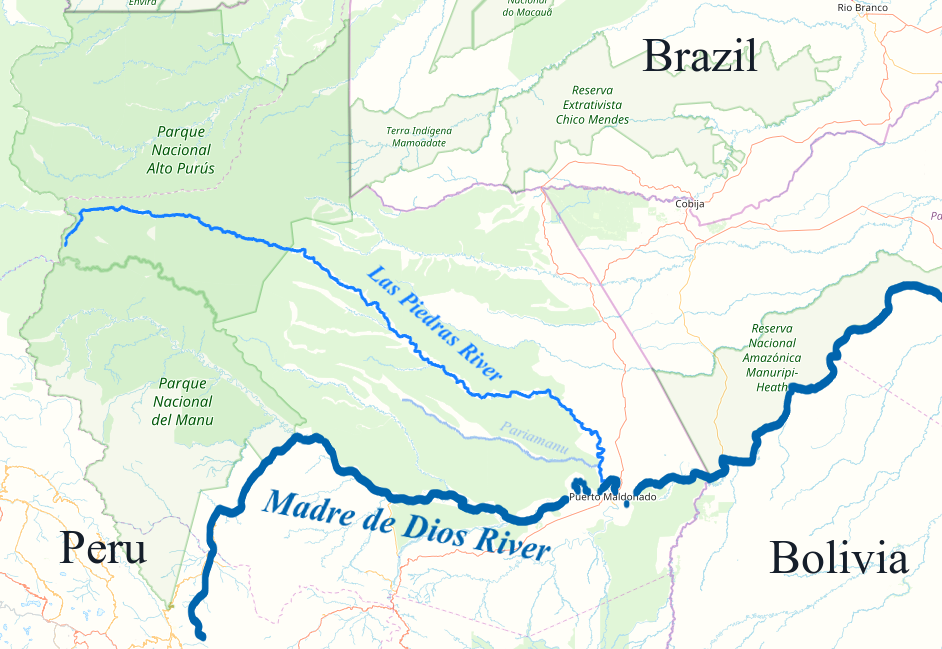

Location
- Country: Peru

Physical characteristics
- Mouth: Madre de Dios River
- Length: 640 km (400 mi)

The Las Piedras River (the "River of Stones") is a major tributary of the Madre de Dios River in the southeast Peruvian Amazon.

== Geography of the Piedras Region ==
The Las Piedras River is located in the department of Madre de Dios, which is the official capital of biodiversity in Peru, and is part of the Tropical Andes Biodiversity Hotspot. The Tropical Andes Biodiversity Hotspot contains the largest percentage of endemic plants and animals in the world. The Piedras is the longest tributary of the 1,347 km long Madre de Dios River and more than 99 percent of its drainage is in the Amazon lowlands, below 400 meters. The capital of the Las Piedras District is the town of Planchón, which is located in the province Tambopata in the Madre de Dios Department

Large portions of the headwaters of the Piedras River are protected by Alto Purus National Park. Below Alto Purus on the Piedras River is the Reserva Territorial Madre de Dios, which is the official territory of Masco-Piro indigenous people, who have been living in voluntary isolation since at least the time of the rubber boom that began in the 1860s. Downriver from the Reserva Territorial Madre de Dios are commercial timber concessions and the indigenous territories of Monte Salvado and Puerto Nuevo. Below the timber concessions and indigenous communities are Brazil nut concessions and several small indigenous and mestizo communities, including the mestizo communities of Lucerna and Sabaluyoc. In this part of the Piedras River watershed, there are also several large private conservation-oriented concessions, including the Junglekeepers concession (20,234 hectares or 50,000 acres), which is a Peru-based non-profit, the Las Piedras Amazon Center (LPAC) (4,460 hectares or 11,000 acres), run by the Peruvian nonprofit ARCAmazon, the Arbio concession, run by Arbio Peru and land protected by Hoja Nueva, which is a US-based nonprofit.

== History of the Piedras Region ==
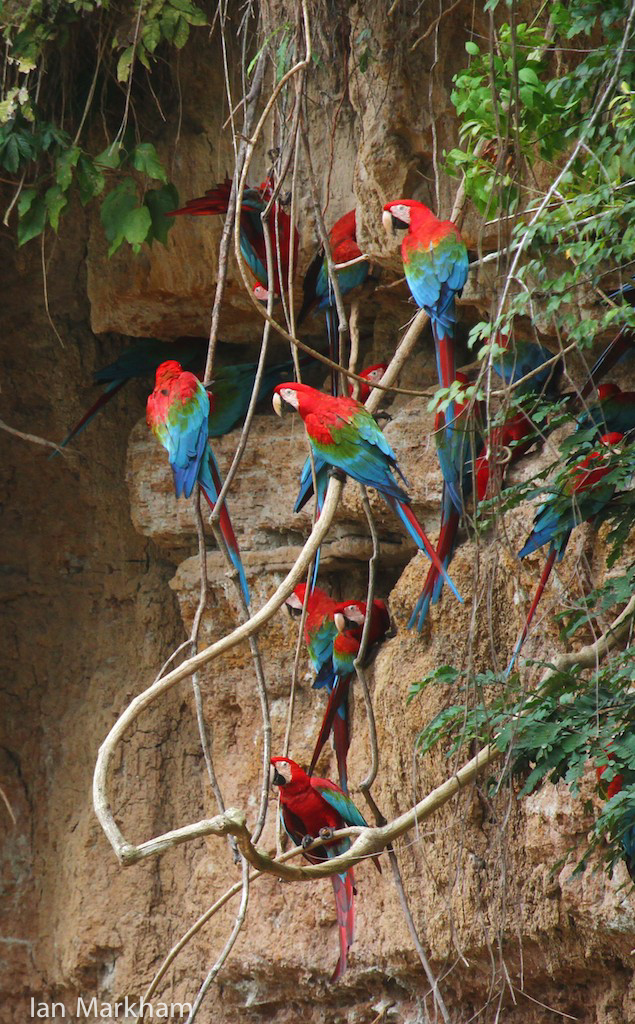
Scarlet macaws (Ara macao) at a clay lick

The original indigenous name of the Piedras River is “Tacuatimanu”. Indigenous communities in the region include the Masco-Piro, Amahuaca and the Yine. In the first of many expeditions exploring the Piedras River, Father Pío Aza lead a group in 1911 to locate local indigenous groups and settle them in Christian missions. The Masco-Piro and Amahuaca were exploited and enslaved by rubber barons starting during the rubber boom. The rubber boom arrived in the Las Piedras in 1894 after large concentrations of high-quality rubber were found. One of the most notable rubber barons in the Las Piedras area, was Carlos Scharff, who enslaved and exploited the local native populations to extract latex. Members of the Masco-Piro living in voluntary isolation today are thought to be related to members of the Masco-Piro groups who fled local rubber barons before enslavement or after they attacked the rubber barons for being mistreated and later fled into the forests to avoid persecution.

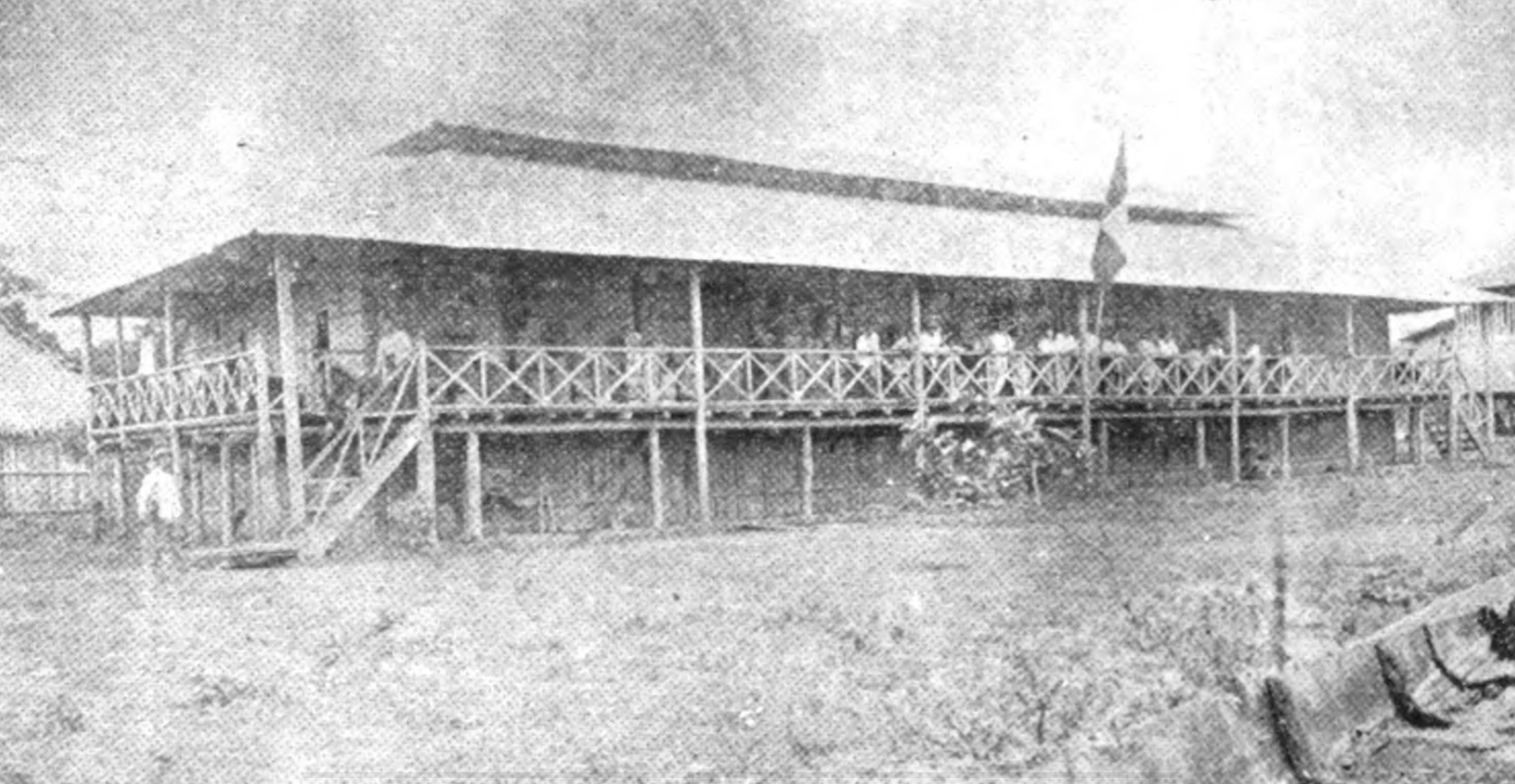
The principal house of Maximo Rodriguez along the Madre de Dios and Los Piedras River, circa 1911.

The Masco-Piro language is part of the Arawak and the Amahuaca is part of the Pano linguistic family. The Masco-Piro live on the tributaries of the Manu, Los Amigos, Las Piedras, and Tahuamanu Rivers (Castillo 2004). These semi-nomadic groups are believed to move seasonally between the headwaters of the Manu, Alto Púrus, and Las Piedras rivers. The Amahuca live in the community of Boca Pariamanu and in communities in isolation in the upper Piedras River. The Yine live in the Monte Savado indigenous territory, which is on the border of the Reserva Territorial Madre de Dios. The Yine of Monte Salvado arrived from the Urubamba region of Peru around 1994. Members of the indigenous community of Monte Salvado and the nearby Puerto Nuevo were evacuated by the federal government in 2013 following the appearance of 200 armed indigenous men who raided the village. The raiders took blankets, machetes, rope, and food. It remains unclear what provoked the attack, but various proposals have been put forward, including increasing threats by drug traffickers and loggers and unusually cold weather related to recent climate change.

The rubber boom in the Las Piedras River ended around 1912, but in recent decades the Las Piedras has been host to other forms of resource extraction, including oil prospecting, several timber booms, and the paving of the nearby Interoceanic Highway. In 1996, the Mobil Oil was granted a 1,500,0000 ha concession to prospect for oil. The company eventually pulled out of the region after insufficient quantities of oil were found. Logging of tropical hardwoods, particularly cedar and mahogany, has been a local commercial industry since the 1970s. The largest logging boom occurred in the 1990s due indirectly to international demand for mahogany and tropical cedar. In 2002, a study estimated there were 231 logging camps in the Piedras watershed with about 2,000 loggers operating in the area. At the time, researchers recorded more than $5 million USD worth of wood traveling to the local market in Puerto Maldonado and that in one month the logging camps on the Piedras River consumed more than 2,000 mammals and more than 2,000 birds. They also estimated the monthly harvest of bushmeat during this period was around 41,000 kg. During the logging boom of the 1990s and early 2000s, there were increased reports of loggers encountering uncontacted indigenous people, with 17% of loggers interviewed reporting contact with indigenous people living in voluntary isolation.

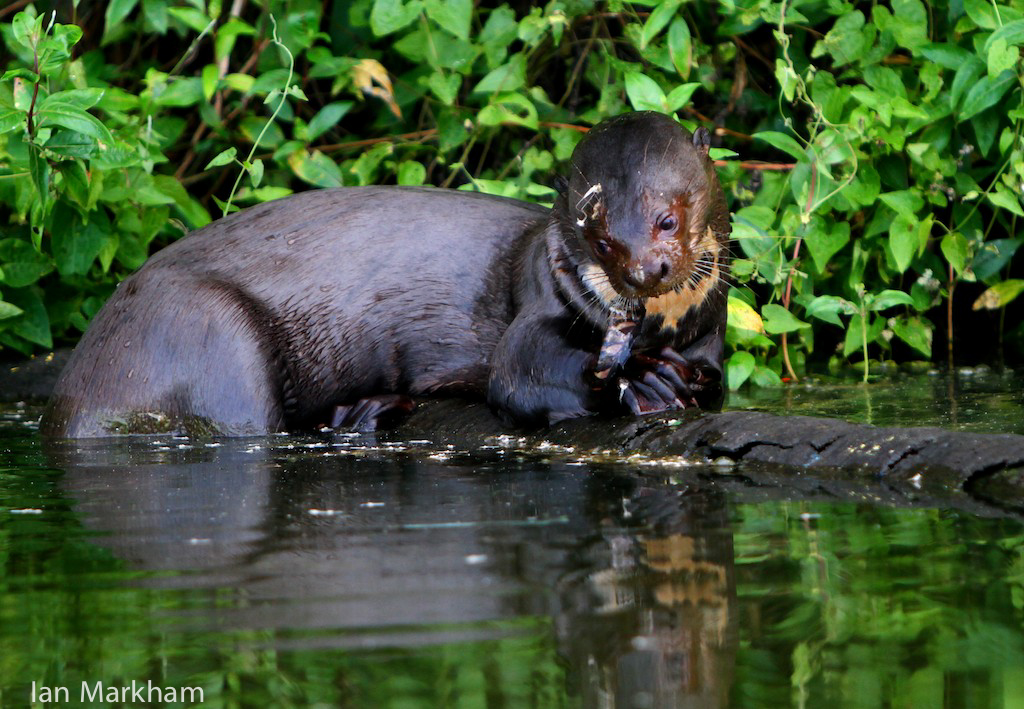
Giant river otter (Pteronura brasiliensis)

== Recent land-use changes in the Middle Piedras River ==
More recently, the paving of the Interoceanic Highway has put increased pressure on the forests, wildlife, and indigenous communities of the Piedras region. The Interoceanic Highway was a $2.8 billion (USD) project that upgraded more than 20 bridges and thousands of kilometers of highway. These improvements now enable continuous road travel and the shipment of goods overland between ports in Brazil and ports in Peru. The full effects of the highway have not yet been experienced, because the highway was only completed in 2011, but portions of the lower and middle Las Piedras are now under increased threat of deforestation. This conclusion is based on the fact that across the border in Acre, Brazil the paved highway affects the forests 45 km from the highway and there are points where the lower and middle Piedras are within 30 km of the highway. In addition to logging, agriculture and ecotourism, Brazil nuts are a major industry in the Piedras watershed. Recent changes to forestry laws are thought to be affecting the increased amount of wood being harvested in Brazil nut concessions in Madre de Dios.

Since 2013, the ecotourism concessions near the Las Piedras Amazon Center (LPAC) continue to experience deforestation, but LPAC has remained unaffected thanks to the efforts of the Peruvian NGO ARCAmazon. The main threat to the forests around LPAC and the nearby community of Lucerna is forest clearing for cacao and cattle. Since 2013, 605 hectares (1,490 acres) have been cleared, including 134 hectares (330 acres) in 2017.

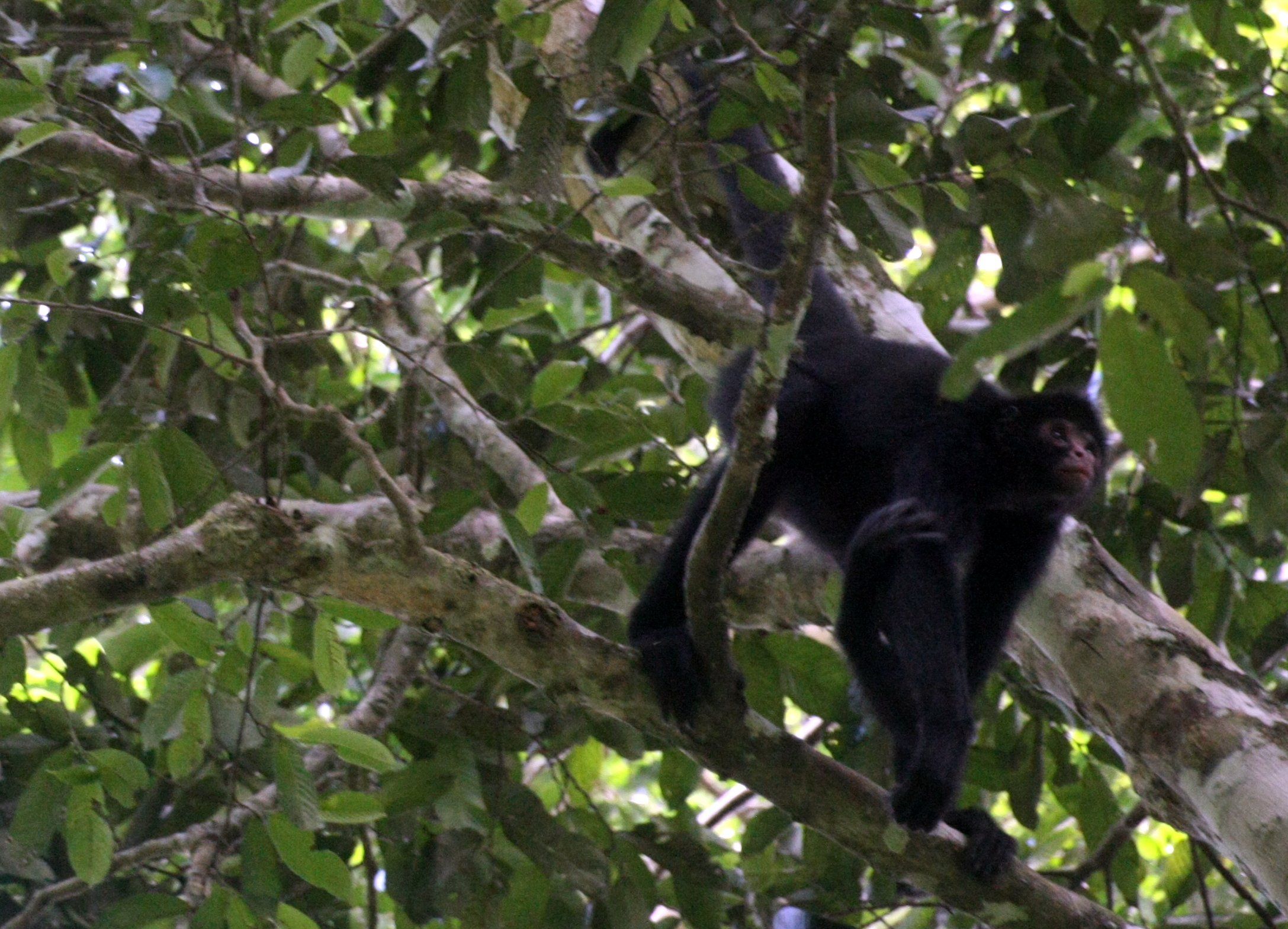
Peruvian spider monkey (Ateles chamek)

== Flora and fauna ==
The Las Piedras watershed is home to many different animal and plant species. Among these are the endangered Peruvian spider monkey and giant river otter. Giant anteaters, jaguars, ocelots also have been spotted within the watershed.

The river is also home to clay licks, where birds and animals gather to consume sodium and other minerals.

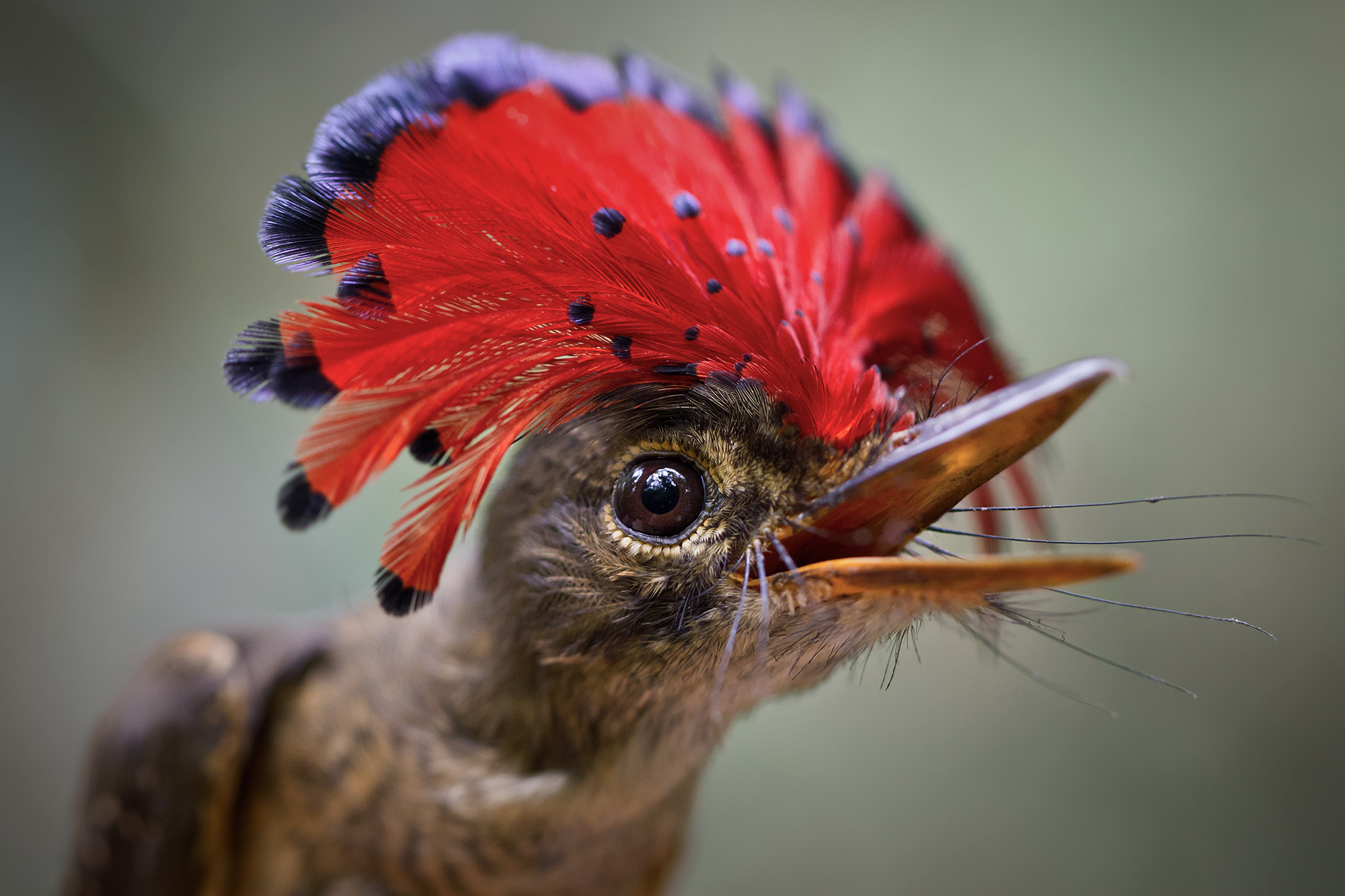
Amazonian royal flycatcher (Onychorhynchus coronatus)

== Tributaries of the Piedras River ==
· Ceticayo

· Chanchamayo

· Curiacu

· Huasca

· Panguana

· Pingachari

· Pumayacu

· Ronsoco

· Ronsoquito

· San Francisco

· Panguamayo

· Shahuana

· India

· Boleo

· Pariamanu

== Representation in media ==
The river is the subject of a memoir by conservationist and explorer Paul Rosolie, Mother of God: An Extraordinary Journey into the Uncharted Tributaries of the Western Amazon (2014).
