= Voiceless palatal affricate =

Consonantal sound represented by ⟨cç⟩ in IPA

cç
- IPA number: 107 (138)

Audio sample
- source · help

Encoding
- Entity (decimal): &#99;&#865;&#231;
- Unicode (hex): U+0063 U+0361 U+00E7
- X-SAMPA: c_C
Image

A voiceless palatal affricate is a type of consonantal sound, used in some spoken languages. The symbols in the International Phonetic Alphabet that represent this sound are ⟨c͡ç⟩ and ⟨c͜ç⟩. The tie bar may be omitted, yielding ⟨cç⟩. This affricate also has an affricate ligature ⟨⟩, which is not in Unicode.

This sound is the non-sibilant equivalent of the voiceless alveolo-palatal affricate.

A voiceless palatal affricate occurs in such languages as Hungarian and Skolt Sami, among others. The consonant is quite rare; it is mostly absent from Europe (with the Uralic languages and Albanian being exceptions). It usually occurs with its voiced counterpart, the voiced palatal affricate.

== Features ==
Features of a voiceless palatal affricate:

- Its manner of articulation is affricate, which means it is produced by first stopping the airflow entirely, then allowing air flow through a constricted channel at the place of articulation, causing turbulence. It is not a sibilant.
- Its place of articulation is palatal, which means it is articulated with the middle or back part of the tongue raised to the hard palate.
- Its phonation is voiceless, which means it is produced without vibrations of the vocal cords. In some languages the vocal cords are actively separated, so it is always voiceless; in others the cords are lax, so that it may take on the voicing of adjacent sounds.
- It is an oral consonant, which means that air is not allowed to escape through the nose.
- It is a median consonant, which means it is produced by directing the airstream down the midline of the tongue, rather than to the sides.
- Its airstream mechanism is pulmonic, which means it is articulated by pushing air only with the intercostal muscles and abdominal muscles, as in most speech sounds.

== Occurrence ==
=== Palatal ===
Language		Word	IPA	Meaning	Notes
Altai	Northern Altai	чок / çok	[c͡ço̞k̠(x̠)]	'no'	
Albanian	Standard	qaj	[c͡çaj]	'I cry'	May merge with [t͡ʃ] in some dialects. Retained as [c] in some Tosk Albanian varieties, or alternatively [c͡ç]. See Albanian language
Asturian	Western dialects	muyyer	[muˈc͡çeɾ]	'woman'	Alternate evolution of -lj-, -c'l-, pl-, cl- and fl- in the Brañas Vaqueiras area of Western Asturias. May be also realized as [c] or [ɟ͡ʝ]
Kaingang		soinh	[c͡çɔi̯ɟ]	'cranefly'	Possible word-initial realization of /ç/.
Greek	Some dialects	όχι / óchi	[ˈoc͡çi]	'no'	Allophone of /x/ before front vowels. See Modern Greek phonology
Korean		위키백과 / Wikibaekkwa	[yc͡çíβ̞e̞k̚k͈wà̠]	'Wikipedia'	Allophone of /kʰ/ before /i/ and /j/. See Korean phonology
Makassarese		pacce	[ˈpʰac.c͡çɛ]	'empathic pain'	Allophone of /c/.
Norman language	Central dialects	tcheure / tchuure	[c͡çøʁ]	'cook'	Allophone of /c/.
Navajo		ashkii	[aʃc͡çiː]	'boy'	Allophone of /kʰ/ before the front vowels /i, e/. See Navajo phonology
Norwegian	Central and Western dialects	ikkje	[ic͡çə]	'not'	See Norwegian phonology
Skolt Sami		sääˊmǩiõll	[ɕa̟ːmʰʲc͡çjɘlː]	'Skolt Sami'	
Yakut		чэй / çey	[c͡çe̞j]	'tea'	
Yine		nchanixika	[nt͡ʃanic͡çika]	'I am invited'	May be /c/ instead.

=== Post-palatal ===
Voiceless post-palatal or pre-velar affricate

c̠ç̠

k̟x̟

There is also a voiceless post-palatal or pre-velar affricate, which is articulated slightly more back compared with the place of articulation of the prototypical voiceless palatal affricate, though not as back as the prototypical voiceless velar affricate. The International Phonetic Alphabet does not have a separate symbol for that sound, though it can be transcribed as ⟨c̠͡ç̠⟩, ⟨c͡ç˗⟩ (both symbols denote a retracted ⟨c͡ç⟩), ⟨k̟͡x̟⟩ (advanced ⟨k͡x⟩), ⟨k͡xʲ⟩ or ⟨k͜xʲ⟩ (palatalized ⟨k͡x⟩/⟨k͜x⟩, though this is more ambiguous than the others; see below).

Language	Word	IPA	Meaning	Notes
Dutch	koekje	[ˈkuc̠͡ç̠jø̜]	'biscuit' (dim.)	Post-palatal; allophone of /k/ before /j/. See Dutch phonology

== See also ==
- Index of phonetics articles

== Notes ==
Place →	Labial					Coronal										Dorsal					Laryngeal			
Manner ↓	Bilabial		Labiodental		Linguolabial		Dental		Alveolar		Postalveolar		Retroflex		(Alveolo-)palatal		Velar		Uvular		Pharyngeal/epiglottal		Glottal	
Nasal	m̥	m	ɱ̊	ɱ		n̼	n̪̊	n̪	n̥	n	n̠̊	n̠	ɳ̊	ɳ	ɲ̊	ɲ	ŋ̊	ŋ	ɴ̥	ɴ				
Plosive	p	b	p̪	b̪	t̼	d̼	t̪	d̪	t	d			ʈ	ɖ	c	ɟ	k	ɡ	q	ɢ	ʡ		ʔ	
Sibilant affricate							t̪s̪	d̪z̪	ts	dz	t̠ʃ	d̠ʒ	tʂ	dʐ	tɕ	dʑ								
Non-sibilant affricate	pɸ	bβ	p̪f	b̪v			t̪θ	d̪ð	tɹ̝̊	dɹ̝	t̠ɹ̠̊˔	d̠ɹ̠˔			cç	ɟʝ	kx	ɡɣ	qχ	ɢʁ	ʡʜ	ʡʢ	ʔh	
Sibilant fricative							s̪	z̪	s	z	ʃ	ʒ	ʂ	ʐ	ɕ	ʑ								
Non-sibilant fricative	ɸ	β	f	v	θ̼	ð̼	θ	ð	θ̠	ð̠	ɹ̠̊˔	ɹ̠˔	ɻ̊˔	ɻ˔	ç	ʝ	x	ɣ	χ	ʁ	ħ	ʕ	h	ɦ
Approximant		β̞		ʋ				ð̞		ɹ		ɹ̠		ɻ		j		ɰ						˷
Tap/flap		ⱱ̟		ⱱ					ɾ̥	ɾ			ɽ̊	ɽ						ɢ̆		ʡ̆		
Trill	ʙ̥	ʙ							r̥	r		r̠	ɽ̊r̥	ɽr					ʀ̥	ʀ	ʜ	ʢ		
Lateral affricate									tɬ	dɮ			tꞎ	d𝼅	c𝼆	ɟʎ̝	k𝼄	ɡʟ̝						
Lateral fricative							ɬ̪		ɬ	ɮ			ꞎ	𝼅	𝼆	ʎ̝	𝼄	ʟ̝						
Lateral approximant								l̪	l̥	l		l̠	ɭ̊	ɭ	ʎ̥	ʎ	ʟ̥	ʟ		ʟ̠				
Lateral tap/flap									ɺ̥	ɺ			𝼈̊	𝼈		ʎ̆		ʟ̆						

		BL	LD	D	A	PA	RF	P	V	U
Implosive	Voiced	ɓ			ɗ		ᶑ	ʄ	ɠ	ʛ
Implosive	Voiceless	ɓ̥			ɗ̥		ᶑ̊	ʄ̊	ɠ̊	ʛ̥
Ejective	Stop	pʼ			tʼ		ʈʼ	cʼ	kʼ	qʼ
Ejective	Affricate		p̪fʼ	tθʼ	tsʼ	tʃʼ	tʂʼ	tɕʼ	kxʼ	qχʼ
Ejective	Fricative	ɸʼ	fʼ	θʼ	sʼ	ʃʼ	ʂʼ	ɕʼ	xʼ	χʼ
Ejective	Lateral affricate				tɬʼ			c𝼆ʼ	k𝼄ʼ	q𝼄ʼ
Ejective	Lateral fricative				ɬʼ					
Click (top: velar; bottom: uvular)	Tenuis	kʘ qʘ		kǀ qǀ	kǃ qǃ		k𝼊 q𝼊	kǂ qǂ		
Click (top: velar; bottom: uvular)	Voiced	ɡʘ ɢʘ		ɡǀ ɢǀ	ɡǃ ɢǃ		ɡ𝼊 ɢ𝼊	ɡǂ ɢǂ		
Click (top: velar; bottom: uvular)	Nasal	ŋʘ ɴʘ		ŋǀ ɴǀ	ŋǃ ɴǃ		ŋ𝼊 ɴ𝼊	ŋǂ ɴǂ	ʞ	
Click (top: velar; bottom: uvular)	Tenuis lateral				kǁ qǁ					
Click (top: velar; bottom: uvular)	Voiced lateral				ɡǁ ɢǁ					
Click (top: velar; bottom: uvular)	Nasal lateral				ŋǁ ɴǁ					
