= Purus languages =

Arawakan languages of Peru and Brazil

Piro
- Purus
- Geographic distribution: Purus River, Western Amazon
- Linguistic classification: Arawakan: Southern; Piro

Language codes
- Glottolog: puru1265

The Piro languages, a.k.a. Purus, or in Aikhenvald South-Western Arawak, are Arawakan languages of the Peruvian and western Brazilian Amazon.

== Languages ==
Kaufman (1994) gives the following breakdown:

- Piro
  - Piro (Yine, Machinere)
    - Mashco Piro a.k.a. Cujareño
  - Iñapari
  - Kanamaré †
  - Apurinã

Kaufman had considered the last to be a dialect of Piro; Aikhenvald suggests it may have been a dialect of Iñapari.
