= Yanesha =

Yanesha may refer to:

- Yanesha people, an indigenous people of Peru
- Yanesha language, their language
- Yanesha Communal Reservation
