= Asháninka (disambiguation) =

The Asháninka are an indigenous people of Peru and the Acre State of Brazil.

Asháninka may also refer to:

- Asháninka language
- Asháninka, or Axininca language
