= Nanti language =

Arawakan language spoken in Peru

Nanti
- Cogapacorill, Pucapucari
- Nanti
- Native to: Peru
- Native speakers: 94 (2007)
- Language family: Arawakan: Southern; Campa; Machiguenga; Nanti

Language codes
- ISO 639-3: cox
- Glottolog: nant1250
- ELP: Nanti

Nanti is an Arawakan language spoken by approximately 250 people in southeastern Peruvian Amazonia, principally in a number of small communities located near the headwaters of the Camisea and Timpía Rivers. It belongs to the Kampan branch of the Arawak family, and is most closely related to Matsigenka, with which it is partially mutually intelligible.

The language is also sometimes called Kogapakori (variants: Cogapacori, Kugapakori), a pejorative term of Matsigenka origin meaning 'violent person'.

== Classification ==
Nanti is a member of the Arawakan language family, specifically in the Kampa branch. Despite the fact that the Kampa languages' internal classification is unclear, six language varieties are distinguished; Nanti, Asháninka, Ashéninka, Kakinte, Matsigenka, and Nomatsiguenga.

== Phonology ==
=== Consonants ===
The phonemic inventory of Nanti is typical of the Kampa languages and of the Arawakan family as a whole, although there are some differences. Nanti's system of allophony is a distinguishing feature of the language.

		Labial	Alveolar	Alveo- palatal	Velar	Glottal	Unspecified
Stop	voiceless	p	t	tʲ	k		
Stop	voiced	b			g		
Affricate			t͡s	t͡ʃ			
Fricative			s	ʃ		h	
Flap			ɾ	ɾʲ			
Nasal		m	n	ɲ			N (Note: This segment is realized variously as [m n ŋ] depending on the consonants that follow it. Lev Michael interprets it as a unique phoneme rather than an assimilating nasal due to certain phonological processes.)
Glide				j			

Nanti exhibits a lack of symmetry in the stop series; while there is a voiceless /t/, there is no equivalent voiced /d/. This asymmetry is common among the Kampa languages.

=== Vowels ===
Nanti has a vowel inventory typical for the Arawakan languages except for the diphthong /ɯi̯/, which Michael argues is monomoraic.

	Front	Central	Back
High	i iː		ɯi̯
Mid	e eː		o oː
Low		a aː	

=== Stress ===
Nanti stress is based on the sonority or prominence of a syllable nucleus, rather than on position, which is typologically very unusual.

== Typology ==
Typologically, Nanti is a "highly" polysynthetic language and exhibits agglutinativity. Its verbal morphology is extremely complicated; in particular, its applicative suffixing system "has been described as one of the most complex of any human language", though the other word classes have much simpler morphology.

== Bibliography ==
- Crowhurst, Megan; Michael, Lev (2005). "Iterative footing and prominence-driven stress in Nanti (Kampa)". Language. 81 (1): 47–95.
- Michael, Lev (2008). Nanti evidential practice: Language, Knowledge, and Social Action in an Amazonian society (PhD thesis). University of Texas at Austin. hdl:11858/00-001M-0000-0012-95C3-C.
- Michael, Lev (2012a). "Nanti self-quotation: Implications for the pragmatics of reported speech and evidentiality". Pragmatics and Society. 3 (2): 321–357.
- Michael, Lev (2012b). "Possession in Nanti". In Aikhenvald, Alexandra; Dixon, R. M. W. (eds.). Possession and Ownership: A cross-linguistic typology. pp. 149–166.
- Michael, Lev (2005). "El estatus sintáctico de los marcadores de persona en el idioma Nanti (Campa, Arawak)". Lengua y Sociedad (in Spanish). 7 (2): 21–32.
