= Amuesha =

Amuesha, Amoesha, and Yanesha' may refer to:

- The Yanesha' people of Peru
- The Yanesha' language, spoken by the Yanesha' people
