= Interethnic Association for the Development of the Peruvian Rainforest =

Indigenous rights organisation in Peru

- Asociación Interétnica de Desarrollo de la Selva Peruana
- Abbreviation: AIDESEP
- Purpose: Indigenous rights
- Location: Peru
- President: Jorge Pérez Rubio
- Affiliations: COICA
- Award: Right Livelihood Award
- Website: aidesep.org.pe

The Interethnic Association for the Development of the Peruvian Rainforest (Spanish: Asociación Interétnica de Desarrollo de la Selva Peruana, AIDESEP) is a Peruvian national Indigenous rights organization. A National Board of Directors is elected by nine regional organizations every five years. The organization comprises 109 federations, representing 2,439 communities of roughly 650,000 Indigenous people who speak a plurality of languages.

Members of AIDESEP work to improve the health, education, housing, and organization of Indigenous peoples.

Since 2021 its president is Jorge Pérez Rubio who succeeded Lizardo Cauper Pezo, Henderson Rengifo Hualinga, and Alberto Pizango.

AIDESEP is a member organization of the Coordinator of Indigenous Organizations of the Amazon River Basin (COICA).

== Members ==
AIDESEP was founded by:

- Consejo Aguaruna-Huambisa (CAH), representing the Aguaruna and Huambisa people of the Amazonas region
- Asociación de Comunidades Asháninkas del valle de Pichis (ACONAP), representing the Asháninka people of Pichis Valley in the Pasco Region
- Federación de Comunidades Nativas del Ucayali (FECONAU), Ucayali Region
- Federación Nativa de Madre de Dios (FENAMAD), representing the Indigenous peoples of the Madre de Dios Region
- Mashco-Piro people of the Ucayali Region
- Amuesha people of the Pasco Region
- Matsés people of the Loreto Region

== Board of Directors ==
The leadership of AIDESEP for the period 2021-2026 is composed by:

- President: Jorge Pérez Rubio (Murui-Muinani people).
- Vice-President: Miguel Guimaraes (Shipibo people - Ucayali)
- Secretary: Tabea Casique (Asheninka people)
- Treasurer: Julio Cusirichi (Shipibo people)
- First Member: Teresita Antazú (Yanesha people).
- Second Member: Nelsith Sangama (Kichwa people)

== See also ==
- Indigenous peoples in Peru
- 2009 Peruvian political crisis
