= Yanesha' =

Yanesha' may refer to:

- the Yanesha' people
- the Yanesha' language
