= Ucayali–Yurúa Ashéninka =

Arawakan language

Ashéninka Ucayali-Yurúa
- Native to: Peru, Brazil
- Native speakers: (7,000 cited 2001)
- Language family: Arawakan: Southern; Campa; Ashéninka; Ashéninka Ucayali-Yurúa

Language codes
- ISO 639-3: cpb
- Glottolog: ucay1237

Ashéninka Ucayali-Yurúa is an indigenous American language spoken along Peru's Ucayali and Yurúa river by 7,000 people and also 212 people in the Brazilian state of Acre. There is a 15% literacy rate, it is an official language of Peru in the area where it is the dominant language. A dictionary and grammar have been developed.
