= Matsigenka people =

Indigenous people in Peru

Matsigenka
(Machiguenga)
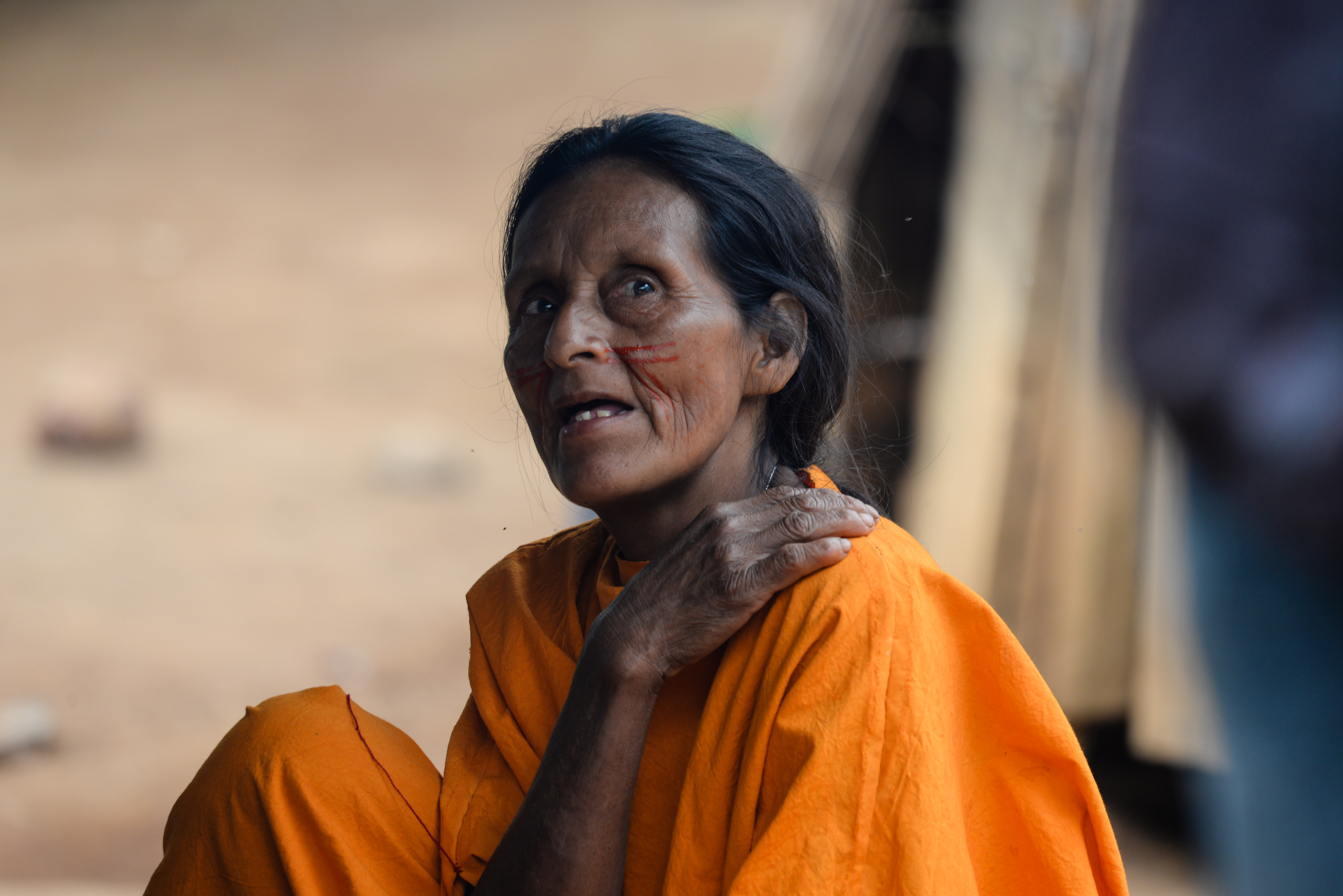
- A Matsigenka woman dressed in traditional garb, in the Pangoa District of Peru.

Total population
- ~18,000 (2020)

Regions with significant populations
- Peru

Languages
- Matsigenka language

Religion
- Christianity (Catholicism), animism

The Matsigenka (also Machiguenga, Matsigenga) are an indigenous people who live in the high jungle, or montaña, area on the eastern slopes of the Andes and in the Amazon Basin jungle regions of southeastern Peru. Their population in 2020 amounted to about 18,000. Formerly they were hunter-gatherers but today the majority are sedentary swidden cultivators. The main crops grown are manioc, maize, and bananas, but today commercial crops such as coffee and cacao are increasingly important. Their main source of protein used to be peccary and monkeys but today fish has become more important as game animals have become increasingly scarce as a consequence of the encroachment from highland immigrants to the area and the exploitation of the Camisea gas finds. The Machiguenga people have a preference for self-sufficiency when it comes to cultivating essential crops, made possible by their generous land allocation per capita, and the lack of conflict in their area.

== Culture ==
Most Matsigenka do not have personal names. Members of the same band are identified by kin terminology, while members of a different band or tribe are referred to by their Spanish names.

Most Matsigenka are today Christian (mainly Catholic) but commonly they still follow animist beliefs. Spirits and demons influence everyday life whereas the creator gods have withdrawn and are indifferent to humans. Shamans used to play a prominent role in local society, today though they are less visible and certain of their functions have been taken over by healers.

While quite accomplished in using plants and herbs as medicine, the Matsigenka are susceptible to new infectious diseases brought in from the outside world. In many communities they have, however, been spared from COVID-19. The Matsigenka used to wear a handwoven and homemade cotton tunic made by women, in local Spanish called a cushmas, designed with a V neck for men, and straight neck for women. They fashion huts using palm tree poles as a frame, with palm leaves thatched for the roof. Literacy rates for settled groups range from 30% to 60%. Each extended family group is governed by a self-appointed "headman".

== Family life ==
Formerly women married around the age of 16, while today they commonly enter into family relations some years later. Women have an average of eight to ten pregnancies. As with many indigenous tribes, the mortality rate for infants is high. During the first year(s) of marriage the relation is often unstable and separation is common. The Matsigenka are uxorilocal, which means that the man moves to his wife who usually still lives with her parents. During the early time of their relation they prepare their own garden and they build their own house not far from the woman's parents. This means that the relations between mothers and daughters are strong while the position of inmarrying men, who come from other family constellations, may be experienced as vulnerable. Formerly, prominent men had multiple wives.

== Language ==
The Matsigenka language belongs to the Campa group of Machi puceran Maipurean (Arawakan) language family, which is spoken by approximately 12,000 people in Peru. There are several dialects of Matsigenka: that of the Upper Urubamba, of the Lower Urubamba, of the Manu area (Matsigenka proper) and what some refer to as Nanti and consider a distinct language but which the Matsigenka see as a variety of their language.

== See also ==
- Antisuyu
- Ashaninka
- Harakmbut
- Shipibo
- Yanesha
