= Axininca language =

Arawakan language spoken in Peru

Axininca
- Ajyéninka
- Pronunciation: [aˈçiniŋka]
- Native to: Peru
- Native speakers: (4,000 cited 2000)
- Language family: Arawakan: Southern; Campa (Pre-Andine); Axininca

Language codes
- ISO 639-3: cpc
- Glottolog: ajyi1238
- Linguasphere: 82-BBA-ai

Axininca (also "Axininca Campa", (Note: The name Campa is offensive.) Ajyíninka Apurucayali, Campa, Ashaninca, Ashéninca Apurucayali, Apurucayali Campa, Ajyéninka) is an Arawakan language of the Ashéninka dialect group spoken along the Apurucayali tributary of the Pachitea River in Peru.

It has figured prominently in formal linguistic theory involving phonology (especially prosody including its stress) and morphology (Black 1991; Casali 1996, 2011; De Lacy 2002, 2006; De Lacy & Kingston 2013; Itô 1986, 1989; Levin 1985; Lombardi 2002; McCarthy & Prince 1993; Morley 2015; Rosenthall & Horn 1997; Spring 1990a, 1990b, 1990c, 1992; Yip 1983).

== Demographics and language policy ==
There is 20% literacy in Ajyíninka Apurucayali and 30% literacy in Spanish; there was 40 to 50% bilingualism between the two as of 1981.

== Classification ==
Axininca is a member of the Campa languages. Major clasifications of languages have unanimously classified the Campa languages as Arawakan. Axininca itself is closest to the Ucayali varietry of Ashéninka.

== Geographical distribution ==
Axininca is spoken in the Apurucayali River and its respective tributaries, as well as potentially on the Arruya River.

== History ==
=== Documentation ===
The first documentation of Axininca includes a wordlist published in 1973 by Heitzman, who collected data from Puerto Davis alng the Apurucayali River. Anderson's (1976) account of a surver trip lasting a week, also on the Apurucayali, contains a number of impressions on Axininca, including a basic comparison to other Asheninca varieties.

== Phonology ==
=== Consonants ===
Payne (1981) describes the following Axininca consonant inventory:

		Bilabial	Apical	Postalveolar/ Palatal	Velar	Glottal
Plosives	unaspirated	p	t		k	
Plosives	aspirated		tʰ			
Affricates	unaspirated		ts	tʃ		
Affricates	aspirated		tsʰ	tʃʰ		
Fricatives			s	ç		h
Liquids			r	rʲ		
Nasals		m	n	ɲ		
Glides		β̞		j	ɰ	
Unspecified nasal			N			

=== Vowels ===
Axininca has three phonemic vowels:

	Front	Back	
	Front	unrounded	rounded
High	i		
Mid			o
Low		a	

== Morphology ==
Axininca distinguishes five parts of speech, being verbs, nouns, adverbs, adjectives, and pronouns. However, pronouns and adverbs, as well as adjectives and nouns, are morphologically identical to each other. Verb stems cannot occur isolated. Nouns and adjectives may be suffixed for possession. Adverbs and pronouns can occur in isolation, but cannot take possessive affixes.

== Bibliography ==
- Black, H Andrew. (1991). The phonology of the velar glide in Axininca Campa. Phonology, 8, 183–217.
- Casali, Roderic F. (1996). Resolving hiatus. Doctoral dissertation, University of California Los Angeles.
- Casali, Roderic F. (2011). Hiatus resolution. In Marc Van Oostendorp, Colin J. Ewen, Elizabeth V. Hume, and Keren Rice (Eds.), The Blackwell companion to phonology. Malden, MA: Blackwell.
- De Lacy, Paul. (2002). The formal expression of markedness. Doctoral dissertation, University of Massachusetts Amherst.
- De Lacy, Paul. (2006). Markedness: Reduction and preservation in phonology. Cambridge: Cambridge University Press.
- De Lacy, Paul and John Kingston. (2013). Synchronic explanation. Natural Language & Linguistic Theory, 31, 287–355.
- Itô, Junko. (1986). Syllable theory in prosodic phonology. Doctoral dissertation, University of Massachusetts Amherst.
- Itô, Junko. (1989). A prosodic theory of epenthesis. Natural Language & Linguistic Theory, 7, 217–259.
- Levin, Juliette. (1985). A metrical theory of syllabicity. Doctoral dissertation, MIT.
- Lombardi, Linda. (2002). Coronal epenthesis and markedness. Phonology, 19, 219–251.
- McCarthy, John J and Alan Prince. (1993). Prosodic morphology: Constraint interaction and satisfaction. (Online: roa.rutgers.edu/view.php3?roa=482).
- Morley, Rebecca L. (2015). Deletion or epenthesis?: On the falsifiability of phonological universals. Lingua, 154, 1–26.
- Payne, David; Payne, Judith; & Santos, Jorge. (1982). Morfologia, fonologia, y fonetica del Asheninca del Apurucayali (Campa–Arawak Preandino). Yarinacoha, Peru: Ministry of Education, Summer Institute of Linguistics.
- Rosenthall, Samuel and Laurence Horn. (1997). Vowel/glide alternation in a theory of constraint interaction. Routledge.
- Spring, Cari. (1990a). How many feet per language? In Aaron Halpern (Ed), WCCFL 9: The proceedings of the ninth West Coast Conference on Formal Linguistics. Stanford: CSLI Publications.
- Spring, Cari. (1990b). Implications of Axininca Campa for prosodic morphology and reduplication. Doctoral dissertation, University of Arizona.
- Spring, Cari. (1990c). Unordered morphology: the problem of Axininca reduplication. Proceedings of the sixteenth annual meeting of the Berkeley Linguistics Society, pp. 137–157. Berkeley, CA: University of California.
- Spring, Cari. (1992). The velar glide in Axininca. Phonology, 9, 329–352.
- Yip, Moira. (1983). Some problems of syllable structure in Axininca Campa. In P. Sells and C. Jones (Eds.), Proceedings of NELS 13, pp. 243–251. Amherst, MA: GLSA.
