= Asháninka language =

Arawakan language of Peru and Acre, Brazil

Asháninka
- "Campa"
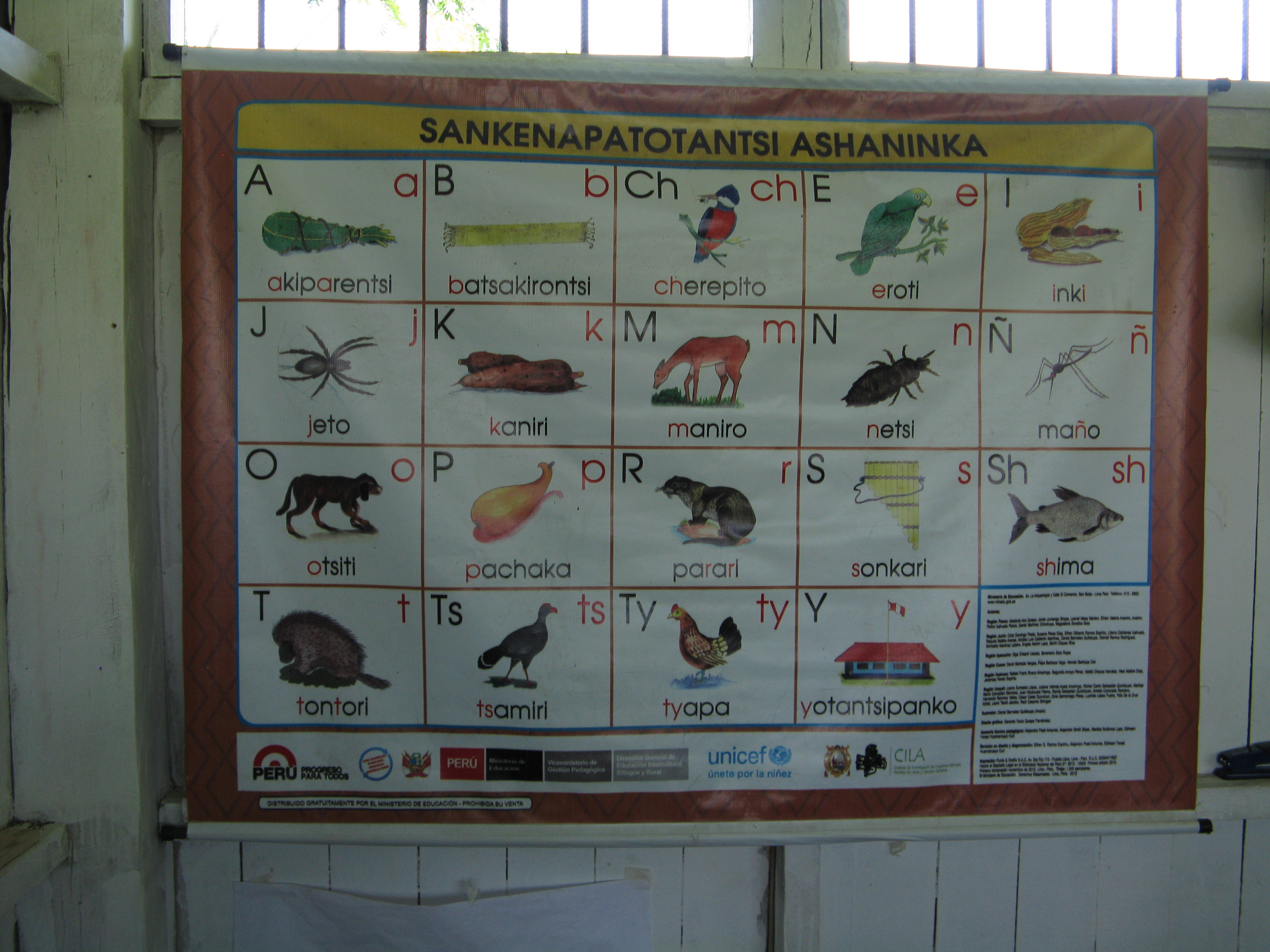
- Table with Ashanica alphabet in a school in Puerto Inca, Peru
- Native to: Peru and Brazil
- Ethnicity: Asháninka people
- Native speakers: 35,000 (2007); 63,000 all varieties Ashaninka & Asheninka (2007 census)
- Language family: Arawakan: Southern; Campa; Asháninka

Language codes
- ISO 639-3: cni
- Glottolog: asha1243
- ELP: Asháninka
- Linguasphere: 82-BBA-aa

Asháninka (also known as Campa, although this name is considered derogatory) is an Arawakan language spoken by the Asháninka people of Peru and Brazil. It is largely spoken in the Satipo Province located in the Amazon forest. While there are low literacy rates in Asháninka, language use is vibrant among the community.

== Classification ==
The Campa (or Pre-Andean) group of the Maipurean language family includes Asháninka, Gran Pajonal Campa, Ashéninka, Axaninca, Machiguenga, and Nomatsiguenga. As these are all very closely related linguistic systems, the decision to call them dialects of a single language or different languages rests on social and political considerations rather than linguistic similarity or difference, as in so many other places in the world. Attempts to unify the varieties with one written standard have not been successful.

== History ==
The language has also been called both Asháninka and Campa; the latter of which is considered by the Asháninka to be offensive, as it derives from the Quechua word thampa, meaning ragged and dirty. Like all languages that have a predominance in any particular region of Perú, Asháninka is an official language in the area in which it is spoken, as provided by the Constitution. Literacy rates range from 10% to 30%, compared to 15% to 25% literacy for the second language, Spanish.

== Threats ==
This language can be categorized as vulnerable for a multitude of reasons. South America has been a target for logging and other deforestation efforts, that are oftentimes illegal. Those that speak Asháninka call the historically dense rainforests of Peru and Brazil their home, and live off this land. This habitat, specially in the Peruvian side, faces a moderate threat from logging and other destructive practices by outside forces.

== Phonology ==
=== Consonants ===
	Labial	Alveolar	Palatal	Velar	Glottal
Plosive	p	t	tʲ	k	
Affricate		t͡s	t͡ʃ		
Fricative	β	s	ʃ		h
Nasal	m	n	ɲ		
Rhotic		ɾ			
Semivowel			j		

Following voiced nasals, voiceless plosives become voiced. Preceding an a vowel, a /k/ sound becomes labialized as [kʷ]. A labial sound [w] is formed when two vowels /oa/ are together.

=== Vowels ===
	Front	Back
Close	i	
Mid	e	o
Open	a	

== Vocabulary ==
English	Spanish	Asháninka	Yanesha'
one	uno	aparo	pat̃e’ts
two	dos	apite	epa
three	tres	maava	ma’pa
man	hombre	shirampari	yacma/encanesha’
woman	mujer	tsinane	peno
dog	perro	otsiti	ochec
sun	sol	poreatsiri	atsne’
wind	viento	tampia	m̃orr
moon	luna	cashiri	arrorr
water	agua	nija	pat̃err
