= Teresita Antazú =

Yanesha Peruvian indigenous leader (born 1960)

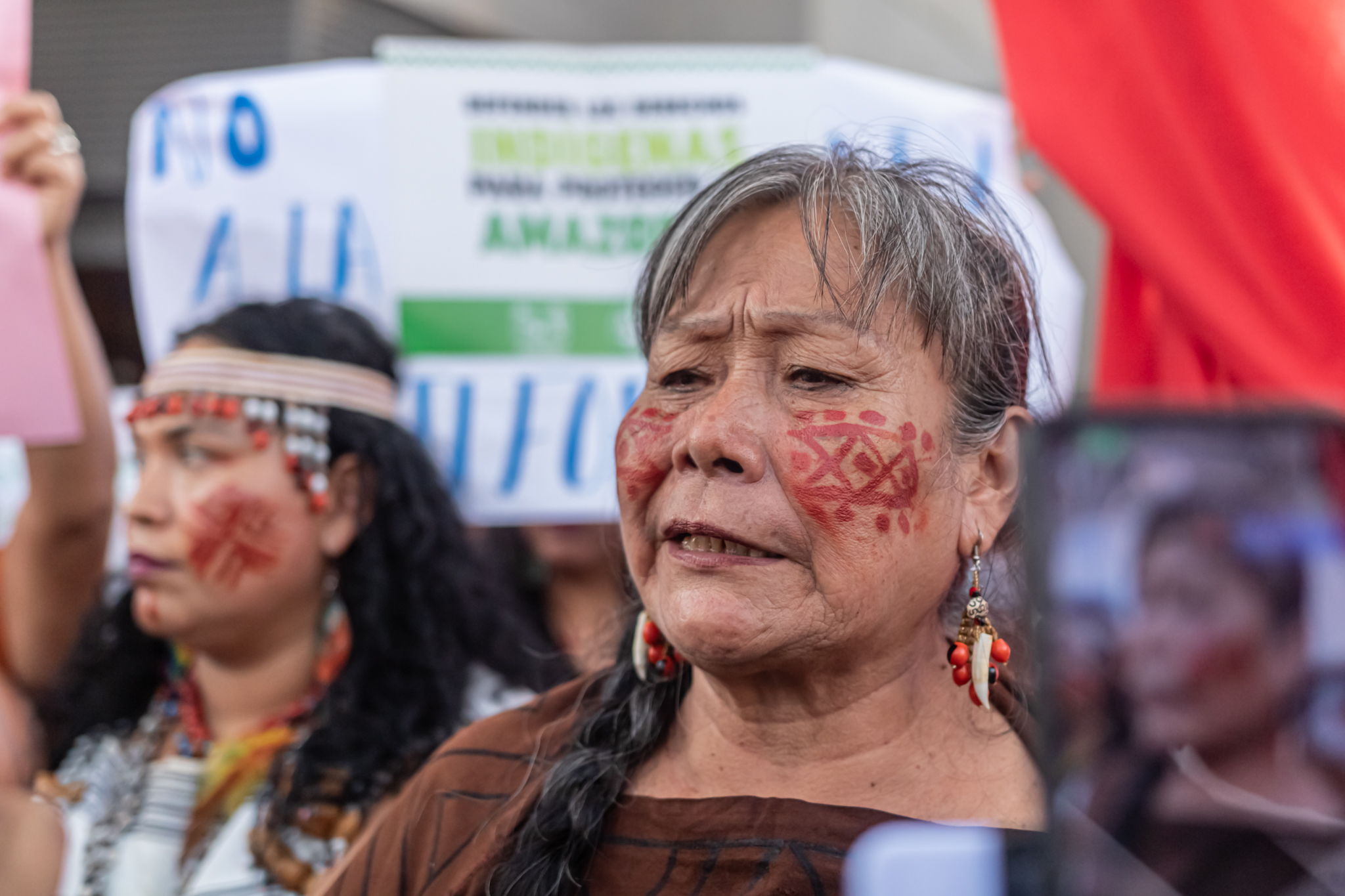
Teresita Antazú in 2024

Teresita Irene Antazú López (born 1960) is a Yanesha Peruvian indigenous leader and promoter of indigenous women's rights, first female leader (cornesha) of the Yanesha people since 2006 as leader of the Union of Ashaninka-Yanesha Nationalities. She is also one of the leaders of the Interethnic Association for the Development of the Peruvian Rainforest (AIDESEP).

== Career ==
Antazú was born in Pasco, Peru, in 1960. As a child, she was denied an education, participation in community meetings, and an identity document, although Antazú maintained a defiant attitude. At the age of 18, she began using a typewriter, which no one in her community in Laguna Raya knew how to use, after learning how to use it while working as a domestic worker outside the community. From then on, Antazú was invited to meetings, although she was not allowed to sit with the other men.

In the following years, Antazú became involved in indigenous organisations such as the Federation of Yanesha Native Communities, the Union of Asháninka and Yanesha Nationalities, and the Regional Association of Indigenous Peoples of the Central Jungle. Her work focused particularly on women, whom she taught to write, read and sew, and educated in feminism.

In 1999, Antazú was appointed as the first woman to serve on the Board of Directors of AIDESEP, the main indigenous organisation in the Peruvian Amazonia, and was put in charge of women's affairs where she was able to conduct training on leadership and women's rights in communities in the Peruvian Amazon. She held that position for six years and in 2005 returned to her community.

In 2006, she was elected cornesha, the highest authority in the Union of Asháninka and Yanesha Nationalities.

Antazú was elected again in 2021 member of the AIDESEP's Board of Directors, which was formed for the first time on an equal footing. On 21 October, together with other indigenous leaders, she met with the Prime Minister Mirtha Vásquez where she specifically mentioned the lack of land titles affecting communities in the Amazon region.

In 2022, she was appointed head of AIDESEP's Indigenous Women's Programme. That year, AIDESEP's Agenda Grande was presented to the Government of Peru, highlighting Antazú's proposals such as the effective and equal participation of women.

After the reform of Forestry Law 29763 by the Congress, in February 2024 Antazú expressed concern as the law could encourage deforestation in the Amazon.

In July 2024, Antazú reported that the government of President Dina Boluarte had failed to adequately address cases of sexual violence against Awajún children.

=== Judicial prosecution ===
On 5 June 2009, in Bagua province, a demonstration by hundreds of indigenous Aguaruna and Wampis people against government decrees that harmed communities in the territory ended with 33 deaths among police and indigenous people.

After participating in a press conference given on 15 May 2009 by the then president of AIDESEP, Alberto Pizango, in which they demanded the repeal of these decrees, the public prosecutor's office filed charges against Antazú and issued an arrest warrant accusing her of the crimes of rebellion, sedition, conspiracy, rioting, disturbing the peace, and inciting unrest. Antazú testified before the prosecutor's office on 4 June, and the case was reported by the World Organisation Against Torture in August 2009. After six years of legal proceedings, she was found not guilty.

== Personal life ==
In 1999, Antazú separated from her husband with whom she has six children.

== Awards ==
- Distinguished Personality of Culture (Government of Peru, 2022)

== See also ==
- Interview with Antazú in 2022
