= Caquinte language =

Endangered Arawakan language of Peru

Caquinte
- Poyenisati
- Native to: Peru
- Native speakers: 500 (2012)
- Language family: Arawakan: Southern; Campa; Ashaninka; Caquinte

Language codes
- ISO 639-3: cot
- Glottolog: caqu1242
- ELP: Caquinte

Caquinte (Caquinte Campa), also Poyenisati, is an Arawakan language of Peru. It is spoken along the Poyeni, Mayapo, Picha, Yori, and Agueni rivers, with some speakers along parts of the Sensa and Vitiricaya rivers, within Junín, Peru. It is an endangered language.

Caquinte people are a division of the Campa Indians. They mostly live outside the "regional cash economy". They raise manioc as protein staple, being a subsistence agricultural community. There are approximately 1,000 people with "sporadic" outside contact.
