= 2009 Peruvian political crisis =

Indigenous-led anti–oil drilling protests

2009 Peruvian clashes
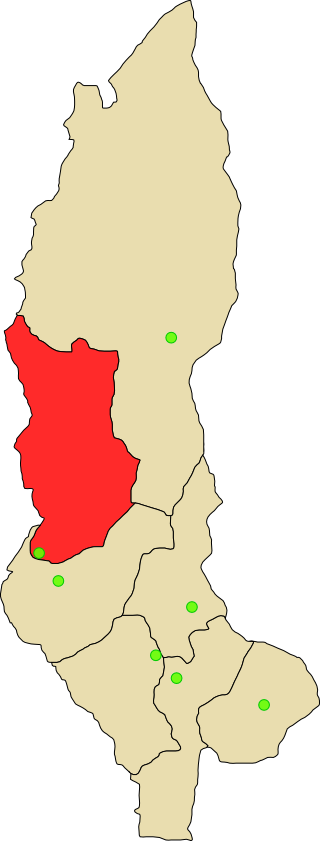
- Bagua Province on map of Amazonas Region.
Date	June 2009
Location	Bagua Province (Peruvian Amazon)
Result	Offending decrees repealed.

Belligerents
Government of Peru: Peruvian National Police	AIDESEP

Commanders and leaders
(Peru) Alan García (Peru) Yehude Simon (Peru) Mercedes Cabanillas	(Peru) Alberto Pizango

Casualties and losses
23 policemen dead 1 policeman missing	10 dead 155 wounded 72 captured

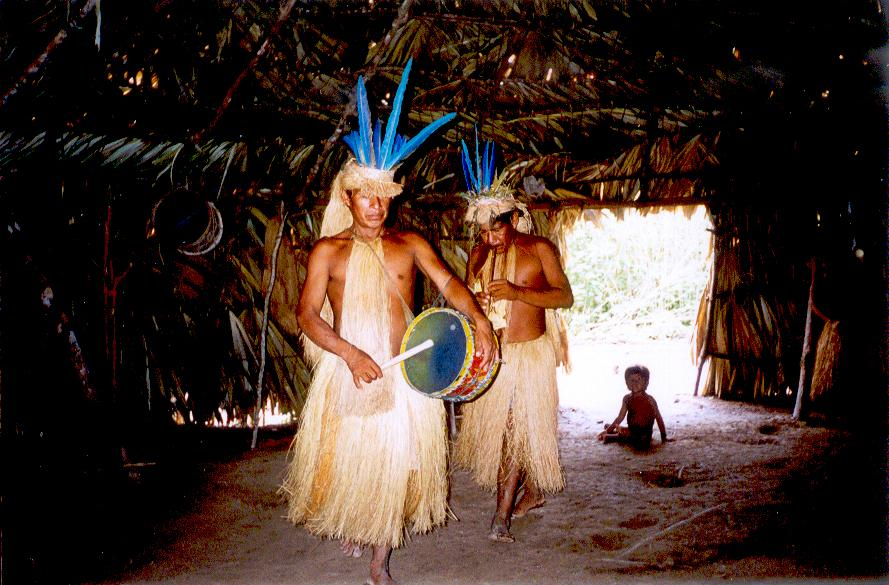
Indigenous people of the Peruvian jungle.

The 2009 Peruvian political crisis resulted from the ongoing opposition to oil development in the Peruvian Amazon by local Indigenous peoples; they protested Petroperú and confronted the National Police. At the forefront of the movement to resist the development was Interethnic Association for the Development of the Peruvian Rainforest (Spanish: Asociación Interétnica de Desarrollo de la Selva Peruana, AIDESEP), a coalition of indigenous community organizations in the region.

Following the government's decision to pass regulations allowing companies access to the Amazon, natives conducted more than a year of declared opposition and advocacy to change this policy and, from 9 April, began a period of protest and civil disobedience. In June 2009, the Garcia government suspended civil liberties, declared a state of emergency, and sent in the military to stop the protests. The military intervention, referred to as the Baguazo, resulted in two days of bloody confrontations, resulting in a total of 23 police deaths, 10 native/civilians deaths and more than 150 native wounded.

This conflict has been described as Peru's worst political violence in years and is the worst crisis of President Alan García's presidency. Prime Minister Yehude Simon was forced to resign his post in the aftermath, and Congress repealed the laws that led to the protests.

== Background ==
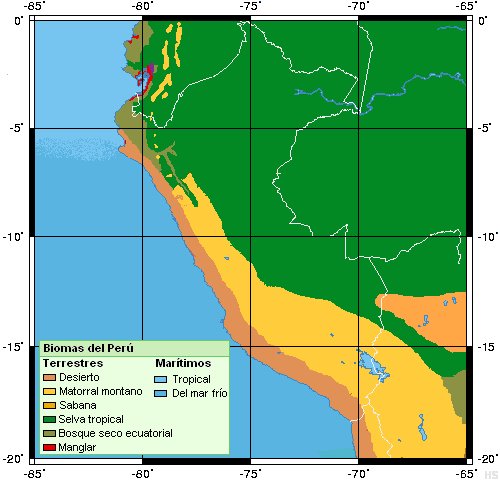
Political map with the biomes of Peru, the jungle in green.

A free trade agreement negotiated between Peru and the United States that came into effect in February 2009 required certain changes in law allowing private companies access to the Amazon for development of resources. The Congress of Peru granted the government authority to implement the required regulatory changes. Indigenous tribes insisted that some of the new government regulations introduced by President Alan García in 2008 threatened the safety of their natural resources and would enable foreign companies to exploit them. Protests ensued in August 2008, and Congress repealed two laws and promised to examine and vote on others. When that didn't happen, protests and blockades resumed on 9 April 2009.

In the early 21st century, exploitation of mineral resources has been criticized by researchers based on the link they have shown between the abundance of natural resources (particularly minerals and oil) of a country and its poor growth performance, as well as poor governmental policies and institutions (subject to ills such as corruption, weak governance, rent-seeking, plunder). They found this relationship is especially related to development of 'point source' minerals such as mines and oil fields, which produce high value for few people, as opposed to agricultural diffuse development, which involves large quantities of workers, forcing benefits to be shared. Some believe that Peruvian oil development functions in such a model of 'point source', providing grievances and low benefit to local populations.

In 2008 an oil scandal shook the government of Alan García when audio tapes revealing corruption and conflict of interest were released to the press. The tapes contained the conversations of Rómulo León, an important member of the ruling Apra party negotiating bribes from foreign companies in order to allow them to drill for petroleum in the Peruvian Amazon region. Romulo León was imprisoned, yet his daughter, Luciana León, a member of congress, continues to work in the parliament despite e-mail messages found by investigators that revealed that she was aware of and participating in her father's activities.

In June 2009, as the dispute worsened, the government ordered the military in to assist the police. The deaths resulted in two clashes fought in the Amazon jungle on 5 and 6 June 2009.

== Battle at "Devil's Curve" ==
On 5 June 2009, at least 31 people were killed in clashes between security forces and indigenous people on the "Devil's Curve" jungle highway close to Bagua, over 1,000 kilometres north of Lima, as the security forces attempted to break down a road blockade. The deaths came when police decided to break down a blockade of 5,000 protesters. 22 of the dead were native tribesmen and 9 were members of the police force. The tribes accused the police of using helicopters to fire on those protesting peacefully below. Alberto Pizango, an indigenous leader, told journalists that the government was responsible for the massacre. Police said the natives had first shot at them; the President said the tribes had "fall[en] to a criminal level".

== June 6, 2009 massacre ==
On June 6, 2009, an additional nine police officers were killed at a petroleum facility belonging to a national oil company, Petroperú, which had been seized by the protesting indigenous tribes. Prime Minister Simon said the officers were killed as they tried to rescue 38 kidnapped police officers believed held. García criticised the protesters, claiming they had behaved like terrorists and suggested that they may have been "incited by foreigners". There was considerable confusion about the events, as it was reported that several police had been taken hostage, although 22 were freed and 7 were missing. This number was later revised to one missing policeman. The government announced a 3:00 p.m. – 6:00 a.m. curfew effective immediately.

According to Amazon Watch, the police staged a violent raid on the unarmed indigenous people who were participating in a peaceful blockade to revoke the "free trade" decrees, issued by President Garcia in the context of the Free Trade Agreement with the United States. During that day, over 600 police attacked several thousand unarmed Awajun and Wamba indigenous peoples (including many women and children) and forcibly dispersed them using tear gas and live ammunition.

After the police started shooting at the protesters, some indigenous wrestled away their guns and fought back, shooting and killing nine policemen. The confrontation resulted in the 25 civilian deaths and more than 150 wounded. The police were accused of burning bodies to hide the death toll.

At least 155 were injured, one third by bullet wounds; 72 people were arrested. The casualty toll was expected to rise. Not since the conflict with the Shining Path had so many people been killed or injured in political clashes of this nature in Peru.

== Consequences ==
=== AIDESEP leaders prosecuted, asylum for Pizango ===
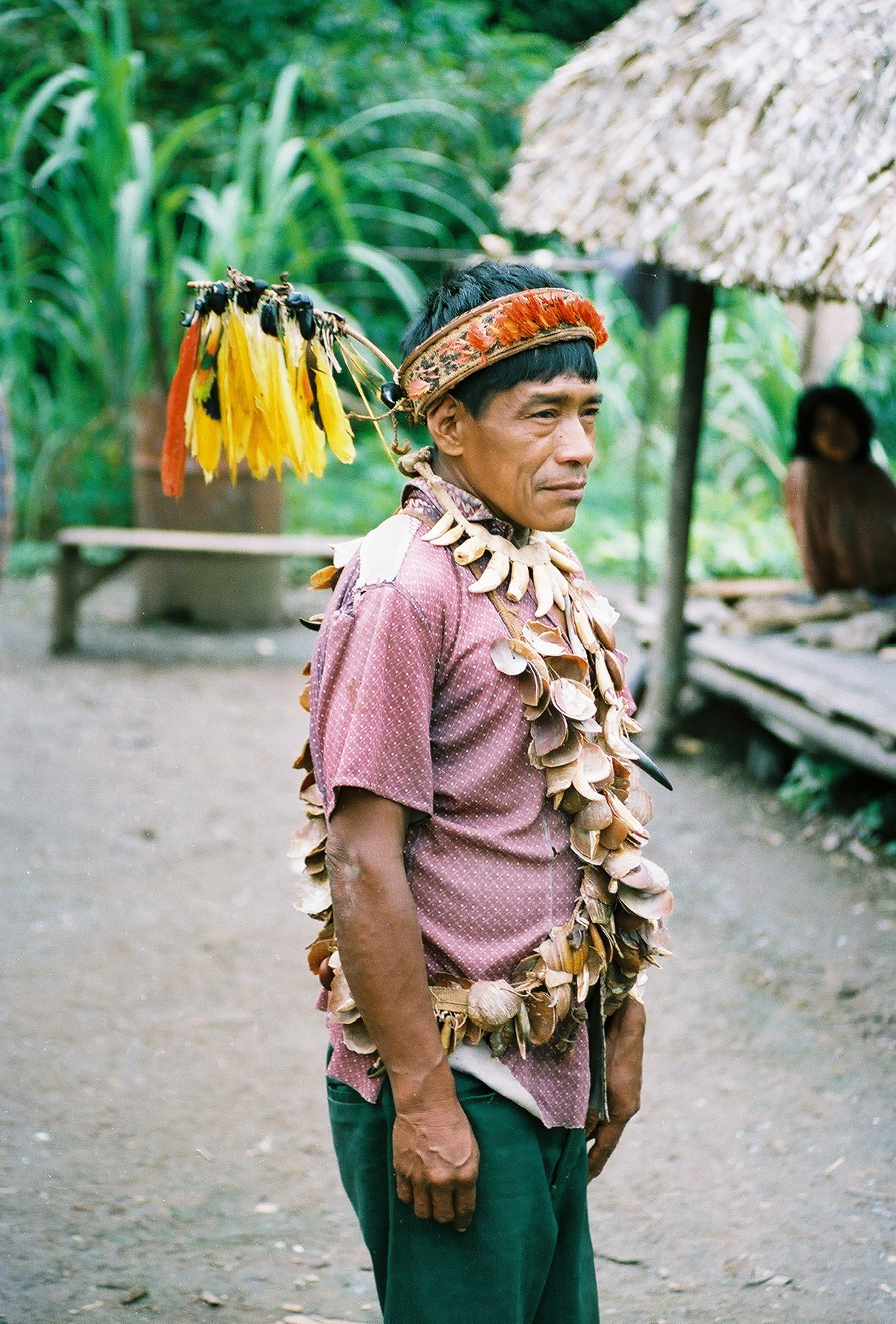
An Urarina shaman

On 9 June, the government of Peruvian President Alan García still refused to meet with the indigenous coalition AIDESEP. The government sought to arrest Alberto Pizango and others Indigenous leaders such as Teresita Antazú on charges of sedition; he is a Shawi Indian leader of the protesters and head of their organization, AIDESEP. Pizango entered Nicaragua's embassy in Lima on 8 June and was granted political asylum the next day. Four other AIDESEP leaders were accused of disturbing the peace and advocating sedition and revolt, and faced up to six years in prison.

=== Decrees suspended, then overturned ===
In the week following the clashes, Congress suspended two of the offending government decrees. The indigenous protesters vowed to continue until the decrees were repealed and not just suspended. On 18 June, Congress repealed two of the decrees, and the protesters lifted their blockade.

=== Vildoso and Simon resign ===
Carmen Vildoso, minister for Women's Issues and Social Development, resigned on 8 June to protest the government's actions.

Prime Minister Yehude Simon negotiated the deal to repeal the two decrees mentioned above and announced on 16 June that he would resign "in the coming weeks" over the government's handling of the crisis. President Alan García had appointed Simon, who is politically to the left of García, in October 2008 in an effort to mollify the country's poor and hard-line leftist nationalists.

=== Peruvian government accused of undermining press freedom ===
In June 2009, Human Rights Watch condemned the Peruvian government's decision to revoke the broadcast license of a local radio station stating that "The timing and circumstances of the revocation suggest that it may have been an act of censorship, or punishment, in response to coverage of anti-government protests on June 5, 2009."

"If there is in fact credible evidence that a radio station has actively supported or incited violence, then the broadcasters should be subject to investigation and sanction, with all appropriate judicial guarantees", said José Miguel Vivanco, Americas director at Human Rights Watch. "But closing down a station this way certainly looks like retaliation for coverage the government didn't like."

=== Documentary ===
The film When Two Worlds Collide is composed of footage shot from 2007 through 2013, and presents a view of events that is sympathetic toward the protestors. It premiered at Sundance Film Festival in 2016.

== See also ==
- 2008 Peru oil scandal
- Amazon rainforest
- Amerindians
- Indigenous peoples of the Americas
- Oil exploration
- Petroperú
- Sarayaku – an Ecuadorian village that has slowed oil explorations
