= Yanesha Communal Reserve =

- IUCN category VI (protected area with sustainable use of natural resources)
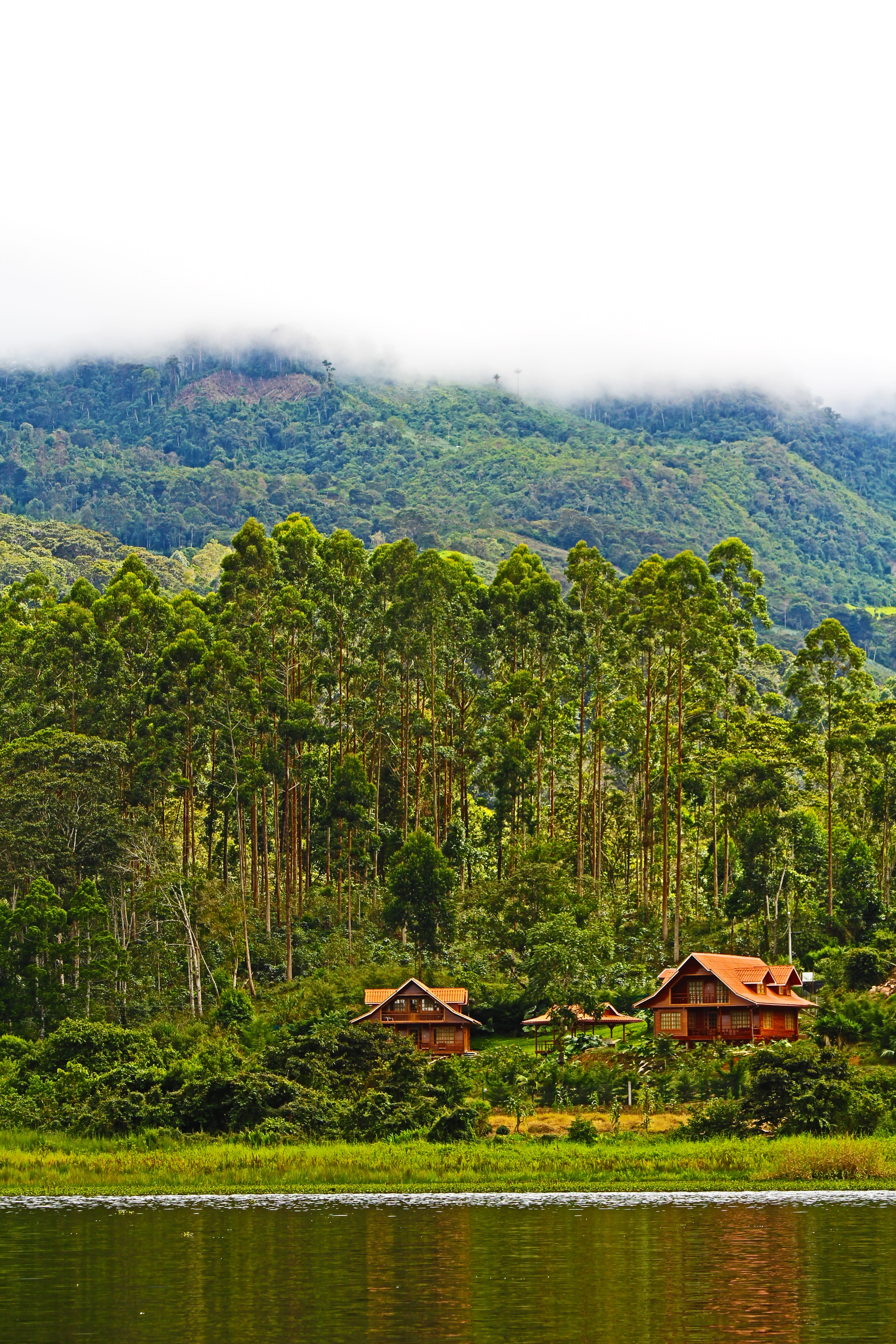

- Location within Peru
- Location: Palcazu District, Peru
- Coordinates: 10.299°S 75.272°W
- Area: 347.45 km^{2} (134.15 mi^{2})
- Established: 1988

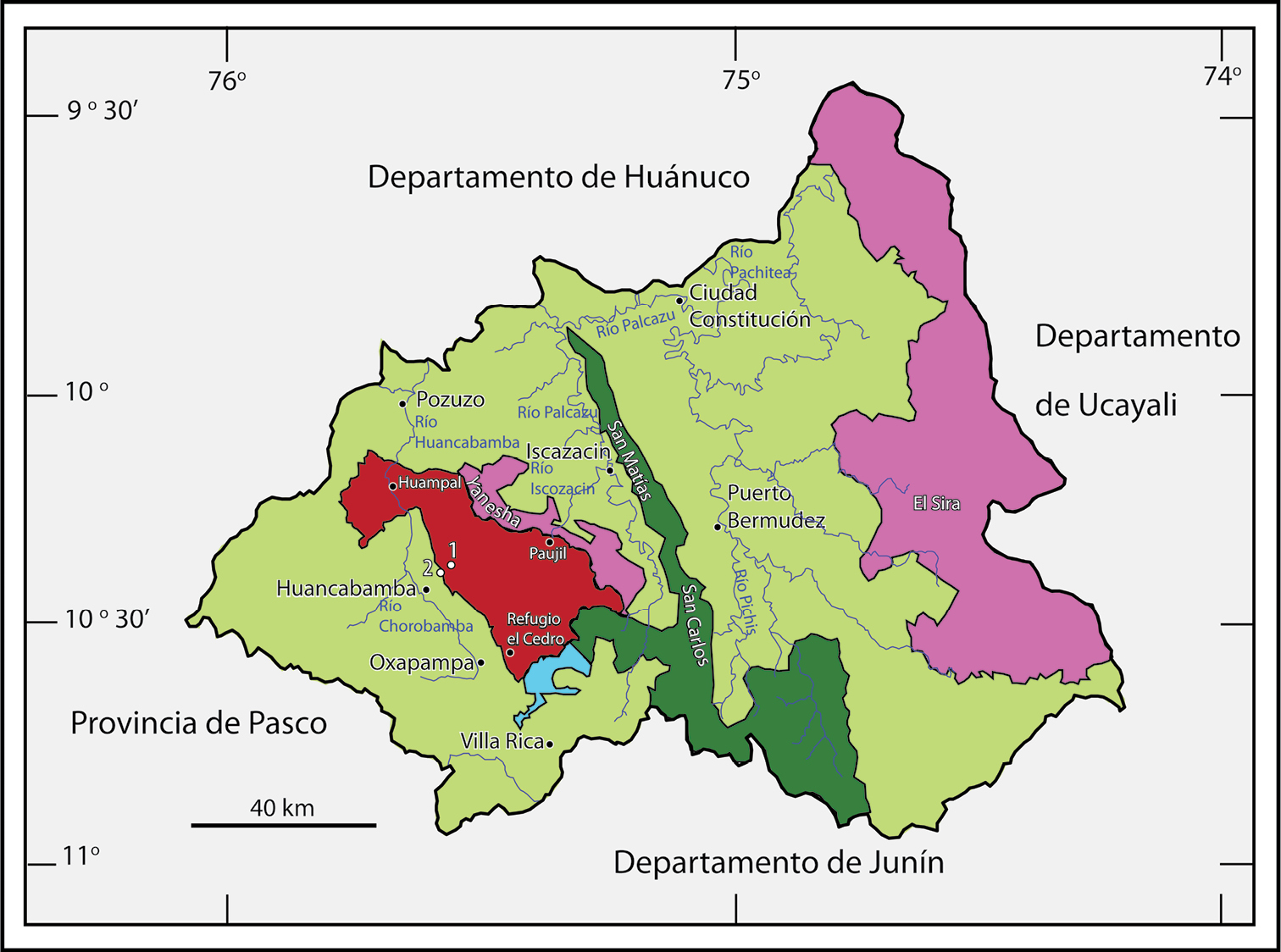
The Yanesha Communal Reservation (in pink)

The Communal Reservation Yanesha or Yanesha Community Reserve is a communal reserve in the Palcazu District of Oxapampa Province of Peru. It covers an area of 347.45 km^{2} (134.15 mi^{2}) in the Palcazu River basin. The reserve was creating by law on April 28, 1988, to protect both wild fauna and indigenous peoples. The Yanesha' people live in the reserve.

== Fauna ==
Important indigenous mammals that live within the reserve include red brocket deer (Mazama americana), collared peccary (Tayassu tajacu), white-lipped peccary (Tayassu pecari), nine-banded armadillo (Dasypus novemcinctus), and agouti (Dasyprocta sp.), as well as monkeys, such as the Ateles sp. and the Lagothrix sp.

The Spix's guan (Penelope jacquacu) is a bird protected in the reserve, and significant fish species include the boquichico (Prochilodus sp.) the sábalo (Brycon melanopoterum), the palometa (Mylossoma aureum), the doncella (Pseudoplatystoma sp.), and the lisa (Leporinus sp.).
