= Alberto Pizango =

Peruvian activist

Alberto Pizango Chota (born August 31, 1964) is the current president of AIDESEP, the premier indigenous rights organization in Peru. He is part of the Shawi people. Pizango has been actively resisting the government of Peru's selling of petroleum concessions to foreign companies on lands legally titled to indigenous people.

== Biography ==
In August 2008, Pizango supported protests by indigenous Amazonians in which the tribal groups seized control of two energy installations—a natural gas field being developed in southern Peru by the Argentine company Pluspetrol, and a petroleum pipeline in northern Peru owned by Petroperú. During the protests, the natives took two police officers hostage. In response, the government declared a state of emergency in the departments of Cusco, Loreto and Amazonas, a move that gave it the power to send in the army to forcibly remove and arrest the protesters. Tensions peaked when Pizango responded to the government's threat to send in troops by stating that "Indigenous people are defending themselves against government aggression."

The standoff ended when Pizango and his AIDESEP organization persuaded Congress to repeal two land laws aimed at opening up Amazonian tribal areas to petroleum companies, which had originally led to the protests by the indigenous tribes. On Friday, September 6, 2008, Congress repealed the laws created by President Alan García, who had created the laws by special presidential decree. Pizango stated that his victory was "A new dawn for the country's indigenous peoples."

After his planned arrest was announced in Lima he sought asylum in Bolivia without success, and was then granted asylum by Nicaragua. In May 2010, he was arrested on arrival to Peru's capital city, Lima, after 11 months of political asylum in Nicaragua. Pizango arrived together with AIDESEP's vice-president Daysi Zapata Fasabi and Q’orianka Kilcher, an actress of indigenous Peruvian descent who played the role of Pocahontas in the film The New World. He was arrested immediately.

Pizango's trial result was announced in 2016 when the Sala Penal de Apelaciones y Liquidadora Transitoria de Bagua acquitted 53 people, mostly natives of the Awajún and Wampis ethnic groups, all of whom were being prosecuted for the death of 12 police officers during the violent protests that occurred around June 5, 2009 in the area called "Curva del Diablo", better known as ' Baguazo'. In its decision, the Chamber considered that the Public Ministry could not demonstrate the responsibility of the accused nor clearly identify any of them as part of the crowd that participated in the actions that led to the deaths of the police.

Pizango is prominently featured in the 2016 documentary When Two Worlds Collide.

== See also ==
- 2009 Peruvian political crisis
