= Nomatsiguenga language =

Arawakan language spoken in Peru

Nomatsiguenga
- inato
- Native to: Peru
- Ethnicity: Machiguenga
- Native speakers: 6,500 (2003)
- Language family: Arawakan: Southern; Campa; Matsigenka; Nomatsiguenga

Language codes
- ISO 639-3: not
- Glottolog: noma1263
- ELP: Nomatsiguenga

Nomatsiguenga (Matsigenka) is an Arawakan language of Peru. It is close enough to Machiguenga to sometimes be considered dialects of a single language, especially given that both are spoken by the Machiguenga people. Most speakers are monolingual.

== Phonology ==
According to Lawrence, Nomatsiguenga has the following consonant and vowel phonemes.

Nomatsiguenga consonants
		Bilabial	Dental	Alveo- palatal	Velar	Glottal	Unspecified
Nasal		m ⟨m⟩	n ⟨n⟩		ŋ ⟨ng, n⟩		N ⟨n, m⟩
Stop	Voiceless	p ⟨p⟩	t ⟨t⟩		k ⟨k⟩		
Stop	Voiced	b ⟨b⟩			g ⟨g⟩		
Fricative			s ⟨s⟩	ʃ ⟨sh⟩		h ⟨h⟩	
Affricate			ts ⟨ts⟩	tʃ ⟨ch⟩			
Liquid				ɾ ⟨r⟩			
Semivowel				j ⟨y⟩			

The archiphoneme ⟨N⟩ is the only consonant that can appear word-medially or in a syllable coda.

Nomatsiguenga vowels
	Front		Central		Back	
High	i ⟨i⟩	iː ⟨ii⟩	ɨi ⟨ë⟩			
Mid	e ⟨e⟩	eː ⟨ee⟩			o ⟨o⟩	oː ⟨oo⟩
Low			a ⟨a⟩	aː ⟨aa⟩		

The diphthong /ɨi/ does not have a long counterpart, nor does it pattern with the other phonemic diphthongs.

Nomatsiguenga has three phonemic diphthongs: /ai/, /ei/, and /oi/.

== Grammar ==
Nomatsiguenga is one of the few languages in the world that has two different causative mechanisms to denote whether the causer was involved in the activity with the causee or not. The prefix ogi- is used to express the idea that the causer was not involved in the activity, while the suffix -hag is used when the causer is involved.

y-ogi-monti-ë-ri i-tomi
3MSG-CAUS1-cross.river-NFUT-3MSG 3MSG-son
"He made his son cross the river (he told him to)."

y-monti-a-hag-ë-ri i-tomi
3MSG-cross.river-E-CAUS2-NFUT-3MSG 3MSG-son
"He made his son cross the river (he helped him across)."
