= Matsigenka language =

Arawakan language spoken in Peru

Matsigenka
- Machiguenga
- Native to: Peru
- Ethnicity: 13,000 Matsigenka (2007)
- Native speakers: 6,200 (2007)
- Language family: Arawakan: Southern; Campa; Matsigenka

Language codes
- ISO 639-3: mcb
- Glottolog: mach1267
- ELP: Machiguenga

Matsigenka (Machiguenga) is a major Arawakan language in the Campa sub-branch of the family. It is spoken in the Urubamba River Basin and along the Manu River in the Cusco and Madre de Dios departments of Peru by around 6,200 people. According to Ethnologue, it is experiencing pressure from Spanish and Quechua in the Urubamba region, but is active and healthy in the Manu region (most speakers are monolingual in Matsigenka). It is close enough to Nomatsiguenga that the two are sometimes considered dialects of a single language; both are spoken by the Machiguenga people. Nanti is partially mutually intelligible but ethnically distinct.

There is extensive morphological inflection in Matsigenka; it is considered to be polysynthetic and features an agglutinative morphology, where both suffixes and prefixes are used to mark various inflectional categories.

== Phonology ==
=== Consonants ===
	Labial	Alveolar		Palatal	Velar		Glottal
	Labial	plain	pal.	Palatal	plain	pal.	Glottal
Plosive	p	t	tʲ		k	kʲ	
Affricate		t͡s		t͡ʃ			
Fricative	β	s		ʃ	ɣ	ɣʲ	h
Nasal	m	n		ɲ			
Rhotic		r					

- Sounds /p, t, tʲ/ are heard as voiced [b, d, dʲ] after nasal consonants. They may also be heard as prenasalized [ᵐb, ⁿd] in word-initial positions.
- /β/ can be heard as approximant sounds [w, β̞] intervocalically between /a/. It can also be heard as a voiced plosive [b] after nasals, and as prenasal [ᵐb] in word-initial position.
- Sounds /ɣ, ɣʲ/ can be heard as approximant sounds [ɰ, ɰʲ] intervocalically in syllable-initial position, and /ɣʲ/ as [j] in free variation in word-initial position. They are also heard as [ɡ, ɡʲ] after nasal sounds. /ɣ, ɣʲ/ can be heard as prenasal [ᵑɡ, ᵑɡʲ] in word-initial position.
- /n/ can be heard as [ŋ] before velar sounds.

=== Vowels ===
	Front	Back
Close	i	u
Mid	e	o
Open	a	

- /i, u/ can be heard as semivowels [w, j] when preceding vowels.

== Sample text ==
The Lord's Prayer in Matsigenka:

Apa Tasorintsi timatsirira enoku, nokogaigake impinkatsatasanoigakempira maganiro matsigenkaegi inkematsatasanoigakempira impegaigakempira Igoveenkariegite. Nokogaigake ontsatagakenkanira aka kipatsiku magatiro pikogakerira viro onkañotakempara otsatagaganira kara enoku. Pimpaigakenara omirinka nogaigakemparira.Pimagisantaerora novetsikaigakerira terira onkametite gara pikenkiagaiganaro. Ariotari nokañoigakari naroegi nomagisantaigakero yovetsikaigakerira tsipereakagaigakenarira tera nonkenkiagaigeri. Pimpampogiakoigakenara ganiri opokashigeigana garira noshintsitashigeigiro. Onti nokogaigake pishintsitagaigakenara ganiri yagaveaigaana kamagarini inkañovagetagaigaenara.
