= Palcazu District =

Coordinates: 10.1643°S 75.2253°W

Palcazu
- District
- Interactive map of Palcazu
- Country: Peru
- Region: Pasco
- Province: Oxapampa
- Founded: June 6, 1986
- Capital: Iscozacin

Government
  - Mayor: Oswaldo Zehnder Kristen

Area
  - Total: 2,886.09 km^{2} (1,114.33 sq mi)
- Elevation: 275 m (902 ft)

Population (2005 census)
  - Total: 8,887
  - Density: 3.079/km^{2} (7.975/sq mi)
- Time zone: UTC-5 (PET)
- UBIGEO: 190304

Palcazu District is one of eight districts of the province Oxapampa in Peru.
