= Pre-Andine languages =

Arawakan language branch of Western Amazon

Pre-Andine
- Campa
- Geographic distribution: Western Amazon
- Linguistic classification: Arawakan: Southern; Pre-Andine
- Subdivisions: Asháninka; Ashéninka; Kakinte; Matsigenka; Nomatsigenga; Ashe-Asha Norte; Nanti

Language codes
- Glottolog: prea1240
- ELP: none; Ashéninka
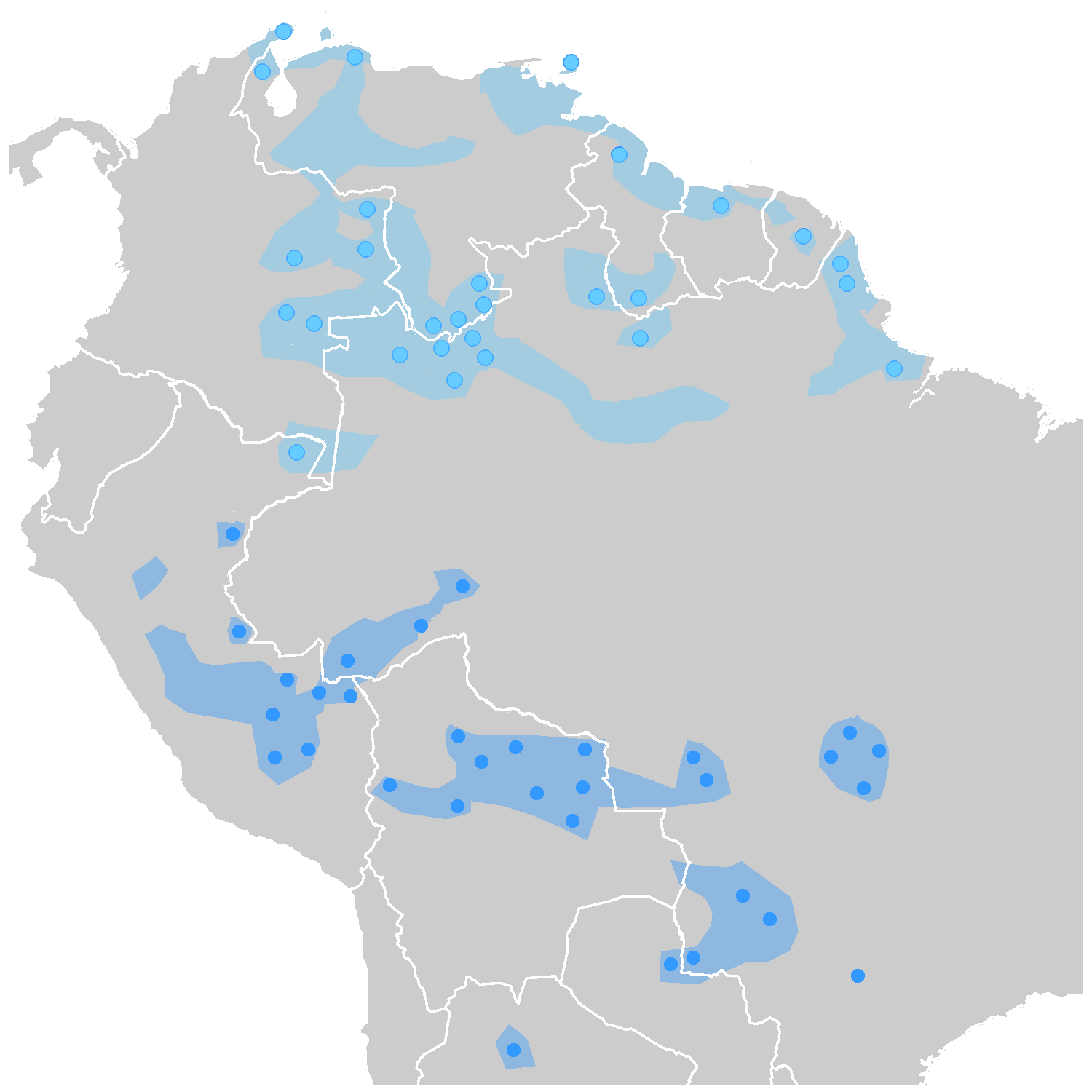

The Pre-Andine Maipurean or Arawakan languages, formerly known as the Campa (Kampa) or Campan (Kampan) languages, are a group of closely related Arawakan languages of the Peruvian Amazon.

== Languages ==
Glottolog uses the term Pre-Andine for this group of languages and classifies them as follows, based on classifications by Michael (2011) and Pedrós:

- Pre-Andine
  - Nomatsigenga
  - Asha-Ashe-Kak-Matsi-Nan
    - Matsi-Nan
      - Matsigenka
      - Nanti
    - Asha-Ashe-Kak
      - Caquinte
      - Ashe-Asha
        - Asháninka
        - Ashéninka
          - Ashéninka Pajonal
          - South Ucayali Ashéninka
        - Ashe-Asha Norte
          - Ashéninka Perené
          - Pichis Ashéninka
          - Aiyíninka Apurucayali
          - Ucayali-Yurúa Ashéninka

There are grammars for Ucayali-Pajonal, Ashéninka Perené, Nanti, Aiyíninka Apurucayali, and Caquinte.

== Cognates ==
Common vocabulary of Pre-Andine languages

English	Nomatsiguenga	Asháninca	Ashéninca	Matsiguenga
Pipile cujubi	kanari	kanari	kanari	kanari
my Pipile cujubi	nʊ-ganari	nʊ-janari	nʊ-ganari	nʊ-janari
eye	-ʊki	-ʊki	-ʊʊki	-ʊki
peach palm	kə(i)ri	kiri	kiri	kɨiri
shit	-tika	-tia	-tija / -tsija	-tiga
ear	-gemita	-jeNpita	-jiNpita	-geNpita
dry	piria	pirihata	piriaa(t)	-piriata
bat	pihiri	pi(h)iri	piiri	pihiri
earth	kipatsi	kipatsi	kipatshi	kipatsi
feather	-biti	-witi	-witi	-witi
three	maba	maawa	mawa	mawa
my leg	nʊ-bari	nʊ-wʊri	nʊ-wʊri / nʊ-pʊri	nʊ-wʊri
bark/shell	-taki	-taki	-taki	-taki
beard	-sipʊtʊna	-ʃipatʊna	-ʃipatʊna	-ʃipatʊna
(finger)nail	-ʃata	-seata-ki	-seata-ki	-ʃata
tree	aNtʃa-	aNta-	aNta-	aNta-
chachalaca	marati	marati	ma(r)atsi	marati
seed	-gitsʊ	-itsʊ-ki	-kithʊ-ki	-kitsʊ-ki
rope	-tsa	-tsa	-tha	-tsa
liberator	-tsi	-tsi	-tshi	-tsi
urine	-tsine	-tsini	-tshini	-tsini
moon		kaʃiri	kaʃiri	kaʃiri
wasp	sani	sani	sani / hani	sani
coati	kopesi	kapeʃi	kapeʃi	kapeʃi
fish	sima	ʃima	ʃima	ʃima
small	(h)ani-	hani- / hana-		ana-
wife	-hina	-hina	-ina	-hina
husband	-hime	-hime	-ime	-(h)ime
river	-ha	-ha	-a	-a
cotton	(ome-gi)	-ampe-hi	-ampi	ampe-i
two	pite-	apite	apite	pite-
salt	tibi	tiwi	tsiwi	tiwi
hard	-bakʊ	-akʊ	-akʊ	-akʊ
thorn	-tsei	-tsee-	-tʃee	-tsei
1pl (inclusive)	-ai	-ae	-ai	-ai
