= Asháninka =

Ethnic group

Ashenika
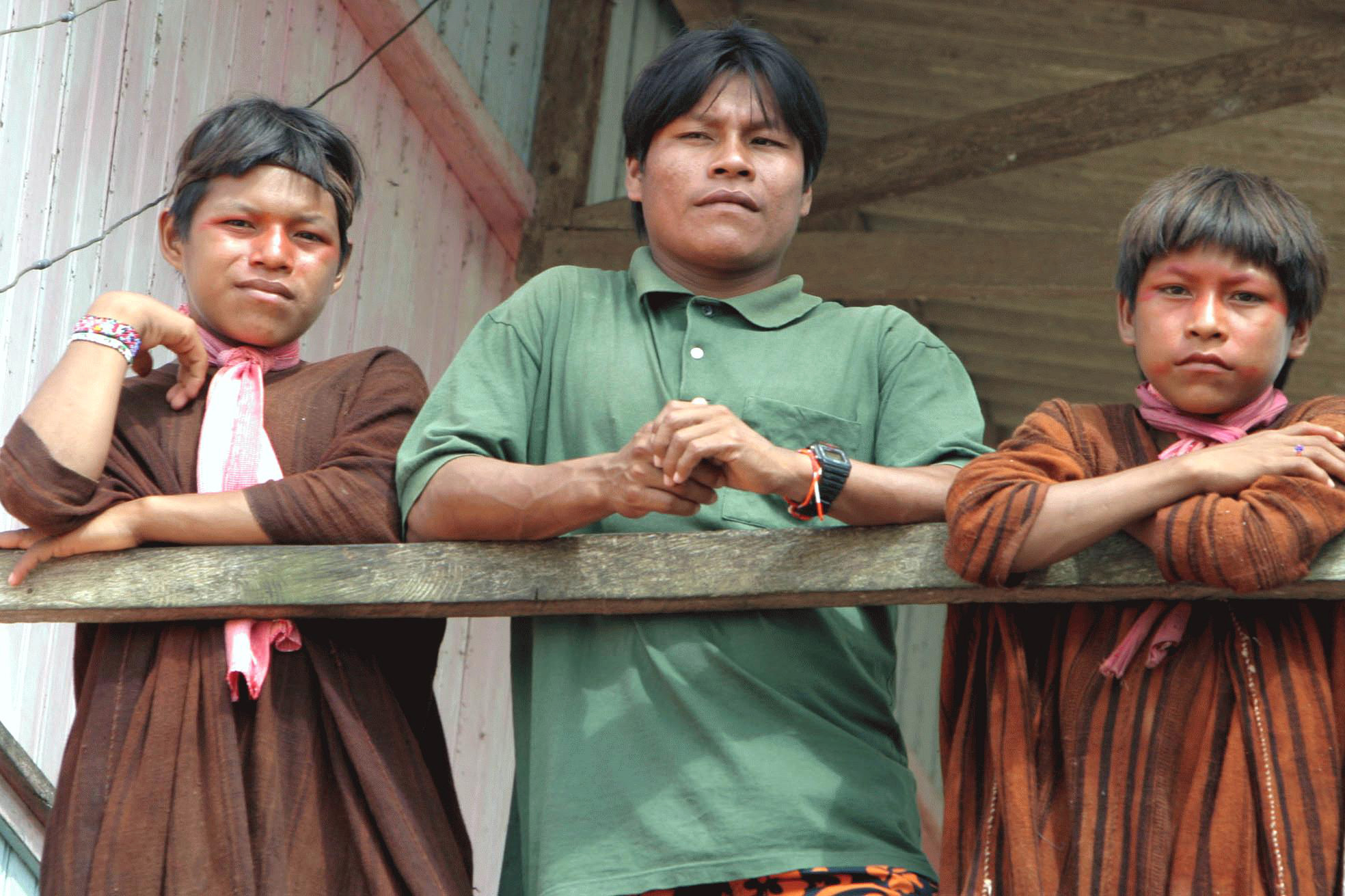

Total population
- 99,122 (2014)

Regions with significant populations
- Peru (Junín, Pasco, Huanuco, Ucayali) 97,477 (2007), Brazil (Acre) 1,645 (2014)

Languages
- Asháninka, Spanish, Portuguese

Religion
- Traditional tribal religion

The Asháninka or Asháninca are an Indigenous people living in the rainforests in the regions of Junín, Pasco, Huánuco, and Ucayali in Peru, and in the State of Acre in Brazil. Their ancestral lands are in the forests of Junín, Pasco, Huánuco and part of Ucayali in Peru.

== Population ==
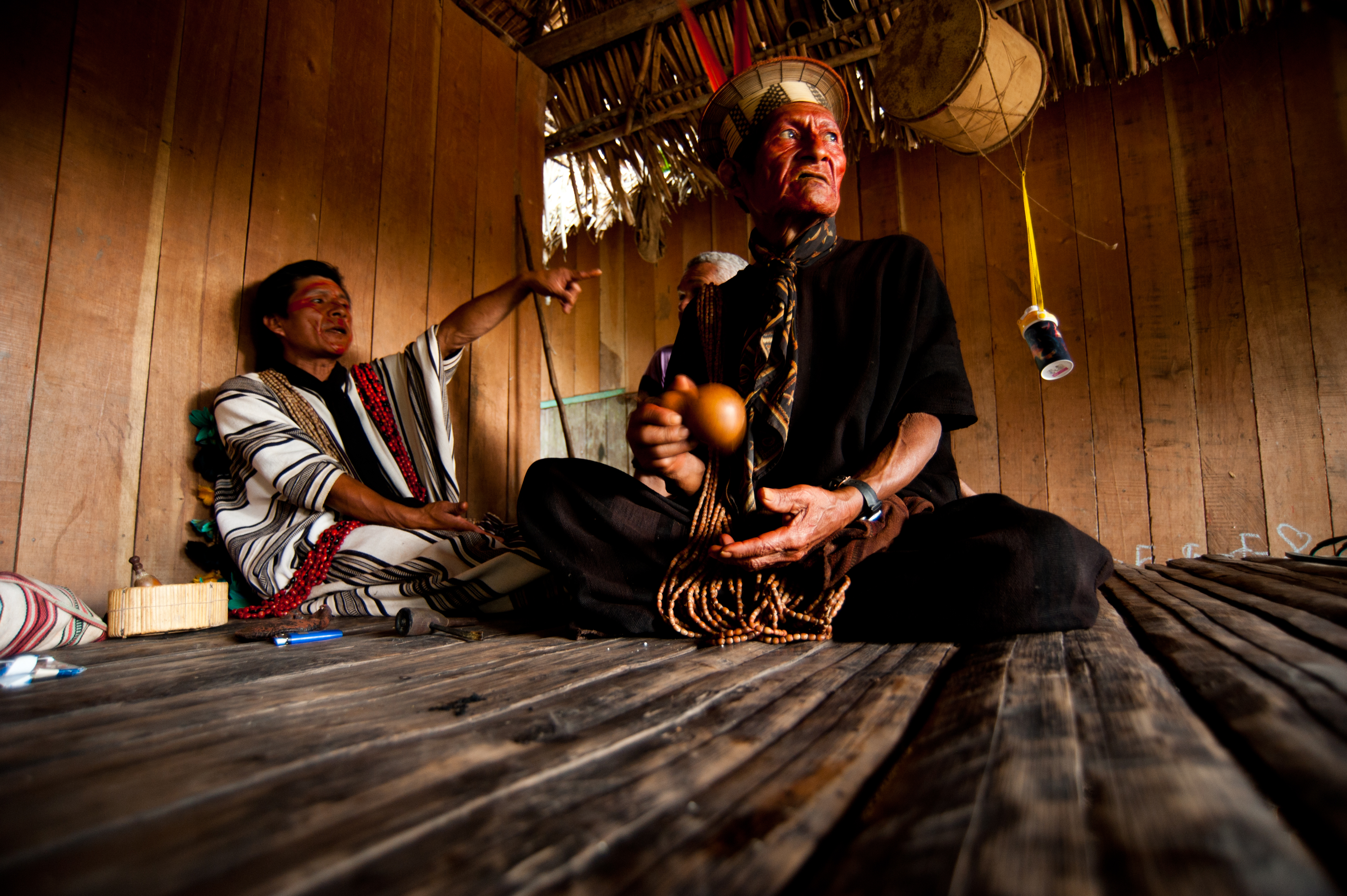
Asháninka men in house, Acre, 2010

The Asháninka are estimated between 25,000 and 100,000, although others give 88,000 to almost 100,000. Only little more than a thousand of them live on the Brazilian side of the border. The Ashaninka communities are scattered throughout the central rainforests of Peru in the provinces of Junin, Pasco, Huanuco, a part of Ucayali, and the Brazilian state of Acre.

== Subsistence ==
The Asháninka are mostly dependent on subsistence agriculture. They use the slash-and-burn method to clear lands and to plant yucca roots, sweet potato, corn, bananas, rice, coffee, cacao and sugar cane in biodiversity-friendly techniques. They live from hunting and fishing, primarily using bows and arrows or spears, as well as from collecting fruit and vegetables in the jungle.

== History ==
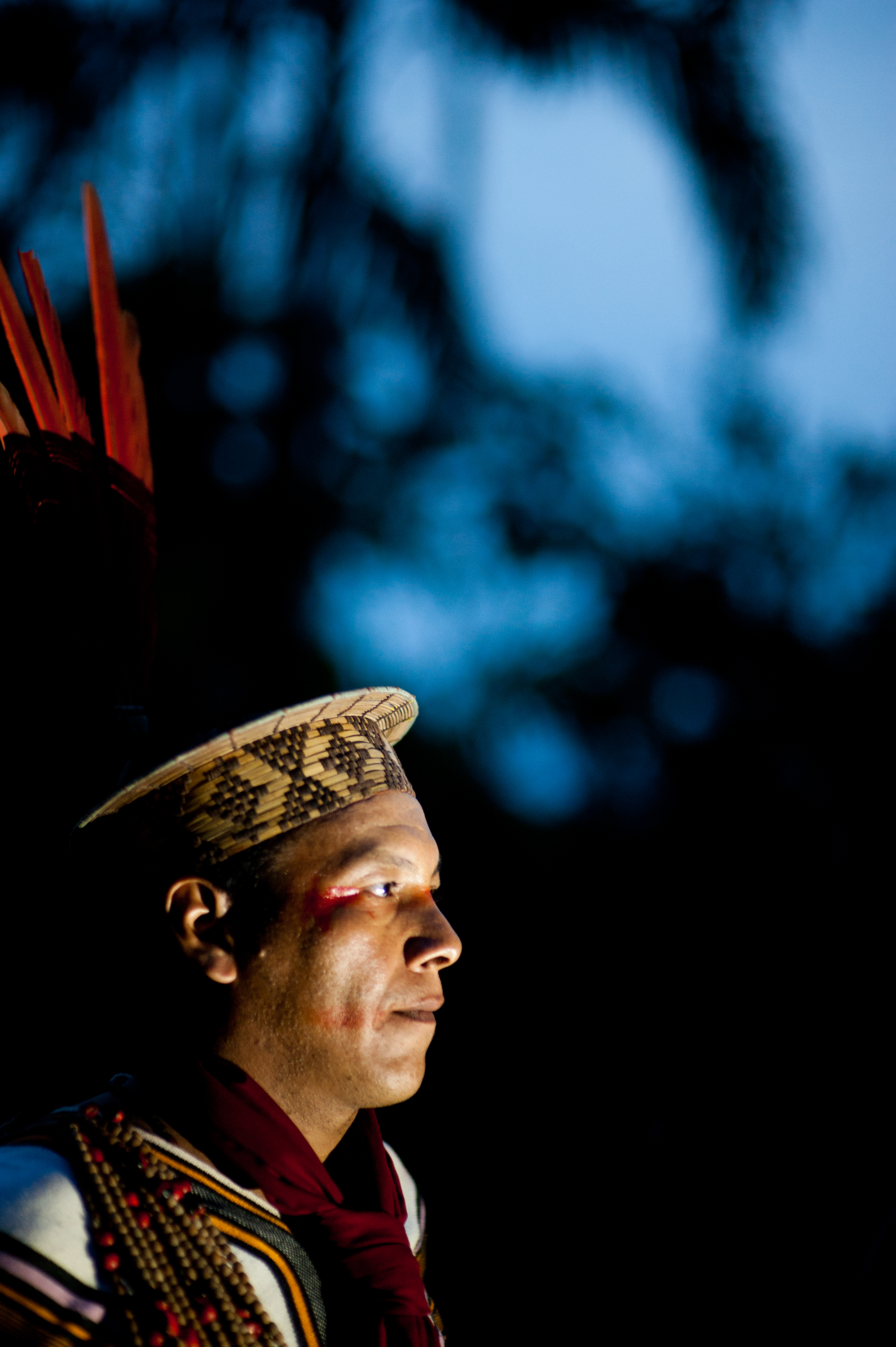
Asháninka man with woven palm crown

The Asháninka were known by the Incas as Anti or Campa. The Antis, who gave their name to the Inca province of Antisuyu, were notorious for their fierce independence, and their warlike skills in successfully protecting their land and culture against intrusion from outsiders.

Ashanínka tribal societies have faced overwhelming obstacles in disputes over territory and culture against the immigrating Spanish culture and neighboring tribal societies. Biodiversity is the establishment of the Ashanínka way of life, so they treat this biodiversity hotspot as their natural capital. Beginning in AD 1542, the European settlers pushed to overtake the natural resources. In June 2010, however, the Brazilian and Peruvian governments signed an energy agreement that allows Brazilian companies to build a series of large dams in the Brazilian, Peruvian, and Bolivian Amazon. The problem with the 2,000-megawatt Pakitzapango Dam is that it has a permanent location that is proposed to be located in the heart of Peru's Ene valley and could displace as many as 10,000 Ashanínka. These encroaching problems have not only extremely changed the generational culture of the Ashanínka tribal societies, but has also changed landscape of what we call modern-day Peru. Asháninka activists have defended indigenous rights and territories, including Luzmila Chiricente Mahuanca.

== Threats ==
The Asháninka are known historically to be fiercely independent, and were noted for their "bravery and independence" by the Spanish conquistadors. They resisted with some success missionary endeavors by Roman Catholic missionaries from the 17th to 19th centuries, especially near the Cerro de la Sal (Salt Mountain) and the Gran Pajonal (Great Grassland) in the central part of the Amazon basin in Peru. During the rubber boom (1839–1913), the Asháninka were enslaved by rubber tappers and an estimated 70% of the Asháninka population was killed. The rubber enterprise founded by Carlos Fitzcarrald killed many Asháninka people during the rubber boom and enslaved the Asháninka which would not voluntarily extract rubber for Fitzcarrald.

In 1914, there was an Asháninka rebellion against the settlers, missionaries and rubber tappers in the Pichis area and the latter group was evicted from the region by this rebellion. While describing the suppression of this rebellion, anthropologist Stefano Varese wrote: "The government responded to these attacks by sending repressive military missions, but these were demonstrations of sovereignty and authority more than a true interest in retaking the lost rich rubber lands."

For over a century, there has been encroachment onto Asháninka land from rubber tappers, loggers, Maoist guerrillas, drug traffickers, colonists, and oil companies.

During the 1980s and 90s, the Asháninka suffered forced conscription, forced labour and massacres at the hands of the Sendero Luminoso and the MRTA. Of the 55,000 Asháninka in Junín, around 6000 were killed, 10,000 were displaced, and 5000 imprisoned in camps of the Sendero Luminoso. About 30 to 40 Asháninka villages were obliterated.

Malaria is on the rise in Asháninka communities. Current threats (either directly or indirectly) are from oil companies, drug traffickers, colonists, illegal lumberers, illegal roads, and diseases brought by outsiders. In 1988 a program started in Peru to teach Spanish language to Indigenous people.

For many years the Asháninka has been at risk from the Shining Path, which controls the production and distribution of coca in the region.

== Demography ==
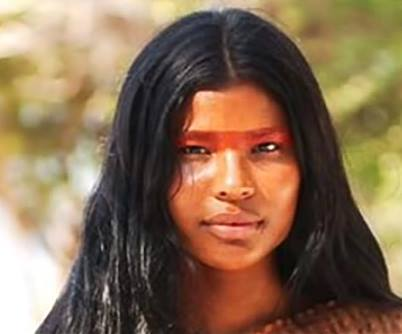
Asháninka woman in Ucayali, Peru

=== In Peru ===
In Peru, the Ashaninkas lived dispersed in a vast territory that included the valleys of the Apurímac, Ene, Tambo, Perené, Pichis rivers, a sector of the Alto Ucayali and the interfluvial zone of the Gran Pajonal, organized into small residential groups made up of around five nuclear families under the direction of a local chief or Kuraka. The rivers where the Ashaninka are settled and where they can be found are the Lower Apurímac, Ene, Tambo, Satipo, Pichis, Lower Urubamba, Upper Ucayali, Pachitea and Yurúa, as well as their main tributaries. Due to migrations, whether due to political violence or interest in the extraction of forest resources, they have mobilized and shared territories with other ethnic groups, such as in the Lower Urubamba, where they share space with the Machiguenga.

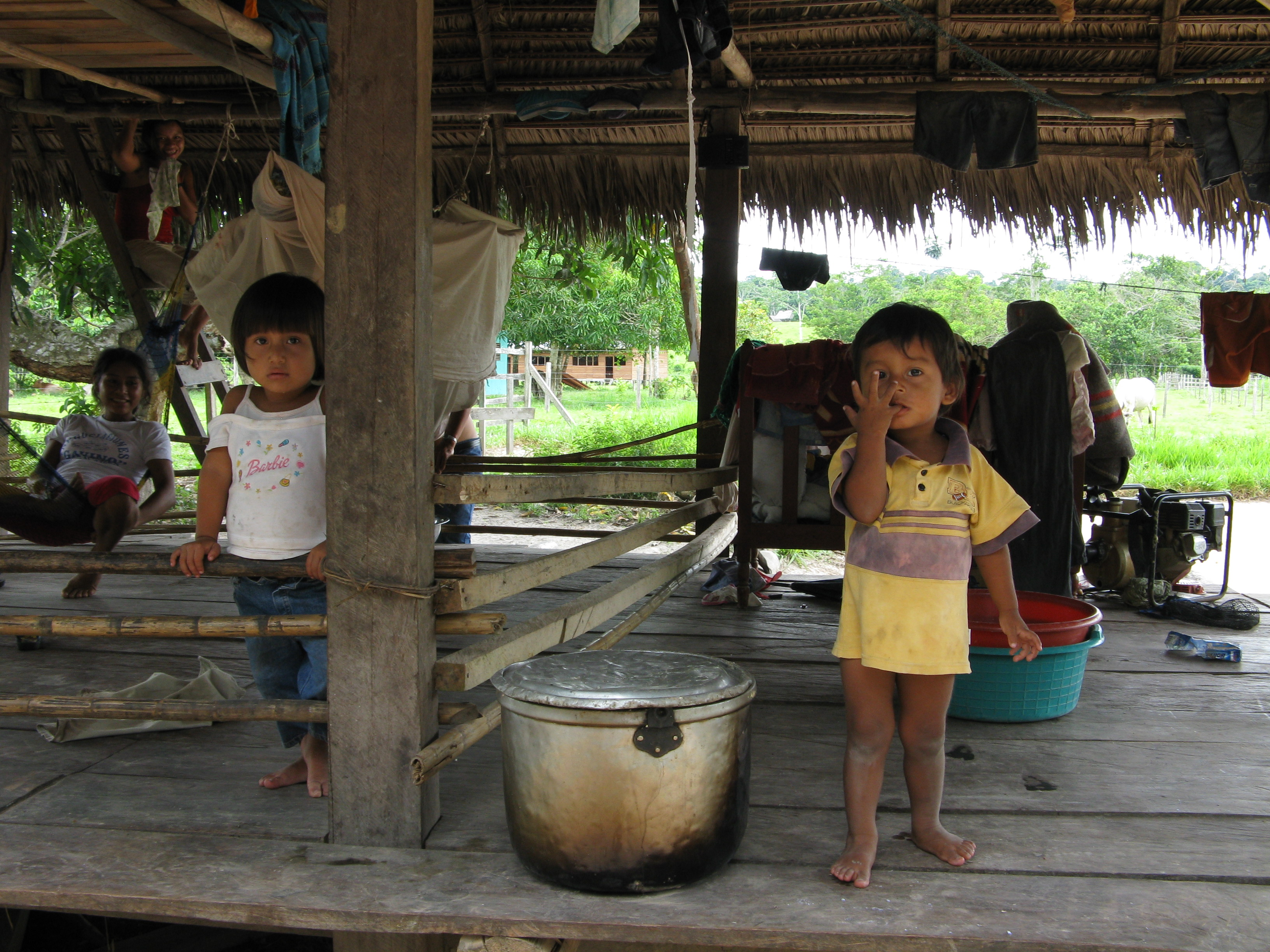
Two Asháninka children in their home in the Ucayali region

=== In Brazil ===
The Asháninka in Brazilian territory add up to more than 1,000 inhabitants. Known as Kampas in Brazil and also as Campas in Peru (pejorative term), they are distributed in small towns along the Breu, Amônia, and Arara rivers, tributaries of the Envira and Yurúa rivers, in the state of Acre. Its population was estimated at 689 people according to data from the CEDI of 1991.

It is very probable that the presence of Asháninka in Brazil is due to the action of the mine owners who forced them to move from Gran Pajonal. The presence of Asháninkas in Brazilian territory, actually, goes back to the eighteenth century.

== Traditional dress ==
They are of fine physique and generally good-looking. Their dress is a robe with holes for the head and arms. Their long hair hangs down over the shoulders, and round their necks a toucan beak or a bunch of feathers is worn as an ornament.

— Encyclopædia Britannica Eleventh Edition, 1911

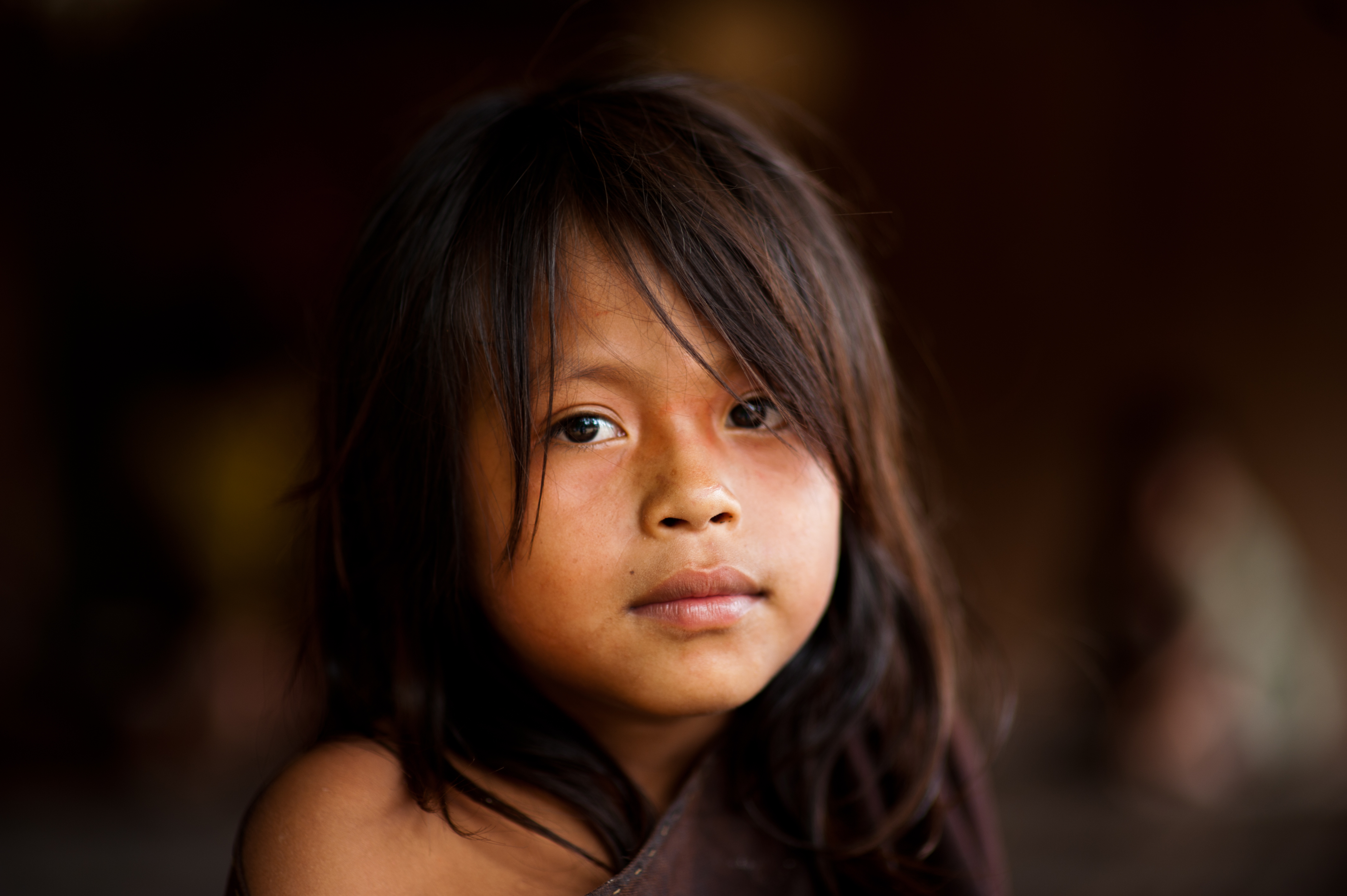
Ashaninka child in Brazil.

The Asháninka traditional dress, commonly known as a kushma, is a robe made from cotton that is collected, spun, dyed and woven by women on looms. Typically the robes are dyed either brown or a bright royal blue. The shoulders of the garments are ornamented with seeds. A full-length robe can take up to three months to complete.

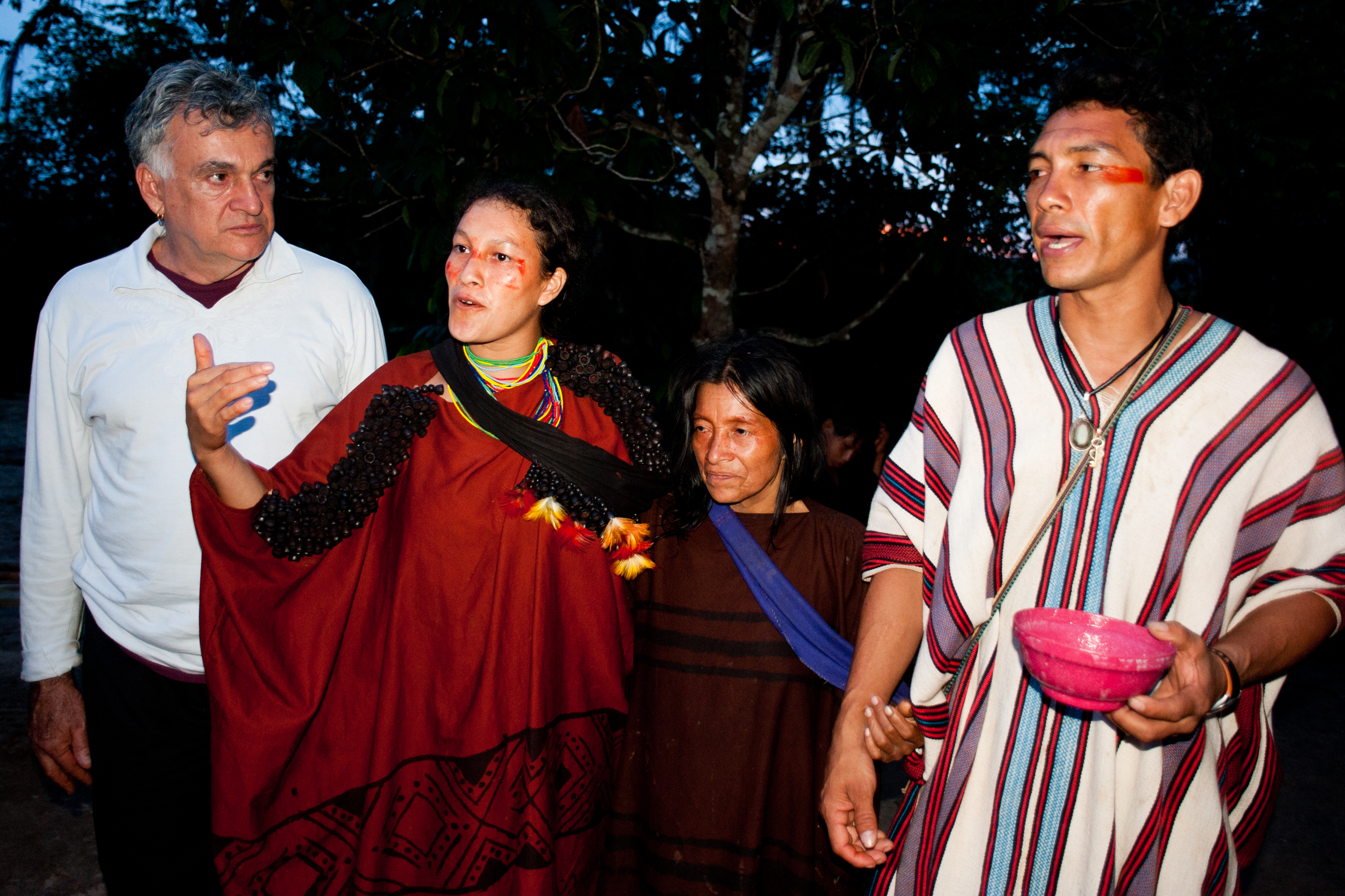

Traditionally, women wear their hair long, and over the shoulder, while typically men wear their hair short or in "bowl" cuts below the ear. Around their necks they wear a large variety of necklaces and bracelets made with seeds, the teeth of tapir, peccary and monkeys, and brightly colored feathers.

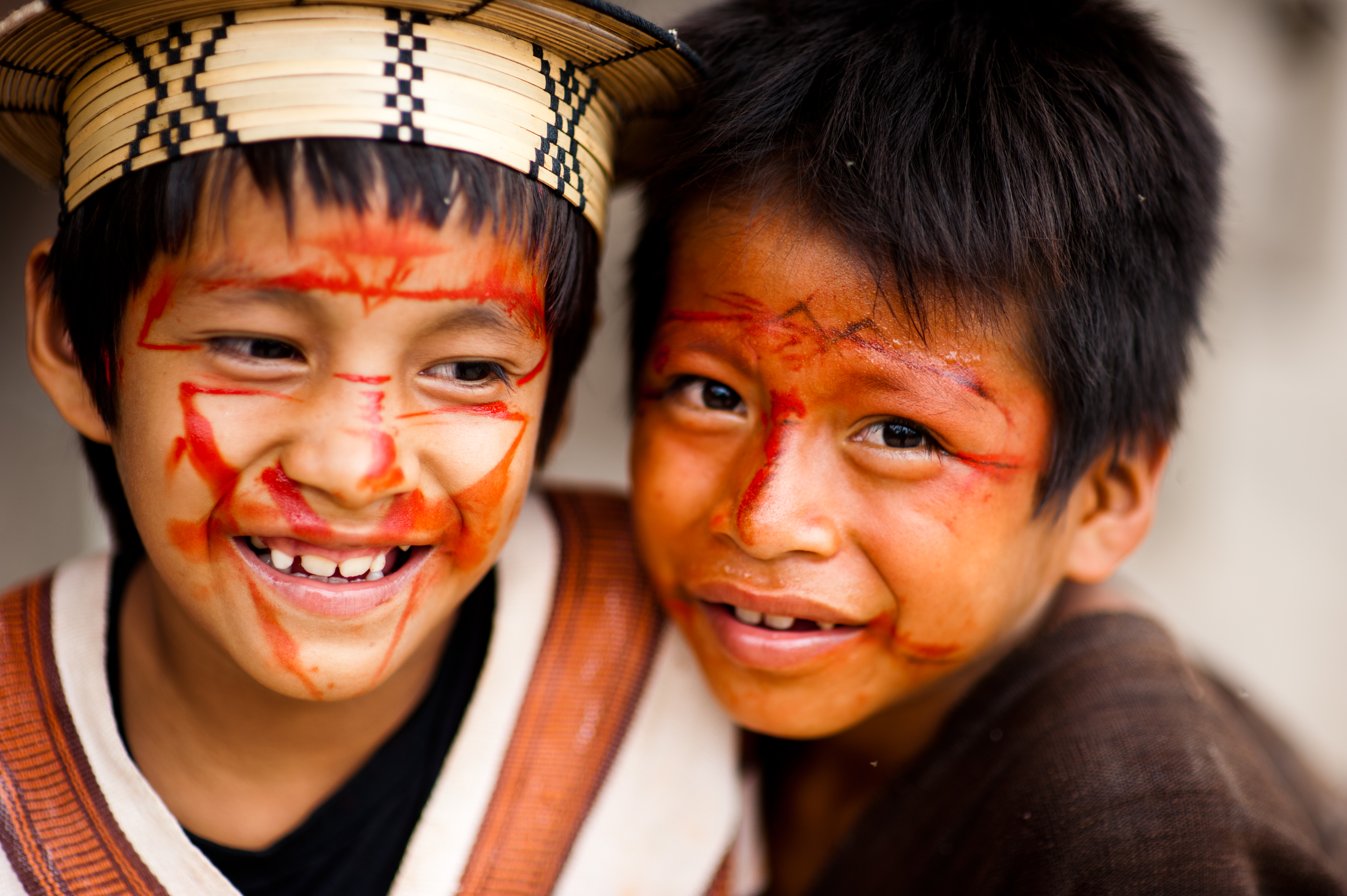
Asháninka boys with face paint, Acre, 2010

Traditionally the Asháninka men, women and children paint their faces in a variety of designs using the bright red crushed seeds of Achiote (Bixa orellana) (annatto) fruits. For ceremonial purposes, the men also wear woven circles of palm leaves decorated with feathers on their heads, and the women wear a woven cotton head dress.

== Language ==
The Asháninka language belongs to the Arawak linguistic family, as do the Matsiguenga, Yine, Caquinte, Yanesha and Nomatsiguenga languages. In Peru it is spoken by approximately 25,000 Asháninka. It is spoken in the central eastern Amazonian region of Peru, particularly in the departments of Junín, Pasco, Huánuco and Ucayali, with additional presence in adjacent areas including Cusco.

== See also ==
- Asháninka language
- 2009 Peruvian political crisis

== Bibliography ==
- Varese, Stefano (2002). Salt of the Mountain Campa Asháninka History and Resistance in the Peruvian Jungle. University of Oklahoma Press. ISBN 978-0-8061-3446-8.
