= Ashéninka language =

Arawakan language of southern Peru and Brazil

Ashéninka
- "Campa"
- Native to: Peru, Brazil
- Ethnicity: Ashéninka people
- Native speakers: 8,774 (2017)
- Language family: Arawakan: Southern; Campa; Ashéninka

Language codes
- ISO 639-3: cjo
- Glottolog: ashe1273
- ELP: Ashéninka

Ashéninka (Ashéninca, Ashéninga) is the name that some varieties included in the Ashéninka-Asháninka dialect complex have traditionally received. These varieties belong to the Campan branch of the Arawak family. Ethnologue distinguishes seven languages throughout the whole complex, while Pedrós proposes a division in three languages (Ashéninka, Asháninka and Northern Ashé-Ashá) based on the principle of mutual intelligibility. The varieties included in Ashéninka and Northern Ashé-Ashá have traditionally been called Ashéninka. Glottolog reflects Pedrós’ proposal, although considering the languages proposed by him as family-level divisions of the languages that the Ethnologue distinguishes.

According to the indigenous peoples database of the Peruvian Ministry of Education, there are 15,281 people living in Ashéninka communities, of whom 8,774 (57%) claim to be able to speak the language. Ethnologue gives much higher figures for the different Ashéninka varieties.

The classification of the different varieties was first established by David Payne in his Apurucayali Axininca grammar, but he referred to them as dialects and not as different languages.

Ashéninka is a locally official language in Peru, as are all native Peruvian languages. It and its relatives are also known by the pejorative term Campa.

== Phonology ==
=== Consonants ===
Pedrós (2023) shows the following consonant inventory for Ucayali-Pajonal (South Ucayali and Pajonal):

		Bilabial		Dental/ Alveolar		Post- alveolar	Palatal	Velar		Glottal	
		plain	pal.	plain	pal.	Post- alveolar	Palatal	plain	pal.	plain	pal.
Plosive	voiceless	p	pʲ	t			c	k	kʲ		
Plosive	aspirated			tʰ							
Affricate	voiceless			ts							
Affricate	aspirated			tsʰ		tʃʰ					
Fricative						ʃ				h	hʲ
Rhotic				ɾ	ɾʲ						
Nasal		m	mʲ	n			ɲ				
Approximant		w/β̞	β̞ʲ				j	ɰ			

Judith Payne (1989) describes the following consonant inventory for Pichis:

		Bilabial		Dental/ Alveolar	Post- alveolar	Palatal	Velar		Glottal	Unspecified
		plain	pal.	Dental/ Alveolar	Post- alveolar	Palatal	plain	pal.	Glottal	Unspecified
Plosive	voiceless	p	pʲ	t			k	kʲ		
Plosive	aspirated			tʰ						
Affricate	voiceless			ts	tʃ					
Affricate	aspirated			tsʰ	tʃʰ					
Fricative				s	ʃ	(ç)			h	
Rhotic				r	rʲ					
Nasal		m	mʲ	n		ɲ				N
Approximant		β̞	β̞ʲ			j	ɰ			

David Payne (1981) shows the same inventory for the Apurucayali variety, but without the palatalized consonants /pʲ/, /kʲ/, /hʲ/, /mʲ/ and /β̞ʲ/ and with the palatal fricative /ç/.

Mihas shows a similar inventory for the Alto Perené variety with few differences. These are that Mihas does not include neither /tʰ/ nor /ç/; David Payne's contrast /t͡ʃ~t͡ʃʰ/ is considered /t͡ʃ~tʲ/ by Mihas, and she does not include any palatalized consonant because she considers them two-consonant clusters (Cj). These three varieties are included in Pedrós' Northern Ashé-Ashá group.

=== Vowels ===
Judith Payne, Mihas and Pedrós show a four-vowel system /a/, /e/, /i/, /o/, while, in David Payne's Apurucayali, there are only three /a/, /i/, /o/. All varieties distinguish between long [Vː] and short vowels without any change in quality.

== Alphabet ==
Ashéninka was recognized as a separate language from Asháninka in 2017, and the process to fix an alphabet finished in April 2019 with its approval by the Ministry of Education.
