= Yaneshaʼ language =

Arawakan language spoken in Peru

Yaneshaʼ
- Amuesha
- Yaneshac̈h/Yanešač̣
- Pronunciation: [janeʃaˀt͡ʂʰ]
- Native to: Peru
- Region: Department of Pasco
- Ethnicity: Yaneshaʼ
- Native speakers: (9,800 cited 2000)
- Language family: Arawakan: Yaneshaʼ
- Writing system: Latin

Language codes
- ISO 639-3: ame
- Glottolog: yane1238
- ELP: Amuesha

Yaneshaʼ (Yaneshac̈h/Yanešač̣ 'we the people'), also called Amuesha or Amoesha, is a language spoken by the Amuesha people of Peru in central and eastern Pasco Region.

== Phonology ==
Yaneshaʼ has 26 consonants and 9 vowel phonemes. The consonants have a certain degree of allophonic variation while that of the vowels is more considerable.

=== Consonants ===
		Bilabial		Alveolar		Retroflex	Palatal		Velar	
		plain	pal.	plain	pal.	Retroflex	plain	pal.	plain	pal.
Nasal		m ⟨m⟩	mʲ ⟨m̃⟩	n ⟨n⟩	nʲ ⟨ñ⟩				(ŋ) ^{2}	
Plosive		p ⟨p⟩	pʲ ⟨p̃⟩	t ⟨t⟩					k ⟨c/qu⟩	kʲ ⟨c̃⟩
Affricate ^{1}				t͡s ⟨ts⟩		t͡ʂ ⟨c̈h⟩	t͡ʃ ⟨ch⟩	t͡ʃʲ ⟨t̃⟩^{1}		
Fricative	voiceless			s ⟨s⟩			ʃ ⟨sh⟩		x ⟨j⟩	xʲ ⟨j̃⟩
Fricative	voiced	β ⟨b⟩	βʲ ⟨b̃⟩			ʐ ⟨rr⟩			ɣ ⟨g⟩	ɣʲ ⟨guë⟩
Liquid				ɾ ⟨r⟩	lʲ ⟨ll⟩					
Semivowel							j ⟨y⟩		w ⟨hu/u⟩	

1. The affricates and /t͡ʃʲ/ are phonetically aspirated
2. [ŋ] is an allophone of /n/ before /k/

Yaneshaʼ, similar to languages like Russian, Irish, and Marshallese, makes contrasts between certain pairs of palatalized and plain consonants:

- anajp̃ /aˈnaxpʲ/ 'he answered him' vs. anajp /aˈnaxp/ 'he answered'
- esho'ta netsorram̃o /eˈʃota netsoˈʐamʲo/ 'entered my saw' vs. esho'ta nenamo /eˈʃota neˈnamo/ 'entered my mouth'
- ña /nʲa/ 'he' vs. na /na/ 'I'

The remaining two palatalized consonants, /lʲ/ and /t͡ʃʲ/, do not offer a one-to-one contrast with plain consonants; the former because it is the only lateral consonant and so contrasts with no other phoneme on the basis of just palatalization; /t͡ʃʲ/, while contrasting with /t/, also contrasts with /ts/, /tʃ/, and /tʂ/. The bilabial palatalized consonants have a more perceptible palatal offglide than the alveolar ones. Word-finally, this offglide is voiceless for /pʲ/ and /lʲ/ while being absent for /mʲ/.

Another general feature of Yaneshaʼ is devoicing in certain contexts. In addition to the devoicing of palatal offglides above, the retroflex fricative /ʐ/ is voiceless when word final (final devoicing) or before a voiceless consonant (regressive assimilation): arrpa /ˈaʐpa/ 'here it is' → [ˈaʂpa]. The approximants /w/ and /j/ are voiceless before voiceless stops, as in huautena /wawˈteːna/ 'barks' and neytarr /nejˈtaʐ/ 'my door'; /j/ is also voiceless before affricates and word-finally: ahuey /aˈwej/ 'let's go'.

Similarly, the stops /p/, t/, and /k/ are aspirated word-finally ellap /eˈlʲap/ 'shotgun' → [eˈlʲapʰ]; preceding another stop or an affricate, a stop may be aspirated or unreleased so that etquëll /eːtˈkelʲ/ ('a fish') is realized as [eetʰkelʲ] or [eetkelʲ]. The velar fricative /x/ is debuccalized to [h] before another consonant.

=== Vowels ===
Yaneshaʼ has three basic vowel qualities, /a/, /e/, and /o/. Each contrasts phonemically between short, long, and "laryngeal" or glottalized forms as /aˀ eˀ oˀ/.

Laryngealization generally consists of glottalization of the vowel in question, creating a kind of creaky voice. In pre-final contexts, a variation occurs—especially before voiced consonants—ranging from creaky phonation throughout the vowel to a sequence of a vowel, glottal stop, and a slightly rearticulated vowel: ma'ñorr /maˀˈnʲoʐ/ 'deer' → [maʔa̯ˈnʲoʂ]. Before a word-final nasal, this rearticulated vowel may be realized as a syllabic quality of said nasal. Also, although not as long as a phonemically long vowel, laryngeal vowels are generally longer than short ones. When absolutely word-final, laryngealized vowels differ from short ones only by the presence of a following glottal stop.

Each vowel varies in its phonetic qualities, having contextual allophones as well as phones in free variation with each other:

/e/ is the short phoneme consisting of phones that are front and close to close-mid. Generally, it is realized as close [i] when following bilabial consonants. Otherwise, the phones [e] and [ɪ] are in free variation with each other so that /nexˈse/ ('my brother') may be realized as either [nehˈse] or [nehˈsɪ].

/eː/ is the long counterpart to /e/. It differs almost solely in its length, although when it follows /k/ it becomes a sort of diphthong with the first element being identical in vowel height while being more retracted so that quë' /keː/ 'large kind of parrot' is realized as [ke̠e].

Laryngeal /eˀ/ consists of the same variation and allophony of the short phoneme with the minor exception that it is more likely to be realized as close following /p/ as in pe'sherr /peˀˈʃeːʐ/ 'parakeet' → [piˀˈʃeeʂ].

/a/ is the short phoneme consisting of phones that are central. Its most frequent realization is that of an open central unrounded vowel [ä] (represented hereafter without the centralizing diacritic). Before /k/, there is free variation between this and [ə] so that nanac /naˈnakʰ/ 'exceedingly' may be realized as [naˈnakʰ] or [nanˈəkʰ]. While the laryngeal counterpart is qualitatively identical to the short, the long counterpart, /aː/, differs only in that [ə] is not a potential realization.

/o/ is the short phoneme consisting of phones that are back as well as rounded. Generally, [o] and [u] are in free variation so that oyua /ojoˈwa/ 'wild pig' may be realized as [ojoˈwa] or [ujuˈwa]. The phone [ʊ] is another potential realization, although it most frequently occurs before stops so that not /not/ 'my hand' may be realized as [nʊtʰ]. [ʊ] is not a potential realization of long /oː/ but both the long and laryngeal counterparts are otherwise qualitatively identical to short /o/.

=== Phonotactics ===
All consonants appear initially, medially, and finally with the exception that /ɣ/ and /w/ do not occur word-finally. With two exceptions (/tsʐ/ and /mw/), initial clusters include at least one stop. The other possible initial clusters are:

- /pw/, /pr/, /tr/, /kj/
- /tʃp/, /ʐp/, /tʃt/, /ʃt/

Word final clusters consist of either a nasal or /x/ followed by a plosive or affricate:

- /mp/, /nt/, /nk/, /ntʲ/, /ntʃ/, /ntʂ/

Medial clusters may be of two or three consonants.

=== Stress ===
Although apparently phonemic, stress tends to occur on the penultimate syllable but also in the ultimate. Less frequently, it is antepenultimate. Some words, like oc̈hen /ˈotʂen/~/oˈtʂen/ 'comb', have stress in free variation.

== Lexicography ==
A Yaneshaʼ Talking Dictionary was produced by Living Tongues Institute for Endangered Languages.

== Vocabulary ==
=== Loanwords ===
Due to the influence and domination of the Inca Empire, Yaneshaʼ has many loanwords from Quechua, including some core vocabulary. Yaneshaʼ may also have been influenced by Quechua's vowel system so that, today, it has a three-vowel system rather than a four-vowel one that is typical of related Arawakan languages. There are also many loanwords from Kampa languages.
