= Yanesha people =

Yaneshaʼ
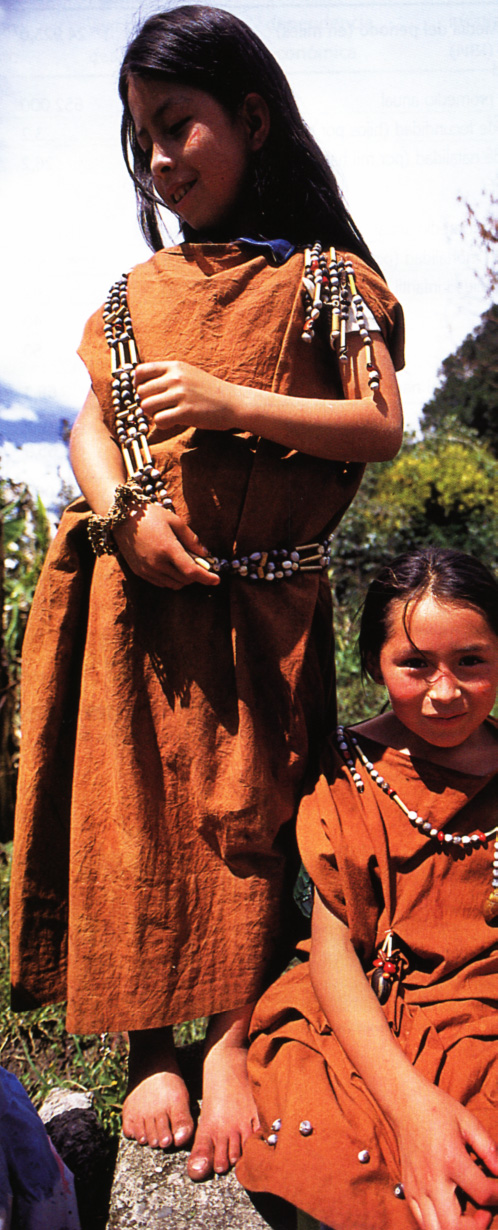
- Yaneshaʼ girls of the Peruvian Amazon

Total population
- 10,000 (2000)

Regions with significant populations
- Peru

Languages
- Yanesha, Spanish

Religion
- traditional tribal religion

The Yaneshaʼ or Amuesha people are an ethnic group of the Peruvian Amazon rainforest. Presently, the most recent census count puts their population at over 7,000 distributed among 48 communities located in Puerto Inca Province (Huánuco), Chanchamayo Province (Junín) and Oxapampa Province (Pasco). They are a relatively small group, making up barely 2.91% of indigenous inhabitants located in the Peruvian Amazon. Their communities are situated in altitudes ranging from 200 to 1600 meters above sea level and can also be found along the shores of various rivers including the Pichis, Palcazu, Pachitea, Huancabamba, Cacazú, Chorobamba, and the Yurinaqui Rivers.

== Name ==
The Yaneshaʼ are also known as Amage, Amagues, Amaje, Amajo, Amoishe, Amueixa, Amuese, Amuesha, Amuetamo, Lorenzo, and Omage.

== Language ==
The Yanesha people speak Yaneshaʼ, a language belonging to the Maipurean language family that also includes Asháninka, Yine, and others. A dictionary and grammar have been published in Yaneshaʼ, which is written in the Latin script.

== History ==
The tribe's first contact with non-native people came through friars who, in the second half of the 16th century, made an incursion into the region. However, it was not until the 18th century that missionaries (this time Franciscans) managed to establish steady relations with the Yaneshaʼ and other ethnic groups living nearby. Father Francisco de San José founded various missions around Cerro de la Sal (Villa Rica District) and Quimiri (La Merced, Junin) to convert the indigenous populations to Christianity. However, in 1742, indigenous people commanded by Juan Santos Atahualpa rebelled against the Spaniards and destroyed a number of missions, effectively cutting off outside contact for several decades.

It is not known for sure the population of the Yaneshaʼ people at this time but they had certainly already begun to die off from European diseases. During the 19th century, the area inhabited by the Yaneshaʼ and other groups was reexplored by expeditions looking to establish routes to the lower Amazon and to colonize the area.

The arrival of westerners represented for the Yaneshaʼ the loss of land and a dramatic change of living customs ensued; they were grouped into towns and their extensive territories became the property of colonists. With this situation, they were compelled to group together and became the first ethnic group to form a professional organization: the Amuesha Congress. This later became the Yaneshaʼ Federation. The Law of Indigenous Communities (sp: La Ley de Comunidades Indígenas), promulgated in 1974, partly repaired the situation of dispossession by granting some land to Yaneshaʼ groups.

The Yaneshaʼ people once lived through hunting, fishing, and subsistence agriculture; in modern times, the emphasis is on agricultural diversification and cultivation of cash crops like coffee and annatto. Hunting became much rarer after the Yaneshaʼ people began raising animals for consumption. In addition, groups have begun exploiting Cat's claw. The marketing of ceramic crafts has also become a source of income.

In 1988, a territory of over 34,774 hectares was set up in Palcazu District as the Yaneshaʼ Communal Reservation (Reserva Communal Yaneshaʼ) with the purpose of protecting important fauna that serves as sustenance to Yaneshaʼ communities in the area.

== Notable people ==
- Teresita Antazú (born 1960), leader of the Union of Ashaninka-Yanesha Nationalities since 2006, becoming the first female cornesha.
