= Timóteo (municipality) =

Municipality in Minas Gerais, Brazil

- Municipality
- Municipality of Timóteo
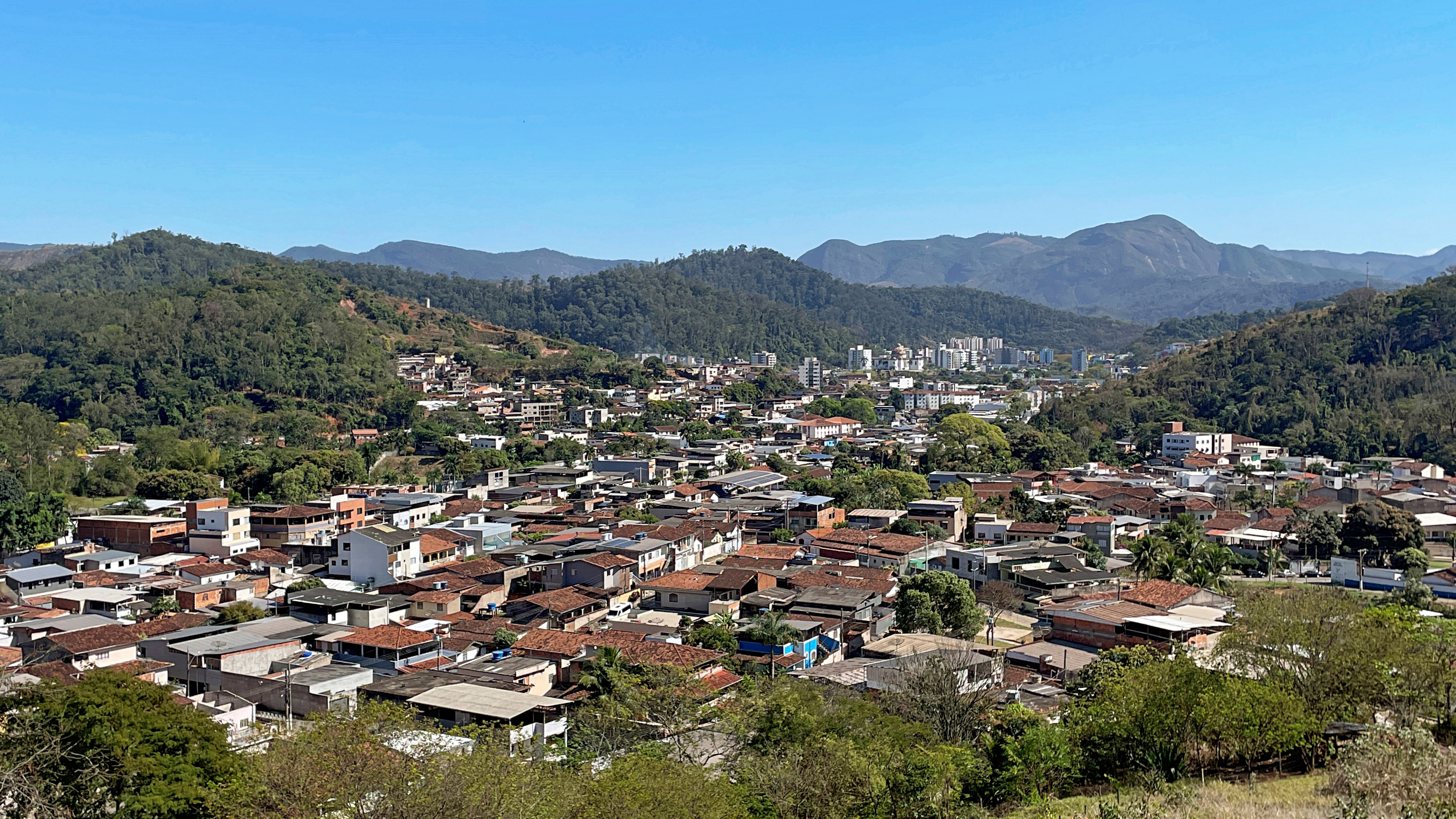
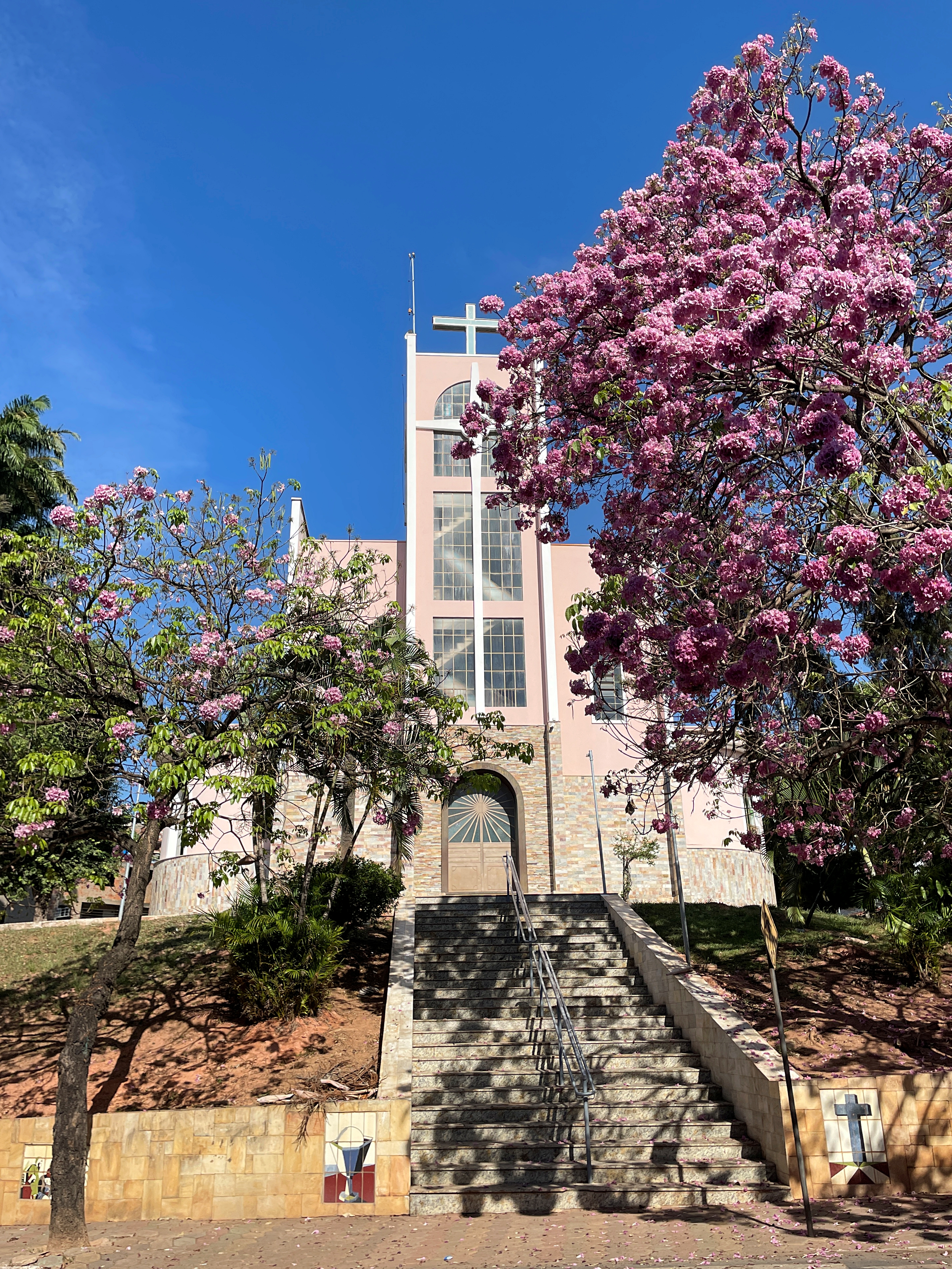
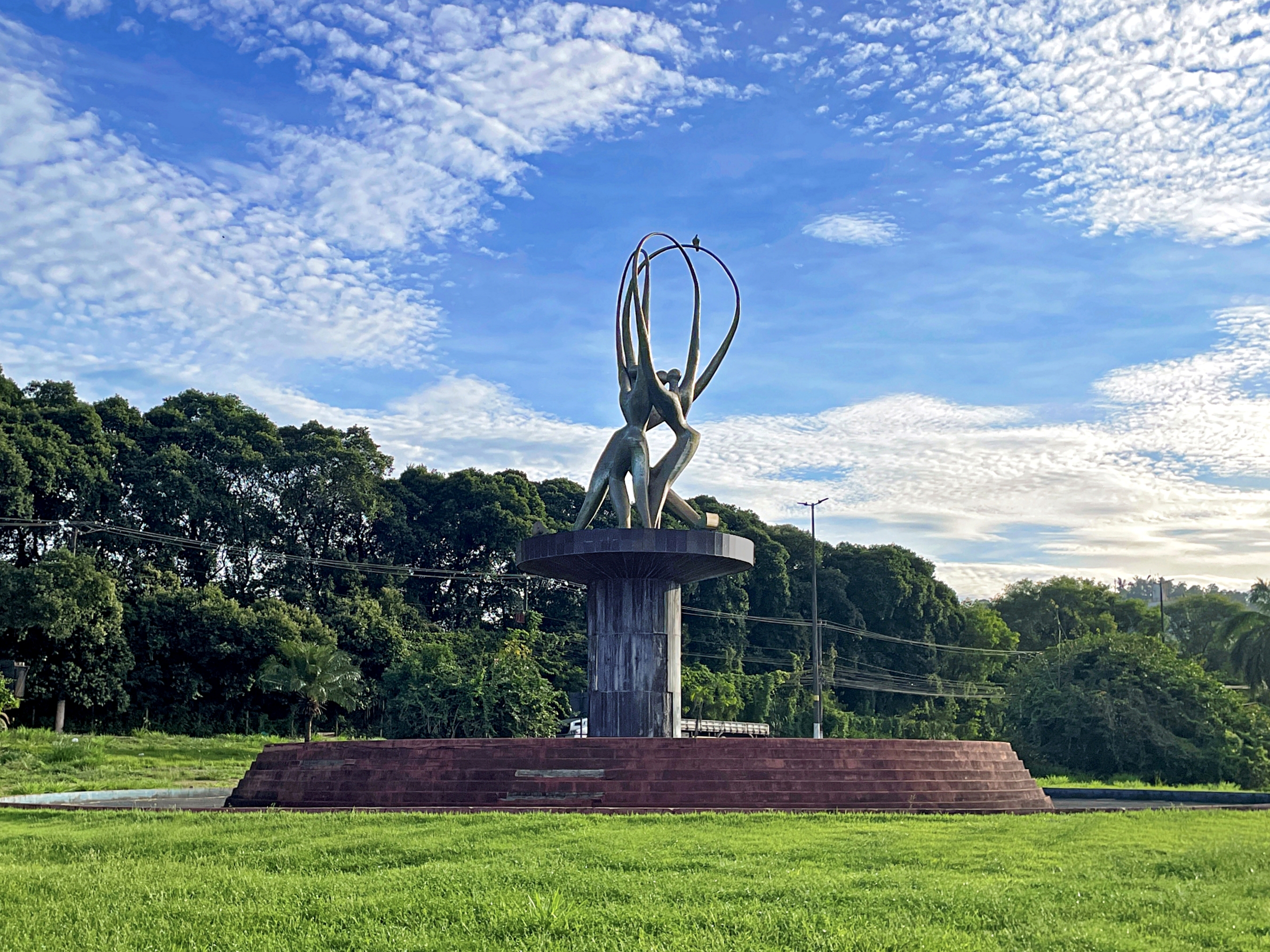
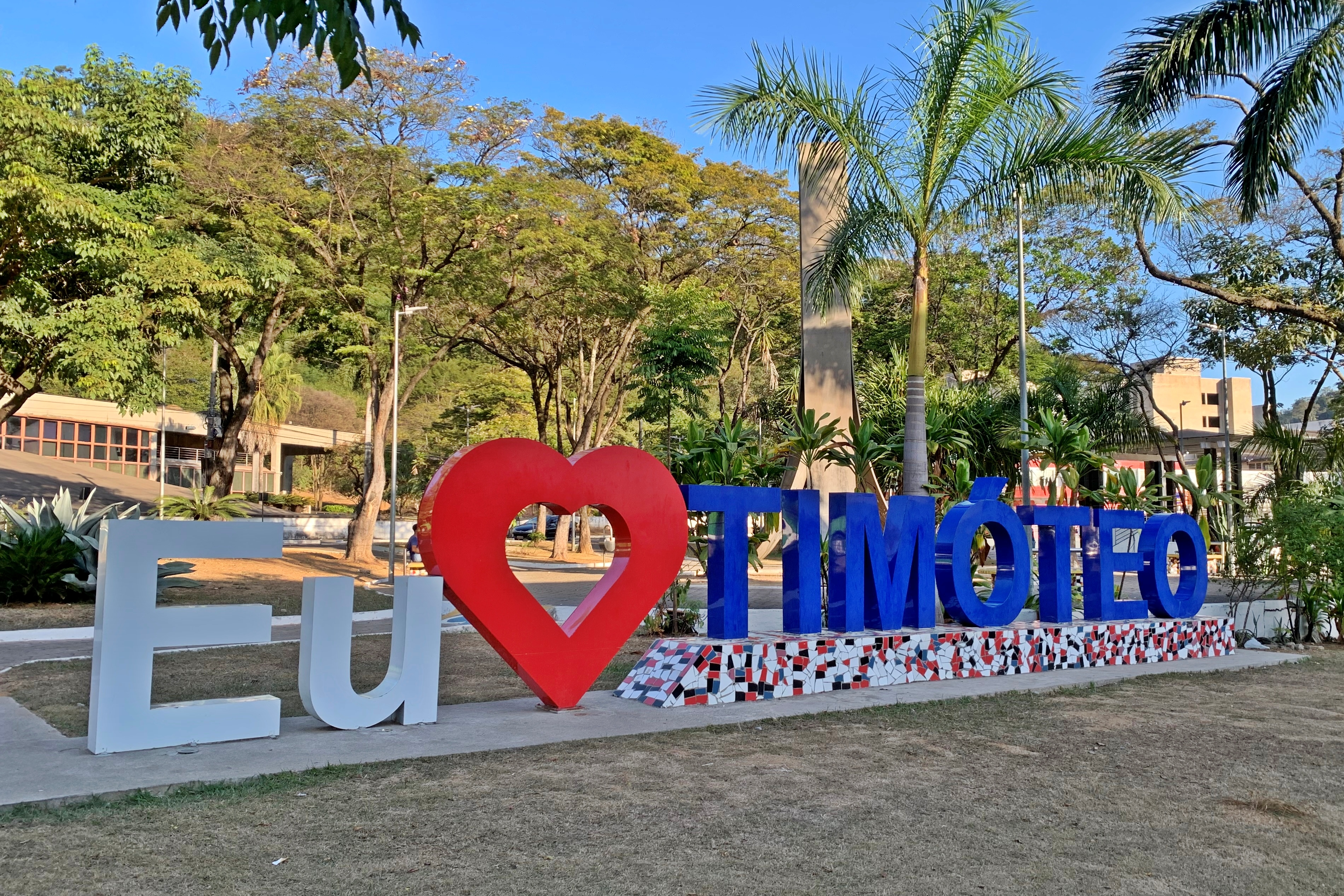
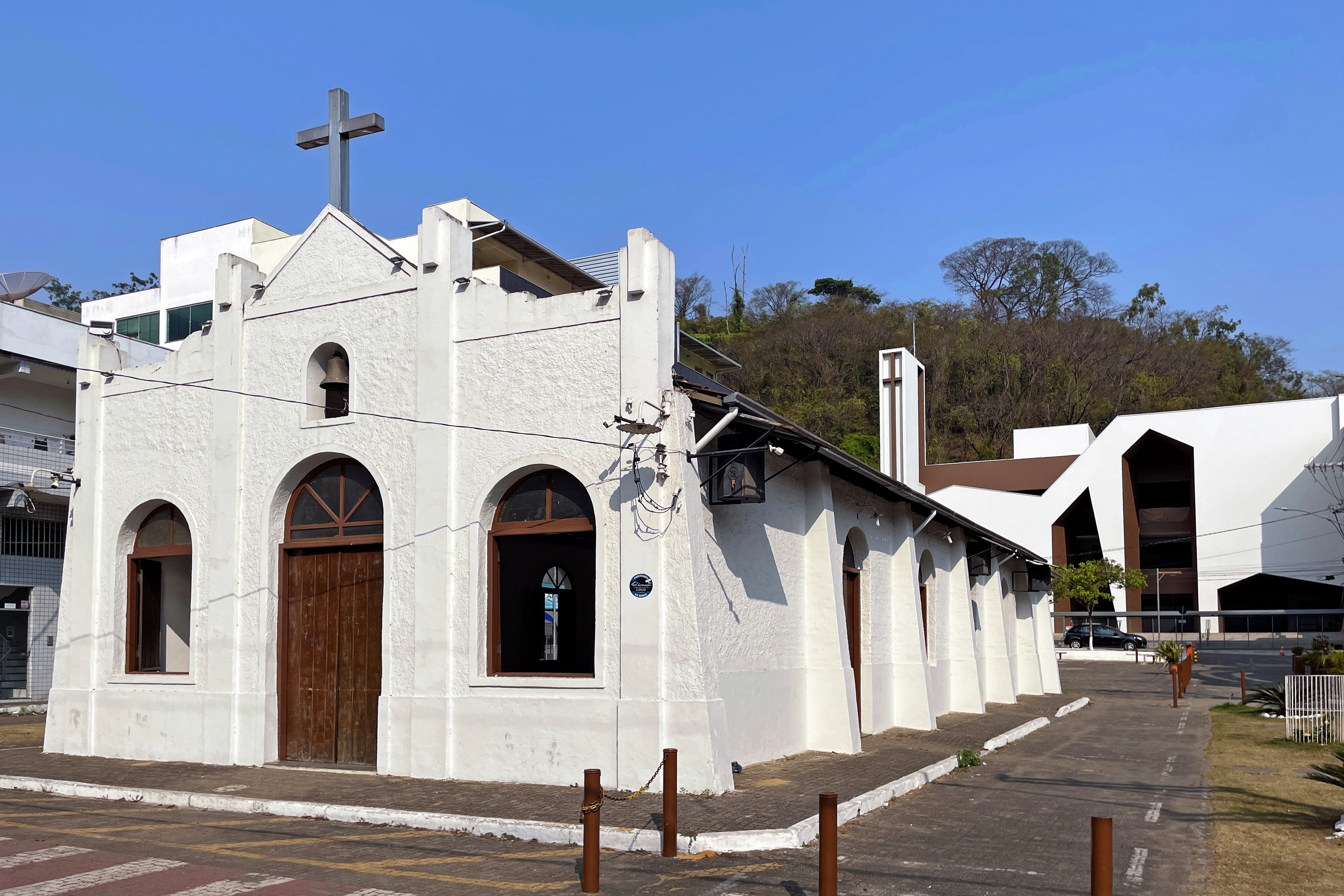
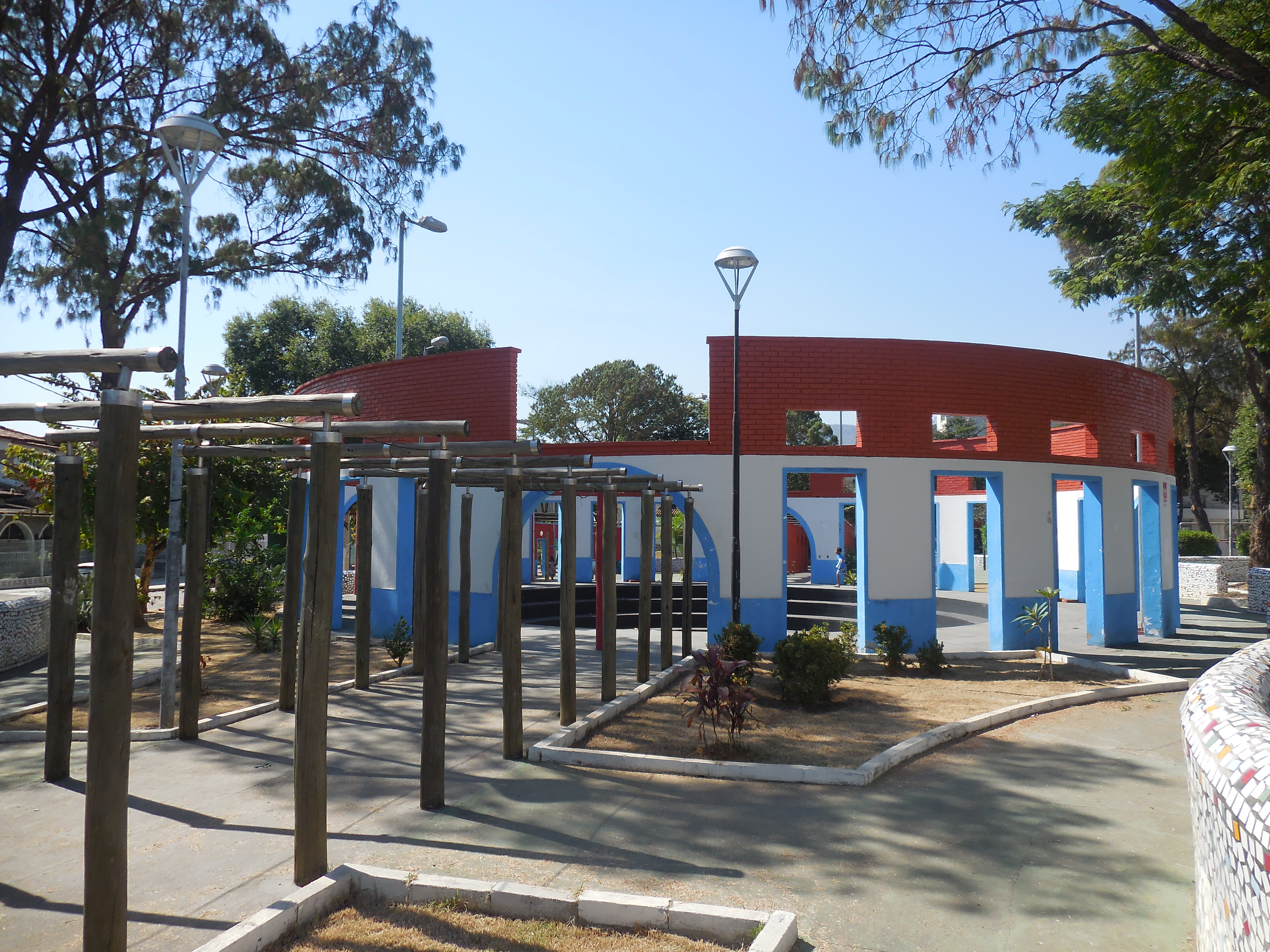
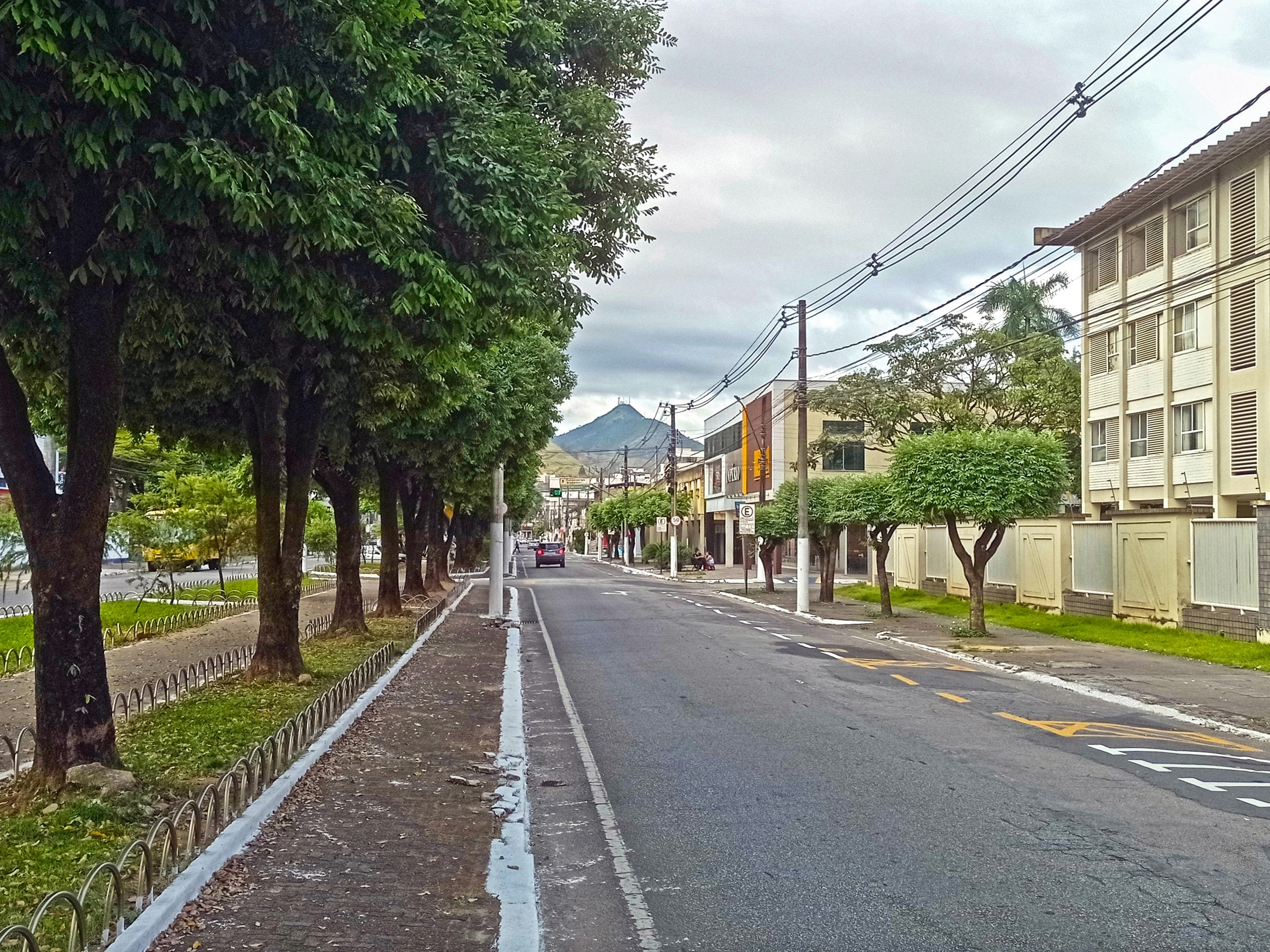
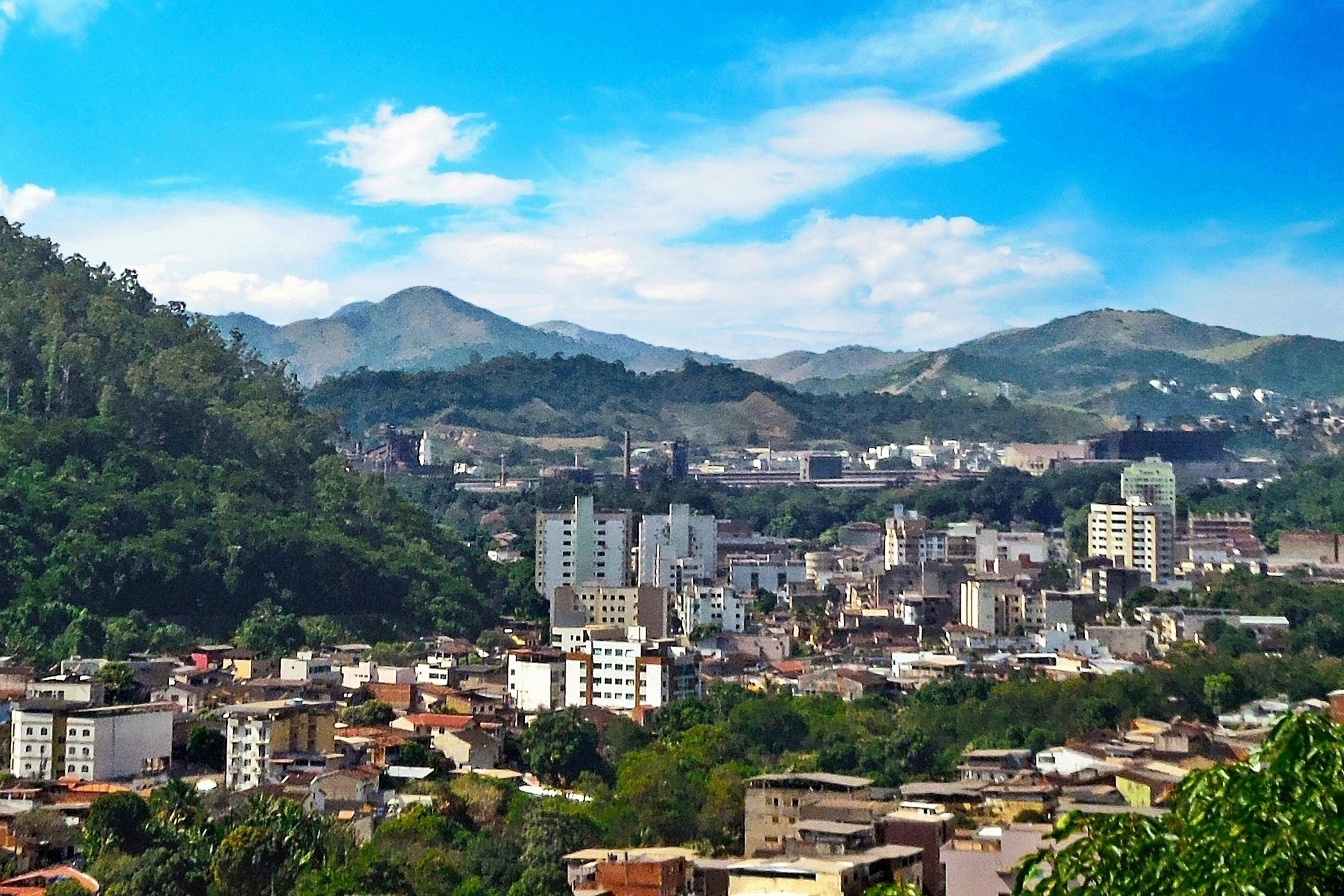
- From top to bottom, left to right: Partial view of Timóteo from the Primavera neighborhood; the Saint Sebastian Matriz Church; Synergy Monument; "I Love Timóteo" sign in 1 May Square (Centro-Norte); the Saint Joseph the Worker Church of Acesita with the Our Lady of Mount Carmel Church (new church) in the background; Coliseu Square; 31 October Avenue with Ana Moura peak in the background; and a partial view of the Centro-Norte region with the Aperam plant in the background.

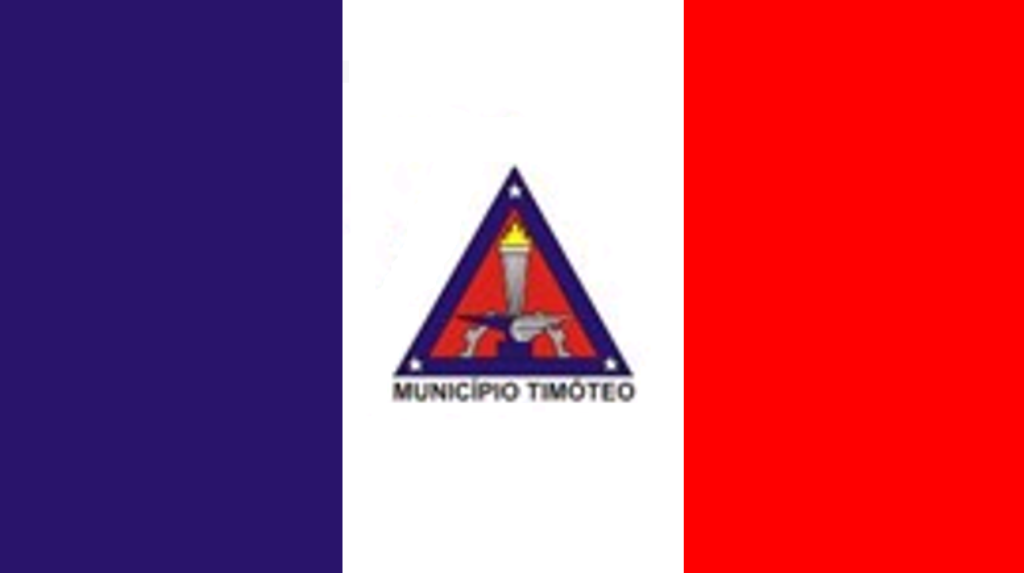
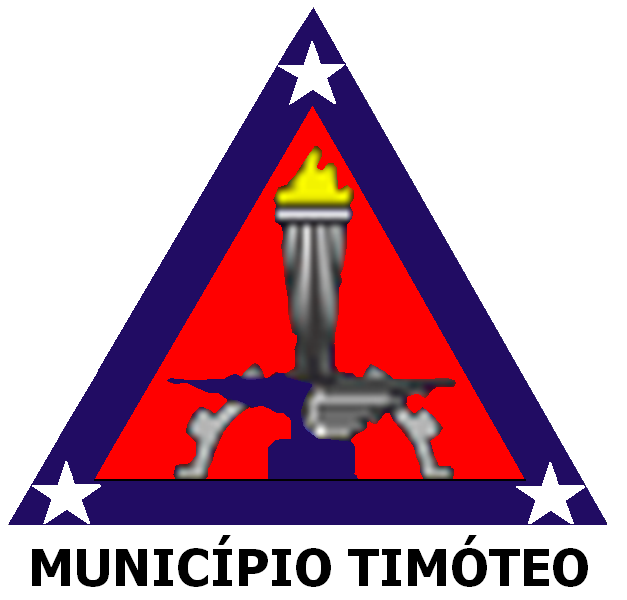
- Flag Coat of arms
- Nickname: "A Capital do Inox" (Stainless Steel Capital)

- Location within Brazil
- Coordinates: 19°34′58″S 42°38′38″W
- Country: Brazil
- Region: Southeast
- State: Minas Gerais
- Metropolitan region: Vale do Aço
- Founded: 29 April 1964

Government
  - Mayor: Vitor Vicente do Prado (Republicans)
  - Term ends: 2028

Area
  - Municipality: 144.381 km^{2} (55.746 sq mi)
  - Urban: 18.13 km^{2} (7.00 sq mi)
- Elevation: 350 m (1,150 ft)

Population (IBGE Census 2022)
  - Municipality: 81,579
  - Estimate (IBGE/2024): 84,087
  - Rank: MG: 45th
- Demonym: Timotense
- Time zone: UTC−3 (BRT)
- HDI (PNUD/2010): 0.770
- GDP (IBGE/2021): R$5,611,338.76
- GDP per capita (IBGE/2021): R$61,482.00
- Distance to capital: 196 km
- Districts: Cachoeira do Vale and Timóteo (seat)
- Neighboring municipalities: West: Antônio Dias; North: Ipatinga and Coronel Fabriciano; East: Caratinga and Bom Jesus do Galho; Southwest: Jaguaraçu; South: Marliéria.
- Climate: Tropical wet and dry climate (Aw)
- Website: timoteo.mg.gov.br

Timóteo is a Brazilian municipality located in the interior of the state of Minas Gerais, in the Southeast Region of Brazil. Situated in the Vale do Rio Doce, it is part of the Vale do Aço Metropolitan Region and lies approximately 200 kilometres (120 mi) east of the state capital, Belo Horizonte. The municipality covers an area of just over 140 square kilometres (54 sq mi), with 18 square kilometres (6.9 sq mi) classified as urban, and its population was estimated at 84,087 inhabitants in 2024.

The settlement of Timóteo began in the mid-19th century when Francisco de Paula e Silva acquired three sesmarias in the region and established himself in one, located in the present-day Alegre neighborhood near the Timóteo Stream. Francisco developed agriculture and cattle raising, fostering the formation of a village later named São Sebastião do Alegre. In 1938, the area became a district under Antônio Dias, already bearing the name Timóteo. In the following decade, it was selected as the site for the industrial hub of Acesita, now known as Aperam South America. This development was facilitated by the ease of receiving raw materials and transportation via the Vitória-Minas Railway, the availability of water from the Piracicaba River, and wood in the vast local forests. In 1948, Timóteo was annexed to the municipality of Coronel Fabriciano.

At Acesita's request, a workers' village was constructed parallel to the original urban core, but its growth spurred Timóteo's emancipation in 1964. This led to the city being divided into two distinct clusters: one comprising neighborhoods built by the company around the Centro-Norte, still referred to as "Acesita" despite the company’s name change, and the other stemming from the original settlements in the Centro-Sul, known as "Timóteo." Although the service sector has grown, industry remains the main source of municipal revenue, and its presence has contributed to the formation of the Vale do Aço Metropolitan Region, one of the main urban centers in the state's interior.

Approximately 35% of Timóteo’s area is protected by the Rio Doce State Park, the largest Atlantic Forest reserve in Minas Gerais. The city is known for traditions such as handicrafts, samba schools, and congado, as well as attractions such as the Ana Moura Peak; the São José Operário Church, built by Acesita for the religious activities of the former workers' village; and the 29 de Abril and 1º de Maio squares, key leisure and event venues in the region. Through the Aperam Acesita Foundation, Aperam South America maintains a cultural center featuring a theater, a museum, and spaces for exhibitions, courses, and theater classes, while also offering workshops in schools and public areas.

== History ==
=== Colonization of the region ===
Exploration of the region, initially known as the Sertões do Rio Doce, began in the late 16th century with expeditions seeking precious metals. However, settlement was restricted in the early 17th century to prevent gold smuggling from areas near Diamantina. Colonization was permitted in 1755, but the presence of indigenous groups in the Vale do Rio Doce posed challenges to development. To protect settlers, "quarters" were established in the early 19th century under the "4th Division of Rio Doce," which included the current municipality. The area was home to the Borun (also called Botocudos) indigenous people, who inhabited the vast local Atlantic Forest. In 1820, the region, then known as Alegre, was under the Onça Pequena Quarter, headquartered in Jaguaraçu. During this period, Guido Marlière, the commander of the Rio Doce divisions, encouraged the catechesis of indigenous groups in eastern Minas Gerais in order to facilitate colonization and avoid systematic extermination.

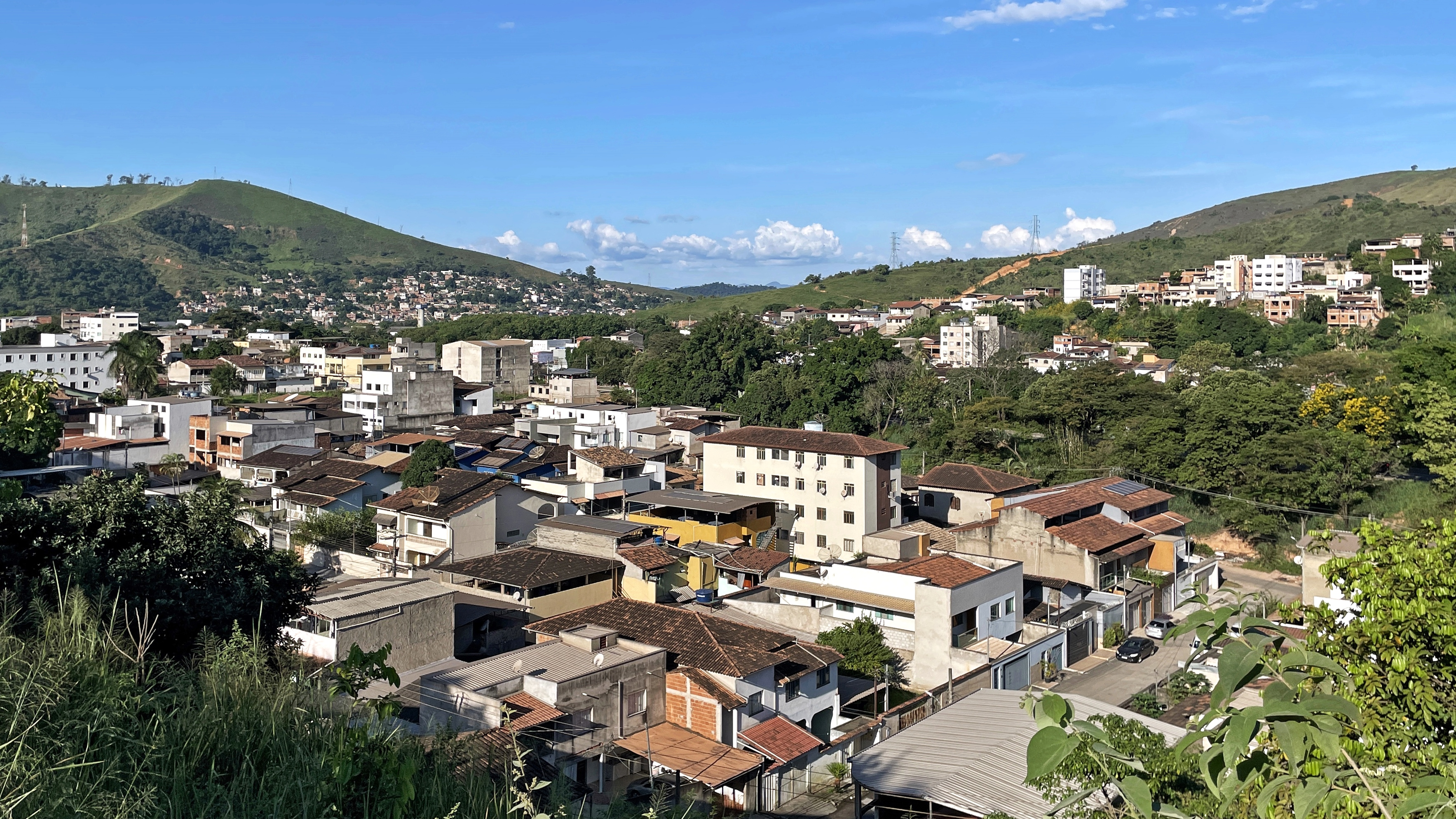
The Alegre neighborhood, where the settlement of the current municipality began.

Despite a ban on attacks against indigenous peoples in 1831, they were nearly extinct in the Vale do Rio Doce by 1832, as documented, encouraging further settlement and colonization. On September 11, 1831, Francisco de Paula e Silva (known as Chico Santa Maria, from Santa Maria de Itabira) arrived with his family and numerous slaves, settling near the present-day Alegre neighborhood. Chico Santa Maria received three sesmarias (Alegre, Limoeiro, and Timóteo) in the region along the watercourse he named "Timóteo Stream," where he developed agriculture and cattle raising and hosted tropeiros seeking rest. The name "Timóteo" is attributed to a tropeiro who settled in the area and opened a store that became a key reference point, also known as the "Paragem do Ribeirão do Timóteo." Another account suggests that a pioneer honored his European nephew, Timóteo.

By around 1840, Alegre had solidified as a village and was annexed to the Freguesia of Santana do Alfié. Over the next few decades, Manoel Archanjo de Andrade (around 1855), Antônio Pacífico Fraga (1877), and the brothers João and Manoel Lino de Sá from Joanésia (who acquired land from José Luiz de Paula, heir of Francisco de Paula e Silva, in 1885) purchased land. The holdings of the deceased Chico Santa Maria were divided among his children and grandchildren in 1890. In 1895, Manoel Berto de Lima founded the Our Lady of the Rosary Congado Group. In 1907, Francisco Malachias donated land dedicated to Saint Sebastian at the site of the current 29 de Abril Square in Centro-Sul, used to build a small wooden church, leading the settlement to be known as São Sebastião do Alegre.

=== Urban formation ===
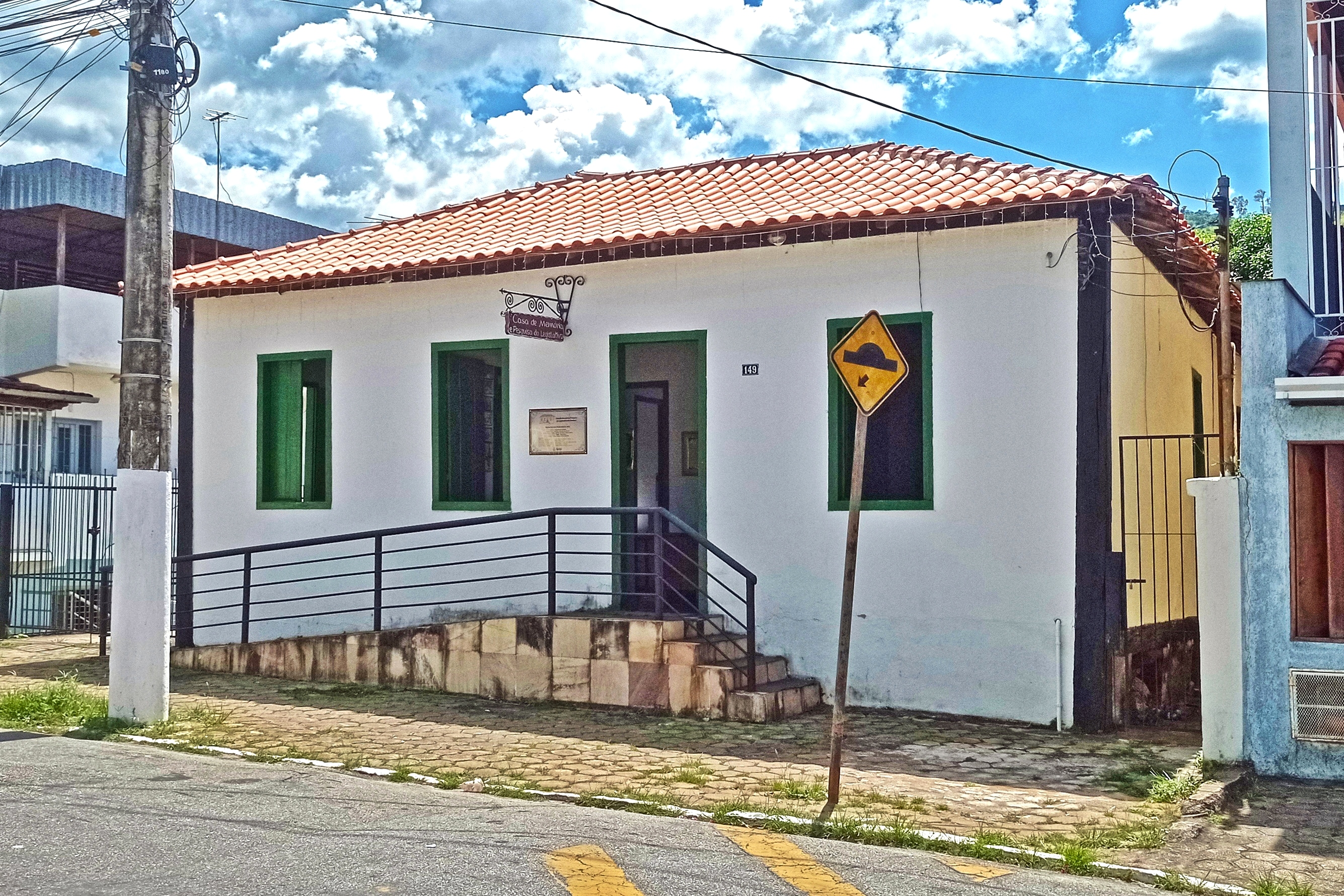
The house on Mateus Araújo Street, also known as the House of Memory, was built in 1922 in the Centro-Sul area.

The construction of the Vitória-Minas Railway (EFVM) in eastern Minas Gerais spurred population growth near the railway during the 1910s and 1920s. In 1921, pharmacist Raimundo Alves de Carvalho settled in the current Horto neighborhood in Ipatinga to support the construction of the railway. Raimundo acquired land in São Sebastião do Alegre, donating a plot for the construction of the village’s first school, the São Sebastião do Alegre Mixed Rural School, in 1922, the same year the first post office was established. In 1925, the Timotinho Municipal Mixed School was inaugurated in the Ana Moura neighborhood, also on land donated by the pharmacist. Both schools were later incorporated into the Dona Angelina Alves School (now Angelina Alves de Carvalho Municipal School), named after Raimundo’s mother. Meanwhile, the village was incorporated into the district of São José do Grama (now Jaguaraçu), created on September 7, 1923, then part of São Domingos do Prata. In 1928, the pharmacist established the Dona Angelina Farm near the village, along the Piracicaba River.

In the early 1930s, an office of the Belgo-Mineira Steel Company was established in Coronel Fabriciano to centralize timber extraction and charcoal production in the Rio Doce region to fuel its furnaces in João Monlevade. This led to large-scale land negotiations for timber extraction, resulting in extensive deforestation. Concerned about preserving the native Atlantic Forest, Bishop Helvécio Gomes de Oliveira spearheaded the creation of the Rio Doce State Park in 1944, the first conservation unit in Minas Gerais. By state decree No. 148 of December 17, 1938, the former São Sebastião do Alegre village ceased to belong to Jaguaraçu and was elevated to district status, annexed to Antônio Dias under the name "Timóteo." Its establishment occurred on January 1, 1940, with Joaquim Ferreira de Souza as the first justice of the peace.

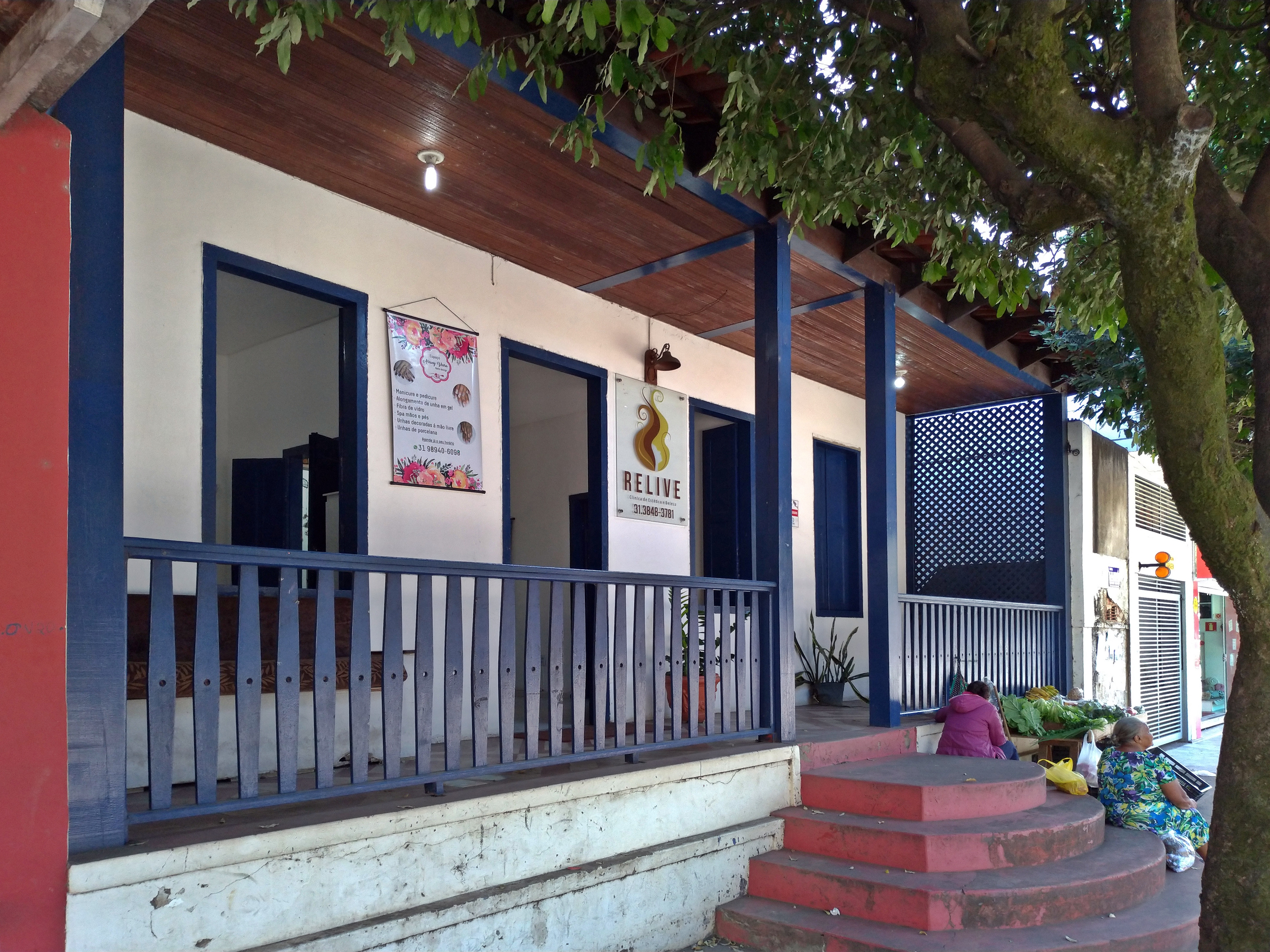
Former Dona Angelina Farm headquarters, used as a commercial point in Centro-Norte, photographed in 2019 (demolished in 2022).

The area benefited from Vitória-Minas Railway stops at the Baratinha (opened June 9, 1924), Ana Matos (August 26, 1925), and Sá Carvalho (August 26, 1925) stations. The availability of the railway, watercourses, and timber for extraction were decisive factors in studies by Itabira Iron, led by Percival Farquhar and entrepreneurs Amyntas Jacques de Moraes and Athos de Lemos Rache, which identified Timóteo as the optimal location for their steel complex, leading to the founding of Acesita (Aços Especiais Itabira) on October 31, 1944. A loan from the Banco do Brasil secured the project’s consolidation. On June 3, 1947, the Acesita Station was inaugurated and served by Vitória-Minas Railway stops.

Originally, Itabira was designated to host the complex, but its rugged terrain made it unfeasible. Iron ore extracted in Itabira could be transported to Timóteo via the railway, which also facilitated connections to port complexes on the Espírito Santo coast. The chosen site for the factory was the Dona Angelina Farm, purchased from Raimundo Alves de Carvalho. A planned industrial village for 2,000 inhabitants was also envisioned, while the village had only 200 residents. The urban project was designed by engineer Romeu Duffles Teixeira in 1946, though not fully implemented as planned. On December 27, 1948, the Timóteo district was incorporated into the newly emancipated municipality of Coronel Fabriciano, driven by the momentum from Acesita’s arrival.

=== Economic expansion and emancipation ===
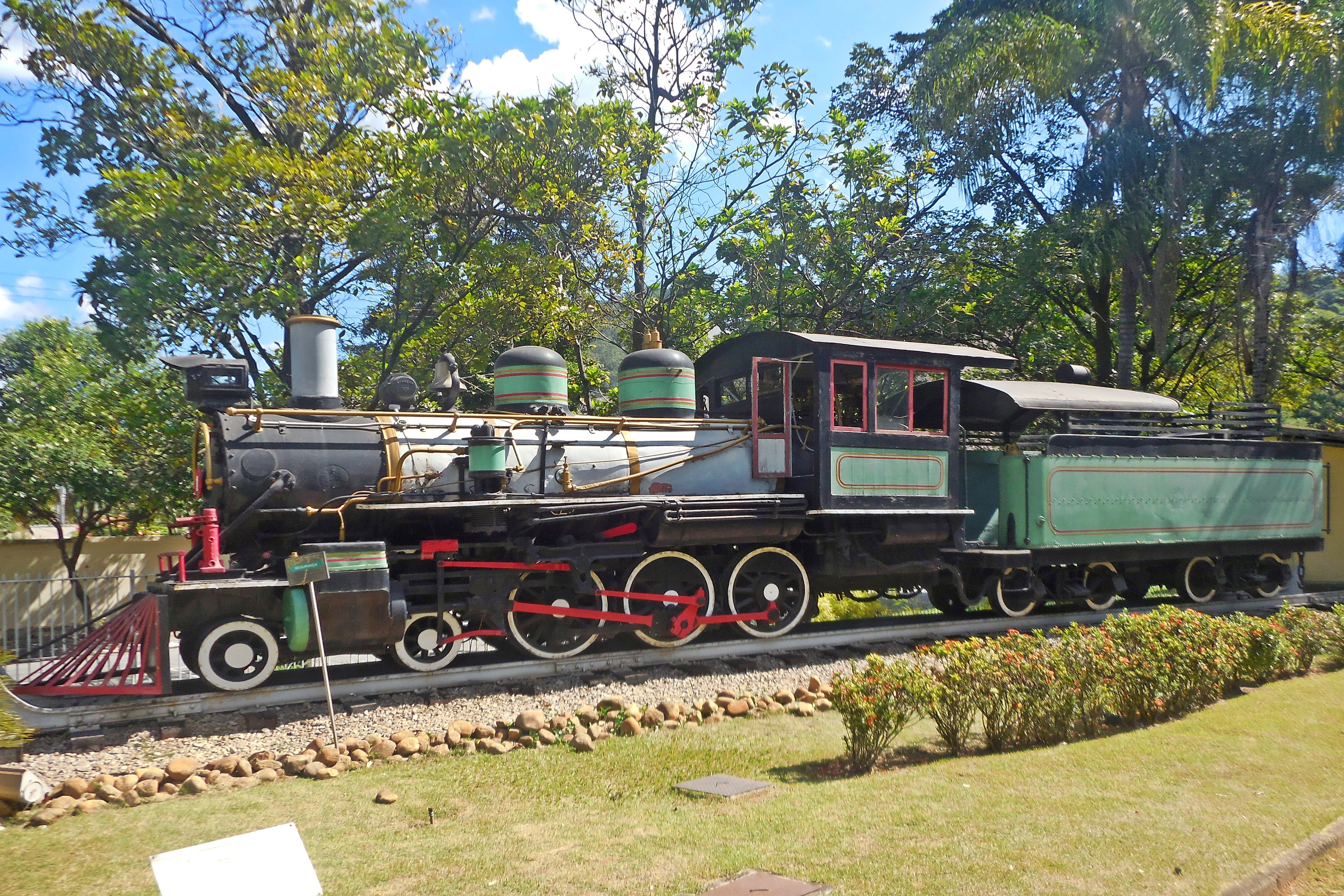
First locomotive used by Acesita (now Aperam South America), displayed at the Aperam Acesita Foundation.

Acesita’s establishment attracted workers and employees from across Brazil and immigrants, solidifying the urbanization of both Timóteo and neighboring Coronel Fabriciano. In the following years, the company built several residential complexes for its employees, giving rise to neighborhoods such as Quitandinha (the oldest), Bromélias, Funcionários, Vila dos Técnicos, and Olaria. In 1949, Acesita produced its first pig iron run. Its presence catalyzed the industrial development of the Vale do Aço, reinforced by the establishment of Usiminas in the Fabriciano district of Ipatinga in the late 1950s.

By 1950, with a population of 11,813 people, Timóteo gained access to treated water, and in 1952, the Acesita Hospital was established, later renamed Vital Brazil Hospital and Maternity and then Hospital and Maternity of Timóteo. By 1958, the company had built 2,734 residences, but in 1964, it began charging workers for housing. Neighborhoods reflected employee hierarchies; for instance, the Funcionários neighborhood was reserved for doctors, engineers, and managers, located closer to the plant with relatively higher-quality housing. Beyond schools, the company built sports courts and clubs, hosting tournaments, dances, and theater performances.

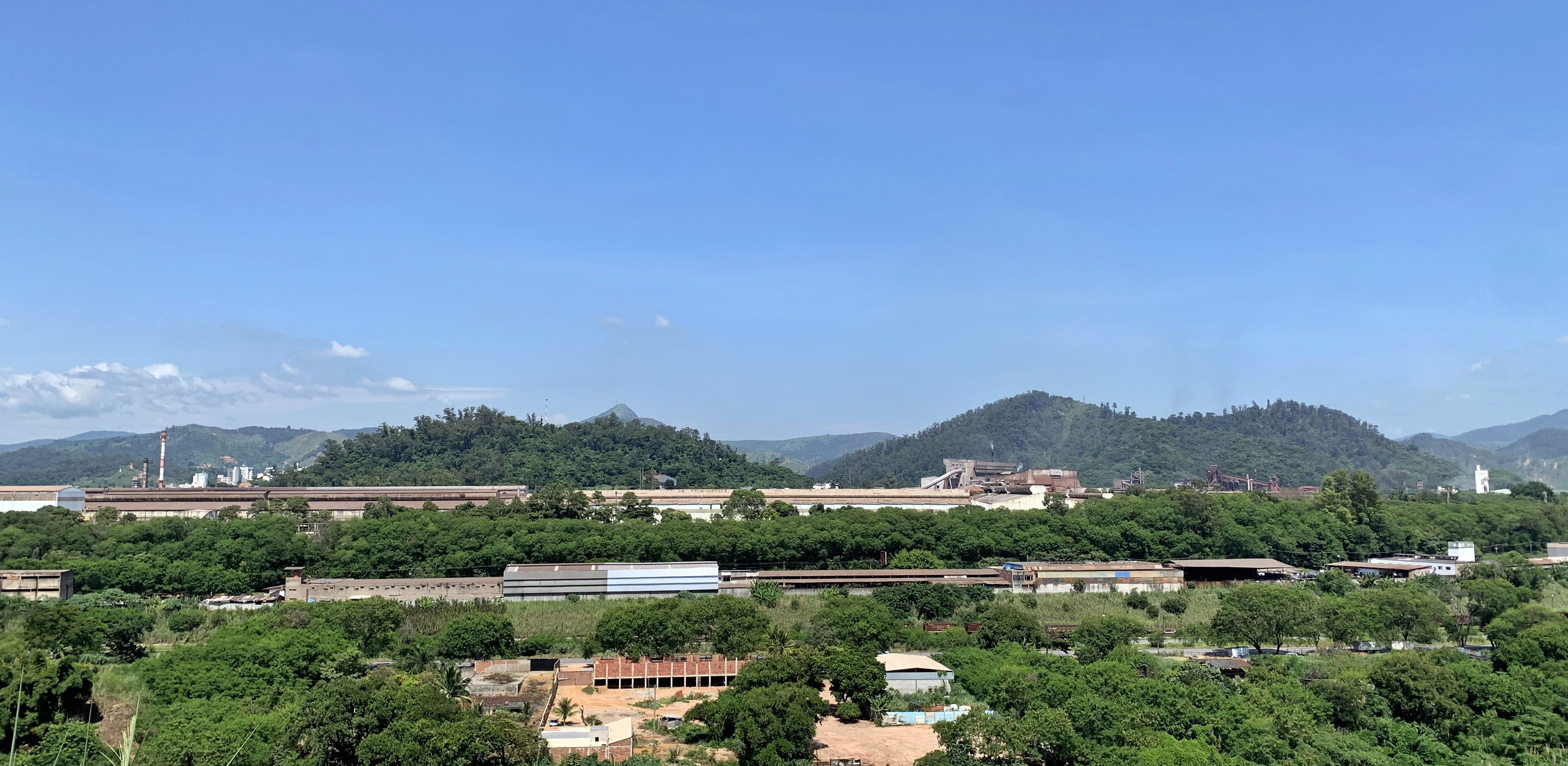
The Aperam South America plant as seen from Coronel Fabriciano.

The movement for Timóteo’s political autonomy began in 1947 but initially failed. It was revived in 1954 and later approved by the Coronel Fabriciano City Council and enacted by the Legislative Assembly of Minas Gerais (ALMG) through state law No. 2,764 of December 30, 1962, alongside Ipatinga’s emancipation. However, Governor José de Magalhães Pinto vetoed the emancipation of both districts under pressure from an alliance with Fabriciano’s then-mayor Cyro Cotta Poggiali. The Fabriciano municipal government was unwilling to forgo the revenue generated by Acesita and Usiminas, and the governor aimed to maintain political, administrative, economic, and financial unity in the steel hub.

A rift between the Fabriciano mayor and Magalhães Pinto prompted the governor to reconsider the veto, enabling a new commission to secure Timóteo’s emancipation approval by the state’s Interior Secretariat on April 28, 1964. This process also saw the emancipation of Ipatinga, João Monlevade, and Bela Vista de Minas. The independence of the districts was announced on a stage in Fabriciano’s Centro around noon on the same day, formalized in the Official Gazette the following day, April 29. Virico Fonseca was appointed intendant, but José Antônio de Araújo was the first elected mayor, taking office on December 3, 1965.

=== Urban development ===
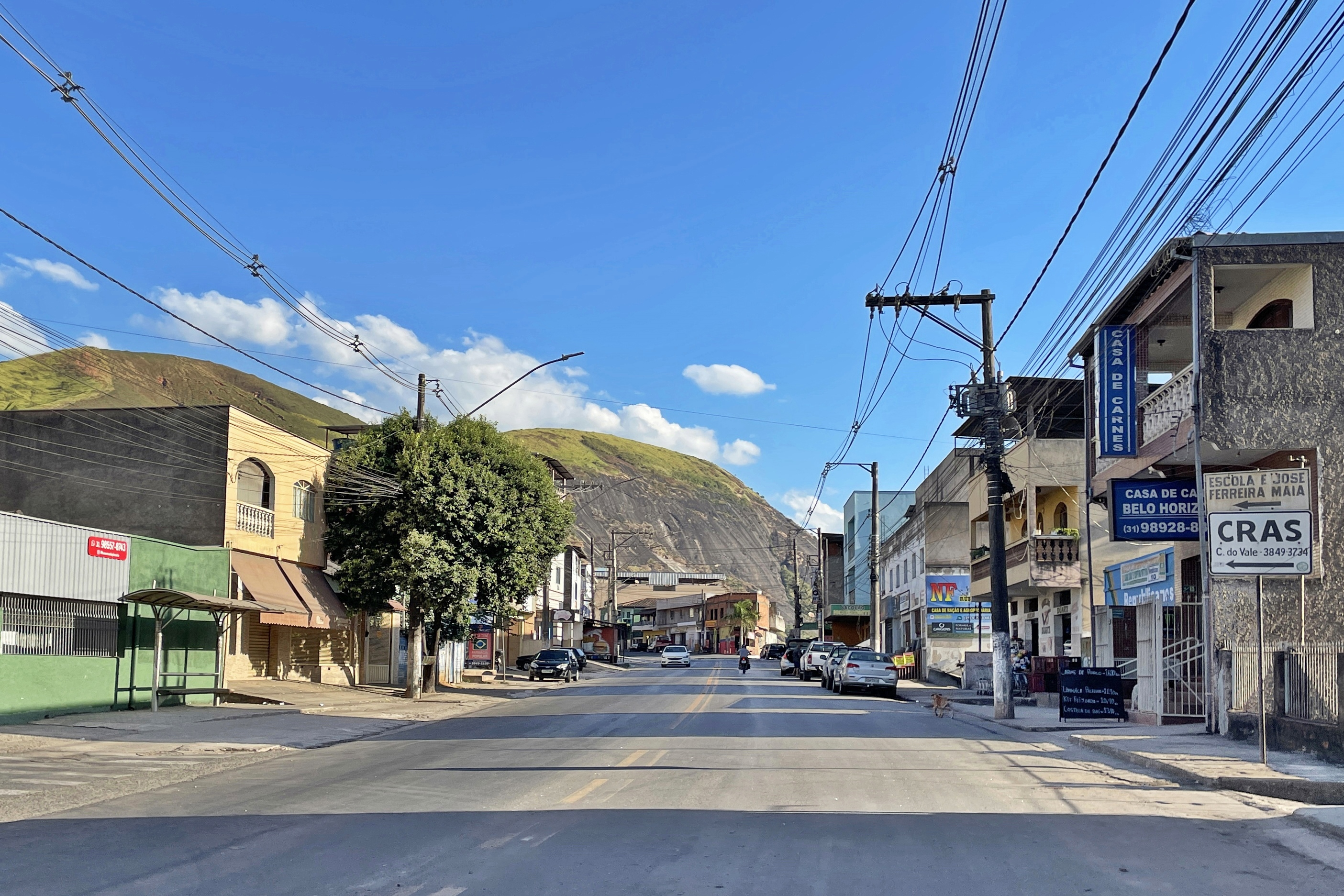
Belo Horizonte Avenue in the Cachoeira do Vale district, a former section of the BR-381 highway crossing the city.

Acesita’s responsibilities for public services were transferred to the municipal government in 1969. Until then, the urban core around the company consisted almost exclusively of its workers, as the infrastructure was initially built solely for them and their families. This situation divided the urban area into two clusters: one comprising company-built neighborhoods around Centro-Norte, still called "Acesita," and the other from the original São Sebastião do Alegre settlements in Centro-Sul, referred to as "Timóteo." As Centro-Sul received minimal investment from Acesita, it experienced relatively higher rates of poverty and deprivation. An attempt to integrate the two cores was the construction of the Primavera neighborhood in the 1970s through a partnership between the municipal government and the state, on land donated by Acesita.

Alongside the development of the original workers’ village, significant growth occurred in peripheral areas between the 1960s and 1970s, driven by non-industrial populations attracted by local progress, leading to relatively recent occupations in neighborhoods such as Ana Moura, Alvorada, Limoeiro, and Macuco, as well as the Cachoeira do Vale district along the BR-381 highway, established on May 13, 1976. This district, located in a lowland along the Piracicaba River, was severely impacted by flooding during the 1979 floods. That year marked the municipal administration’s first concerns about flood impacts, though the district continued to face recurrent flooding due to its location in the river’s floodplain.

Between 1979 and 1981, a plebiscite proposed renaming the municipality to "Acesita," which garnered 12,861 votes in favor and 4,908 votes against but was rejected by the Legislative Assembly of Minas Gerais (ALMG). However, the city’s population and economic growth stagnated in the 1980s due to a nationwide crisis. Of 55 companies planning to establish operations in Timóteo, only seven secured funding. Acesita’s accumulated debts led to its privatization, finalized on October 23, 1992. Subsequent cost-cutting measures, including staff and position reductions and workforce modernization, were implemented, which led to layoffs that strained the local economy's ability to absorb displaced workers, though dismissals were carried out gradually until 1994.

=== Recent history ===
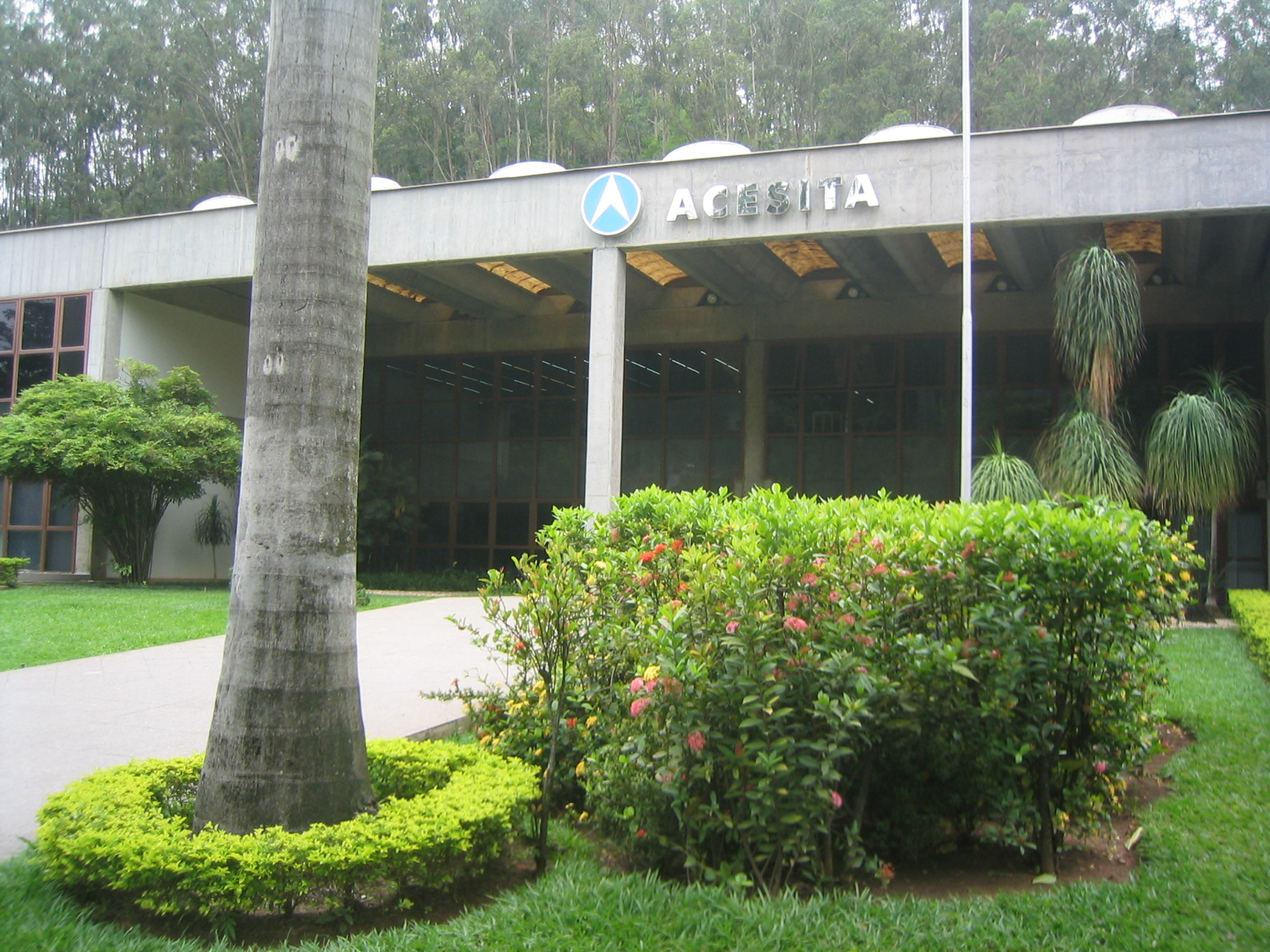
Acesita’s headquarters in 2003

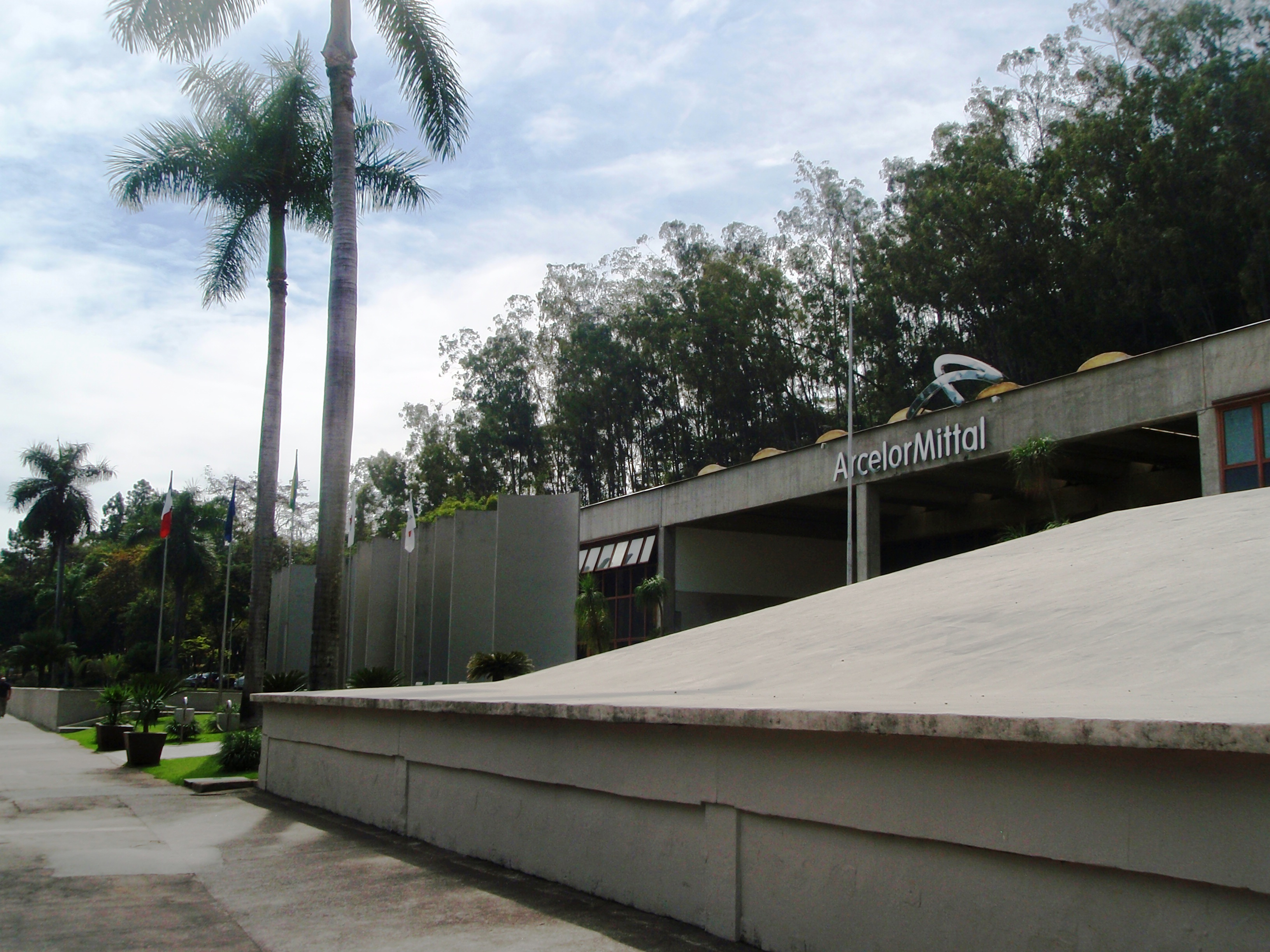
Company headquarters under the name ArcelorMittal Timóteo in 2010.

In the early 1990s, the creation of the first Municipal Master Plan to regulate urban planning and environmental issues, combined with Acesita’s privatization, reduced the public administration’s dependence on the company. Nonetheless, Acesita continued investing in arts and cultural facilities, notably through the Acesita Foundation (now Aperam Acesita Foundation), established in 1994. It also retained ownership of vast urban and rural lands in the municipality.

In the 2000s, Timóteo faced a political crisis marked by successive mayoral changes, starting with the impeachment of Geraldo Nascimento de Oliveira (PT) and his deputy on September 20, 2006. Leonardo Rodrigues Lelé da Cunha (PMDB), the runner-up in the 2004 election, was appointed in his place. Geraldo Nascimento returned via an injunction two months later but was impeached again in October 2007. Due to legal disputes, Leonardo could not take office, and his deputy Geraldo Hilário Torres (PSDB) was sworn in. Geraldo Nascimento secured another injunction in December 2007, but his final impeachment was upheld by the TSE in July 2008, when Geraldo Hilário Torres reassumed office. Torres was reelected in 2008 but was impeached in September 2010, with runner-up Sérgio Mendes Pires assuming office.

In 2007, the ArcelorMittal group acquired Acesita and renamed it ArcelorMittal Timóteo. In January 2011, it joined the Aperam group, becoming Aperam South America. Despite these changes, many residents still refer to the plant and the Centro-Norte area as "Acesita" due to its historical influence. This often confuses outsiders, who may think Timóteo and "Acesita" are separate cities, as the municipal administrative center is in Centro-Sul. The former company name persists in street names and commercial establishments.

== Geography ==
The municipality’s area is 144.381 square kilometres (55.746 sq mi), representing 0.0247% of Minas Gerais, 0.0157% of the Southeast Region, and 0.0017% of Brazil’s total territory. Of this, 18.13 square kilometres (7.00 sq mi) are urban. According to the regional division effective since 2017, established by the IBGE, Timóteo belongs to the Intermediate and Immediate Geographic Regions of Ipatinga. Previously, under the microregion and mesoregion divisions, it was part of the Ipatinga microregion within the Vale do Rio Doce mesoregion.

=== Topography and hydrography ===
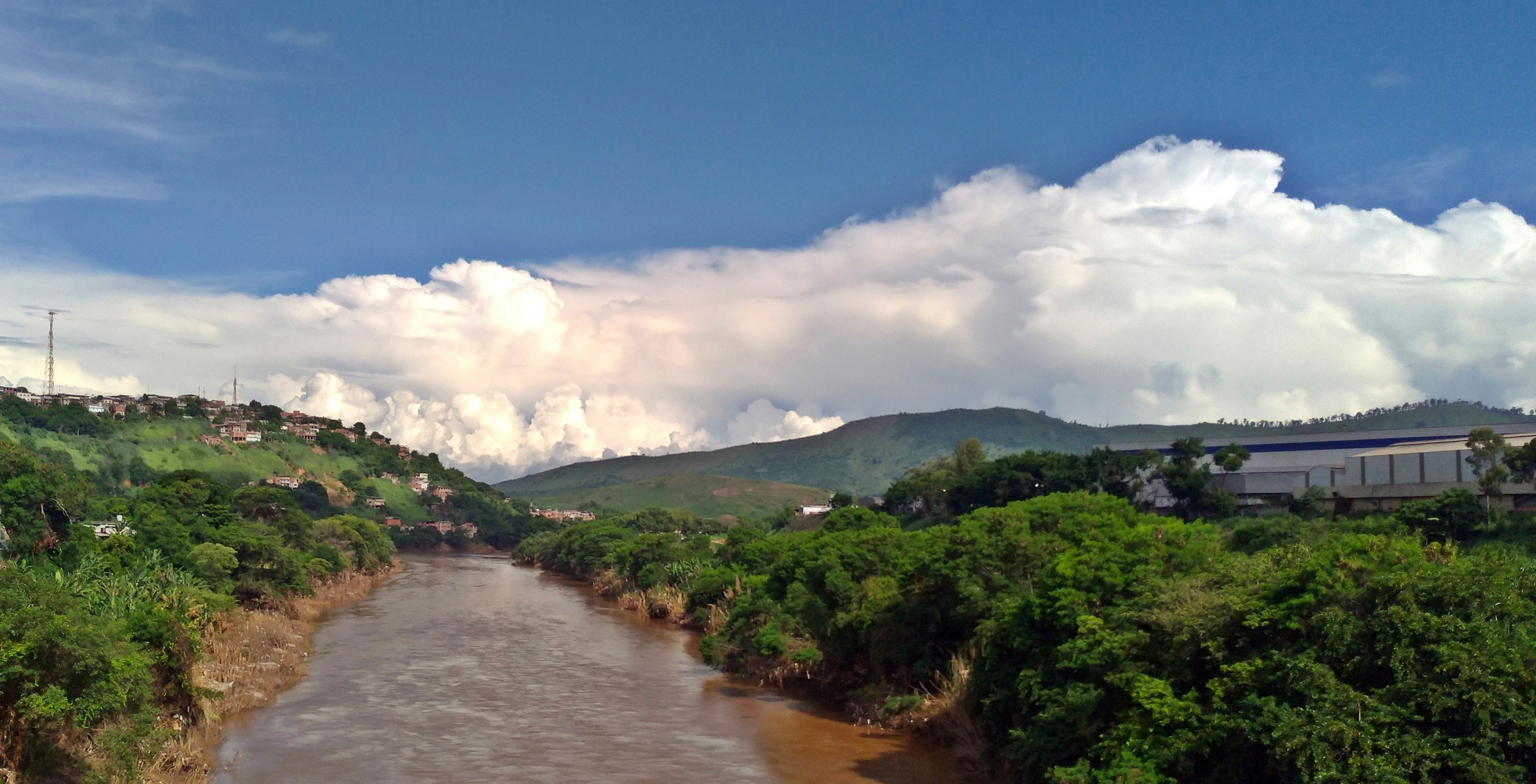
The Piracicaba River between Coronel Fabriciano and Timóteo, seen from the "old bridge." In the background to the right is the Serra do Timóteo.

Timóteo is located in the Vale do Rio Doce interplateau depression, where the terrain is the result of the fluvial erosion of Precambrian granite-gneiss rocks. The geological complex includes gneissic, magmatic, and metamorphic rocks, such as biotite-gneiss, granitic rocks, and granite-gneiss. The topography is diverse, with 50% of Timóteo's area comprising undulating hills, 30% being mountainous, and the final 20% being level.

The highest elevations are found in the west, reaching 864 meters at Ana Moura Peak. The lowest altitudes are found along riverbanks, with the lowest recorded being 225 meters at the mouth of the Piracicaba River in the Doce River. The municipal center is at 350 meters. The Piracicaba River’s location at the city’s northern boundary and the flat terrain nearby facilitated the establishment of the Vitória-Minas Railway and Acesita, and later the urban expansion of Timóteo, which was forced toward higher elevations. Consequently, significant occupation, especially by lower-income groups, has occurred in steeply sloped areas. The Rio Doce State Park region, in the east and south, features alternating hills and fluvial plains.

The Piracicaba River flows through the city, forming the boundary with Coronel Fabriciano, within its sub-basin, part of the Doce River Basin. The mouth of the Piracicaba River in the Doce River lies at the Rio Doce State Park’s boundary with Ipatinga. An alluvial aquifer beneath the Piracicaba’s mouth supplies most of the Vale do Aço’s water. The municipal territory includes five smaller sub-basins: the Atalho, Celeste, and Limoeiro streams, and the Belém (190 square kilometres (73 sq mi)) and Timotinho (39 square kilometres (15 sq mi)) rivers. The Timotinho River, the main watercourse crossing the city, suffers from severe pollution and unregulated occupation of its banks, contributing to flooding during the rainy season. Rio Doce State Park, which is crossed by the Doce River, has hundreds of small springs, and forms one of the world’s largest lacustrine systems.

=== Neighboring municipalities and metropolitan region ===
Timóteo borders Coronel Fabriciano and Ipatinga to the north, Caratinga and Bom Jesus do Galho to the east, Marliéria to the south, Antônio Dias to the west, and Jaguaraçu to the southwest. Rapid regional growth has blurred political boundaries, forming the Vale do Aço Metropolitan Region (RMVA), encompassing Timóteo, Coronel Fabriciano, Ipatinga, and Santana do Paraíso, as well as 24 other municipalities in the metropolitan area. As the seat of Aperam South America and other metal-mechanical and raw material supplier companies, Timóteo plays a key role as an employer for surrounding cities. The region gained international recognition due to major companies such as Aperam South America (Timóteo), Cenibra (Belo Oriente), and Usiminas (Ipatinga), all of which export large volumes of products. Despite its recent settlement, the region is one of the state’s main urban hubs.

=== Climate ===
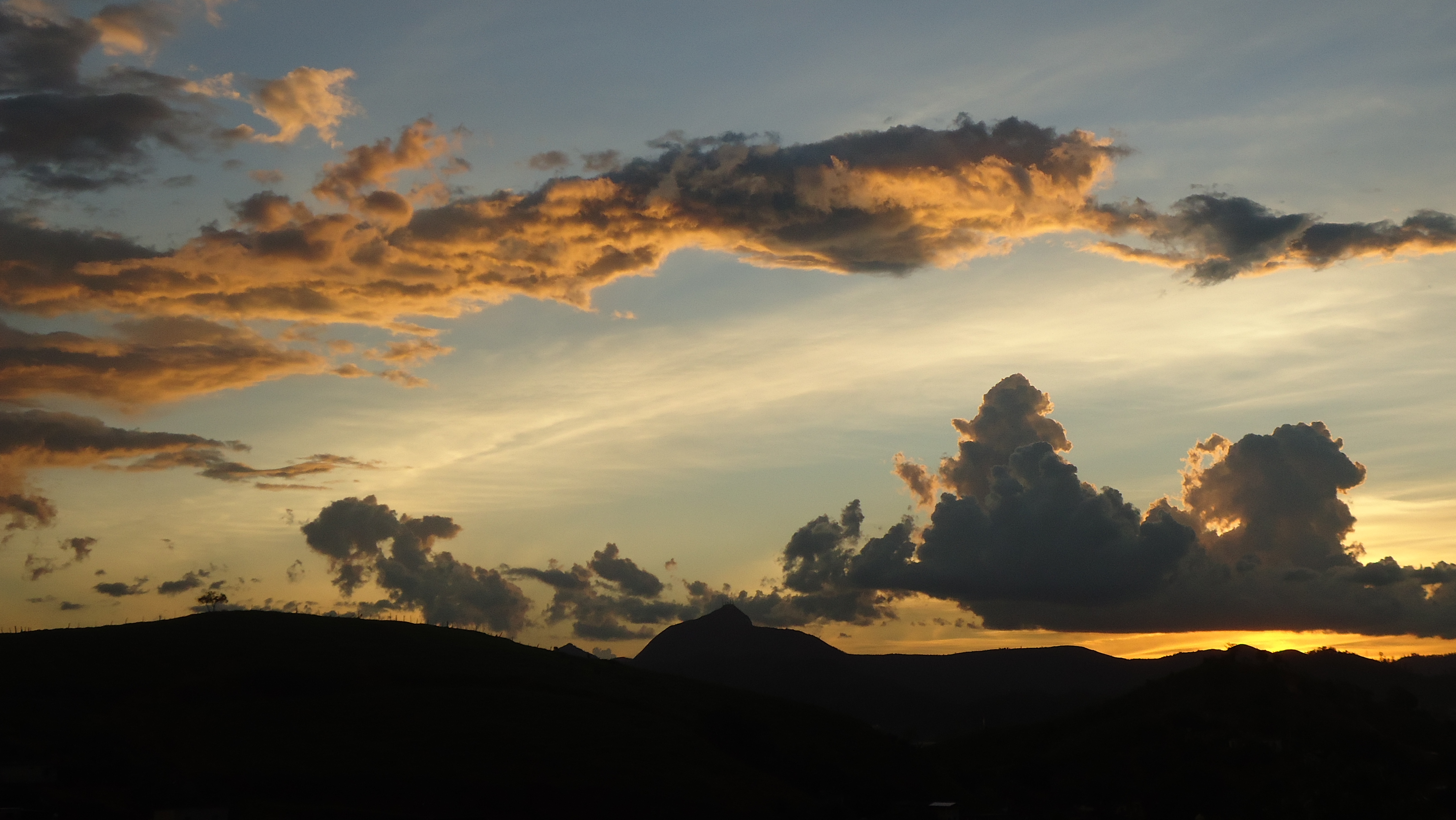
A view of the Ana Moura Peak in the distance at sunset on a spring afternoon.

Timóteo’s climate is classified as tropical wet and dry climate (type Aw, according to the Köppen system), with an average annual temperature of 23 °C (73 °F) and average precipitation of 1,430 millimetres (56 in)/year, concentrated between October and April. The rainy season includes the warmer months, while the dry season covers milder months. Autumn and spring are transitional seasons. The transition between dry and wet seasons features thunderstorms and high thermal amplitude, especially from late winter to spring.

Precipitation primarily occurs as rain and, occasionally, hail, recorded on August 28, 2014, damaging hundreds of homes and businesses, and more recently on May 1, 2023, and April 28, 2025. Rains may be accompanied by lightning and strong wind gusts. According to the Atmospheric Electricity Group of the National Institute for Space Research (ELAT/INPE) in 2018, the municipality had a lightning strike density of 3.019 strikes per km^{2}/year, which puts it in 270th place in the state and 3,173rd place nationally.

Largest 24-hour precipitation accumulations recorded in Timóteo (CPRM and ANA) by month (1974–2024)
Month	Accumulation	Date	Month	Accumulation	Date
January	122.1 millimetres (4.81 in)	January 25, 2020	July	19.4 millimetres (0.76 in)	July 26, 2023
February	170.8 millimetres (6.72 in)	February 12, 1998	August	42.8 millimetres (1.69 in)	August 21, 2023
March	128 millimetres (5.0 in)	March 23, 2024	September	84.2 millimetres (3.31 in)	September 23, 2006
April	96.4 millimetres (3.80 in)	April 14, 1980	October	118 millimetres (4.6 in)	October 24, 2003
May	42 millimetres (1.7 in)	May 3, 1990	November	186.2 millimetres (7.33 in)	November 14, 1981
June	58.3 millimetres (2.30 in)	June 28, 1975	December	200.2 millimetres (7.88 in)	December 15, 2005

Fog occurs with high humidity and low temperatures. However, low humidity levels can occur during the dry season or prolonged Indian summers. During these periods, dry air and pollution increase atmospheric pollutant concentration, degrading air quality. The prevailing wind comes from the east, with the windiest period from August 2 to December 6, averaging 10.6 kilometers per hour, peaking slightly in September and October. During the calmer period from March to June, wind speeds average 8 to 9 kilometers per hour.

According to data from the National Institute of Meteorology (INMET) collected at the automatic weather station located in the Primavera neighborhood, installed on February 22, 2006, the lowest recorded temperature was 9.1 °C (48.4 °F) on May 20, 2022, and the highest reached 38.5 °C (101.3 °F) on September 28, 2020. The lowest relative humidity index was 12% on September 28, 2020. The highest 24-hour precipitation accumulation was 149.2 millimetres (5.87 in) on March 23, 2024. The highest hourly precipitation was 77.4 millimetres (3.05 in) between 2 p.m. and 3 p.m. on December 11, 2017, while the strongest wind gust was 66.24 kilometres per hour (41.16 mph), recorded during a storm on the night of March 6, 2006. According to measurements by the Brazilian Geological Service (CPRM) and the National Water and Sanitation Agency (ANA), which began in 1974, the highest 24-hour rainfall volume was 200.2 millimetres (7.88 in) on December 15, 2005. Other significant accumulations (completing the top five) were 186.2 millimetres (7.33 in) on November 14, 1981, 170.8 millimetres (6.72 in) on February 12, 1998, 139.2 millimetres (5.48 in) on November 11, 2021, and 130.2 millimetres (5.13 in) on February 1, 1979.

Climate data for Timóteo
Month	Jan	Feb	Mar	Apr	May	Jun	Jul	Aug	Sep	Oct	Nov	Dec	Year
Record high °C (°F)	37.6 (99.7)	36.5 (97.7)	34.4 (93.9)	33.6 (92.5)	31.9 (89.4)	33.0 (91.4)	33.3 (91.9)	34.2 (93.6)	38.5 (101.3)	38.0 (100.4)	38.3 (100.9)	35.5 (95.9)	38.5 (101.3)
Mean daily maximum °C (°F)	32.3 (90.1)	33.0 (91.4)	32.3 (90.1)	31.0 (87.8)	29.0 (84.2)	27.9 (82.2)	28.1 (82.6)	28.6 (83.5)	29.6 (85.3)	30.1 (86.2)	30.9 (87.6)	31.2 (88.2)	30.3 (86.5)
Daily mean °C (°F)	25.3 (77.5)	25.5 (77.9)	25.0 (77.0)	23.5 (74.3)	21.4 (70.5)	19.5 (67.1)	19.1 (66.4)	19.9 (67.8)	22.0 (71.6)	23.3 (73.9)	24.2 (75.6)	24.7 (76.5)	22.8 (73.0)
Mean daily minimum °C (°F)	20.6 (69.1)	20.5 (68.9)	20.1 (68.2)	18.5 (65.3)	16.2 (61.2)	14.1 (57.4)	13.1 (55.6)	13.9 (57.0)	16.4 (61.5)	18.6 (65.5)	19.4 (66.9)	20.2 (68.4)	17.6 (63.7)
Record low °C (°F)	17.8 (64.0)	17.8 (64.0)	17.0 (62.6)	12.5 (54.5)	9.1 (48.4)	10.0 (50.0)	9.6 (49.3)	10.1 (50.2)	12.4 (54.3)	12.6 (54.7)	13.3 (55.9)	15.9 (60.6)	9.1 (48.4)
Average precipitation mm (inches)	240.7 (9.48)	138.7 (5.46)	165.3 (6.51)	67.1 (2.64)	41.0 (1.61)	15.3 (0.60)	7.5 (0.30)	18.0 (0.71)	48.7 (1.92)	108.9 (4.29)	261.2 (10.28)	316.0 (12.44)	1,428.4 (56.24)
Source 1: Somar Meteorologia — average temperatures and precipitation;
Source 2: National Institute of Meteorology (INMET) — records from 24 February 2006 to 31 December 2024

=== Ecology and environment ===
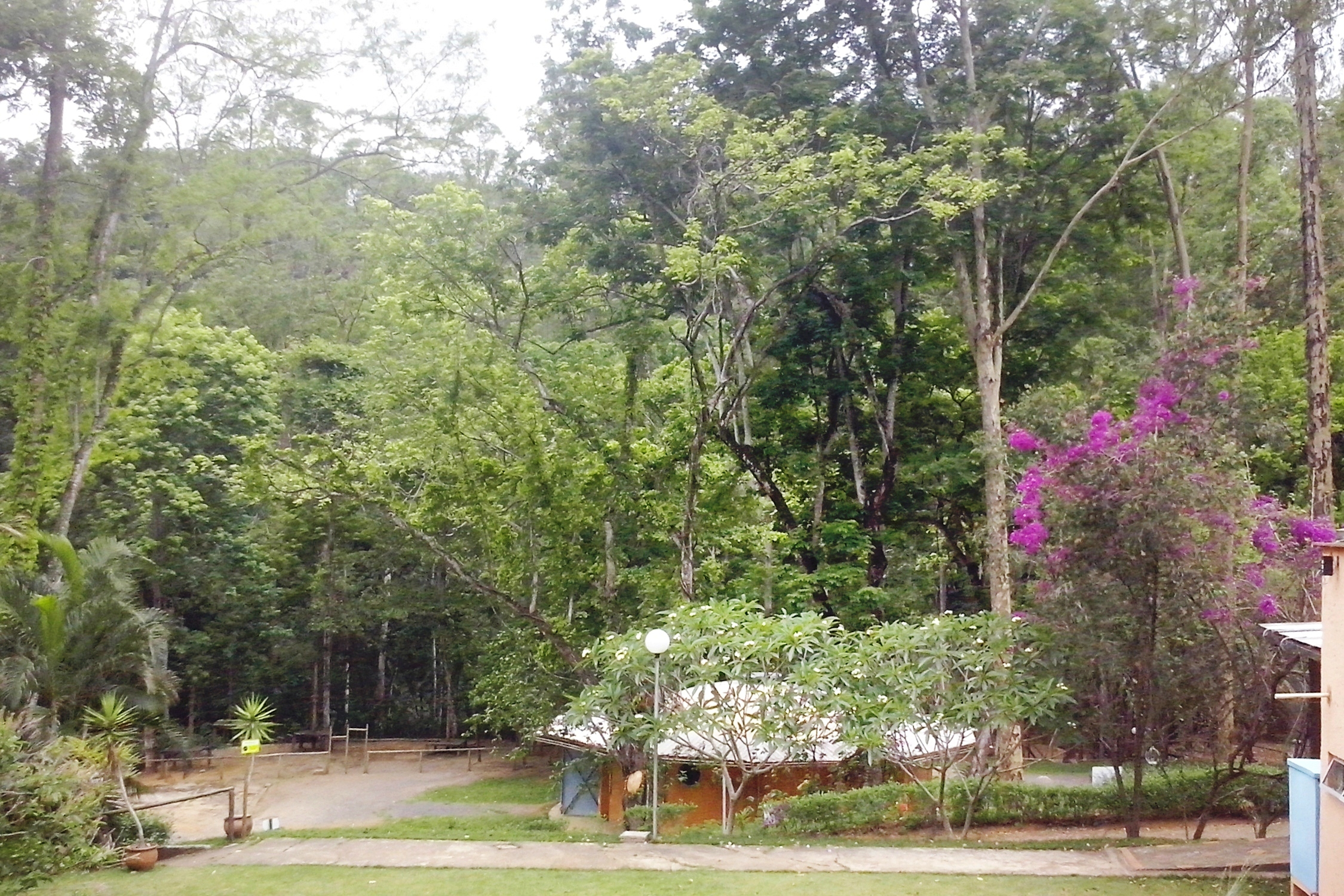
Tree cover within Oikós, a preservation area integrated with the Rio Doce State Park maintained by Aperam South America.

The native vegetation belongs to the Atlantic Forest domain, with the original biome covering 116.17 square kilometres (44.85 sq mi), equivalent to 80.46% of the municipality's area. Notably, 53.2 square kilometres (20.5 sq mi) of the municipal area is protected by the Rio Doce State Park (PERD), established in 1944 to safeguard the remaining native forest against deforestation driven by local industrial complexes. In addition to encompassing one of the world's largest lake systems, this conservation unit represents the largest Atlantic Forest reserve in Minas Gerais, extending into the municipalities of Dionísio and Marliéria. The biodiversity is remarkable, providing a habitat for 325 bird species and 77 mammal species, including endangered species such as the jaguar, solitary tinamou, and southern muriqui.

Furthermore, Timóteo has an environmental protection area (APA), which, together with preservation areas in neighboring municipalities, forms an ecological corridor connecting other regions of the Steel Valley to the PERD. The APA Serra do Timóteo serves as a buffer zone for the PERD and was recognized in 2003. However, it has faced irregular and invasive occupations due to urban expansion in the Alphaville, Macuco, and Recanto Verde neighborhoods. The Oikós Project, located within the urban area, is a revegetation initiative by Aperam South America integrated with the Serra do Timóteo and the Rio Doce State Park. It serves local schools and the community through visits, lectures, ecological activities, and programs organized by the Aperam Acesita Foundation, featuring trails and recreational areas dedicated to children. The presence of the Rio Doce State Park contributes to Timóteo having approximately 1,000 square meters of green space per inhabitant, one of the highest rates in Brazil. Focused on environmental conservation, the city also promotes ecological awareness campaigns involving the population and urban tree planting programs. The municipality has an Integrated Urban Tree Planting Plan, aimed at planning and managing tree species to ensure proper interaction with the population and the environment.

==== Environmental issues ====
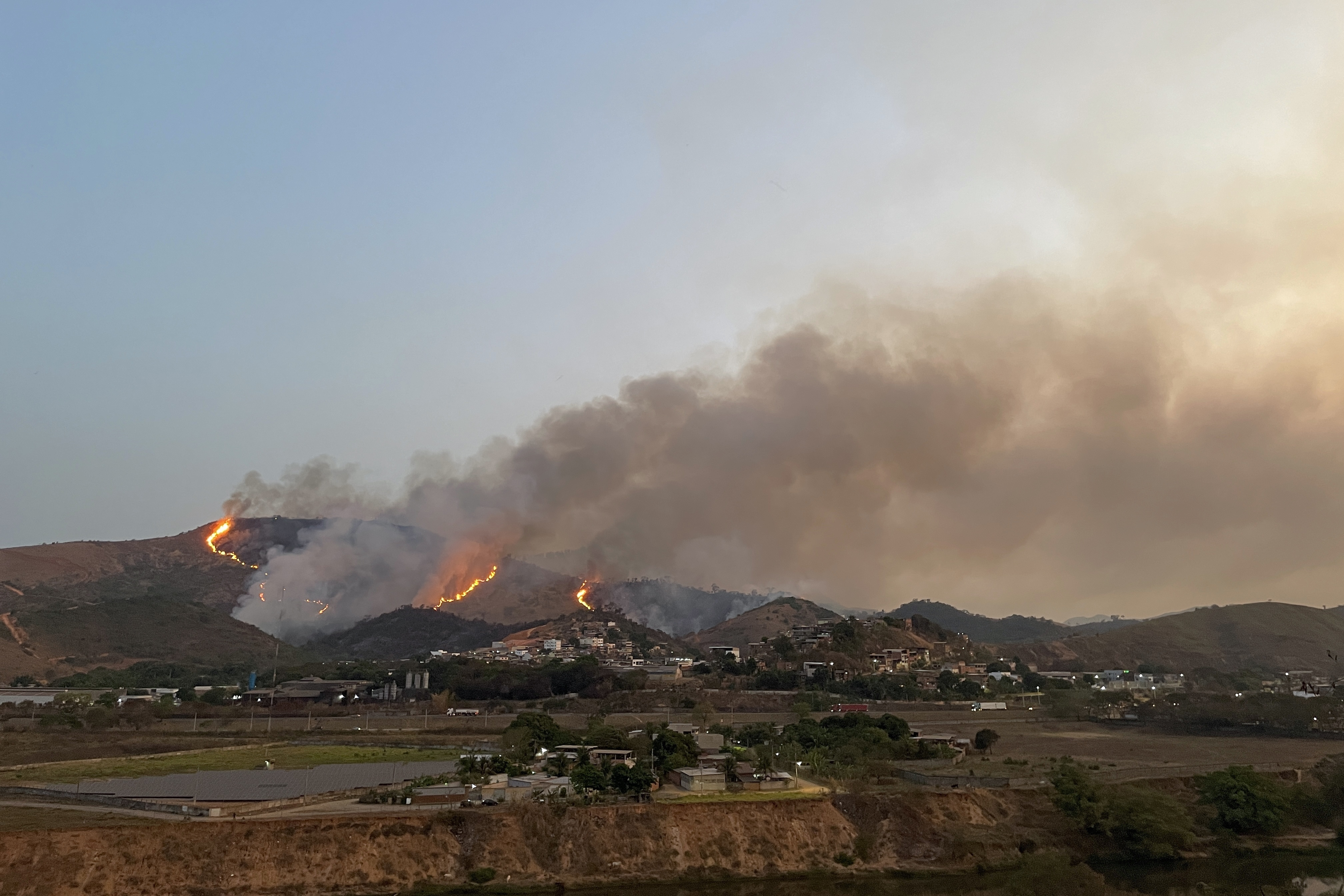
Fire affecting the Serra do Timóteo in September 2024

Some of the main environmental challenges in the city include floods, which during the rainy season cause significant damage in the lower and more populated areas along the Piracicaba River, particularly in the Cachoeira do Vale district and neighborhoods along smaller waterways, as well as landslides on hills and slopes. These issues are often caused by residential construction in irregular zones, in addition to waste and sewage discharged into streams and rivers. The city hall and agencies such as the Brazilian Geological Service (CPRM) maintain rainfall stations and monitoring points for the Piracicaba River's water levels in Timóteo and other municipalities in the river basin, and in case of alerts, residents of riverside areas are evacuated. A mapping of risk areas in the municipality also serves as a basis for other preventive measures.

On the other hand, during the dry season and prolonged Indian summers within the rainy season, wildfires are common in hills and wooded areas, including the PERD. Between September 20 and 24, 2019, a fire consumed 484.2 hectares (1,196 acres) of the reserve between Timóteo and Marliéria, the largest in recent years, and was controlled with the aid of rainfall. Forest fires contribute to the destruction of native forest, degrade soil quality, and further impair air quality, which is already affected by pollutants from the Steel Valley's industrial plants. Visual pollution, meanwhile, is significant in various parts of the urban area, with considerable presence of uncontrolled posters and advertisements on walls, poles, and other open spaces.

== Demographics ==
Historical population
Year	Pop.	±%
1970	32,760	—
1980	50,601	+54.5%
1991	58,298	+15.2%
2000	71,478	+22.6%
2010	81,243	+13.7%
2022	81,579	+0.4%
Source: Brazilian Institute of Geography and Statistics (IBGE)

In 2022, the population was estimated at 81,579 inhabitants by the census conducted that year by the Brazilian Institute of Geography and Statistics (IBGE). Of the total, 38,811 were men (47.58%) and 42,768 were women (52.43%). According to the same census, 81,448 inhabitants lived in the urban area (99.84%) and 131 in the rural area (0.16%). There were 74,168 inhabitants in the main district (90.92% of the municipal population), while the Cachoeira do Vale district had 7,411 residents (9.08%).

Of the total population in 2022, 14,456 inhabitants (17.72%) were under 15 years old, 10,848 (13.3%) were aged 15 to 24, 17,730 (21.74%) were aged 25 to 39, 28,436 (34.85%) were aged 40 to 64, and 10,109 (12.39%) were 65 or older. In 2010, the life expectancy at birth was 75.1 years, and the total fertility rate per woman was 1.5.

=== Indicators and inequality ===
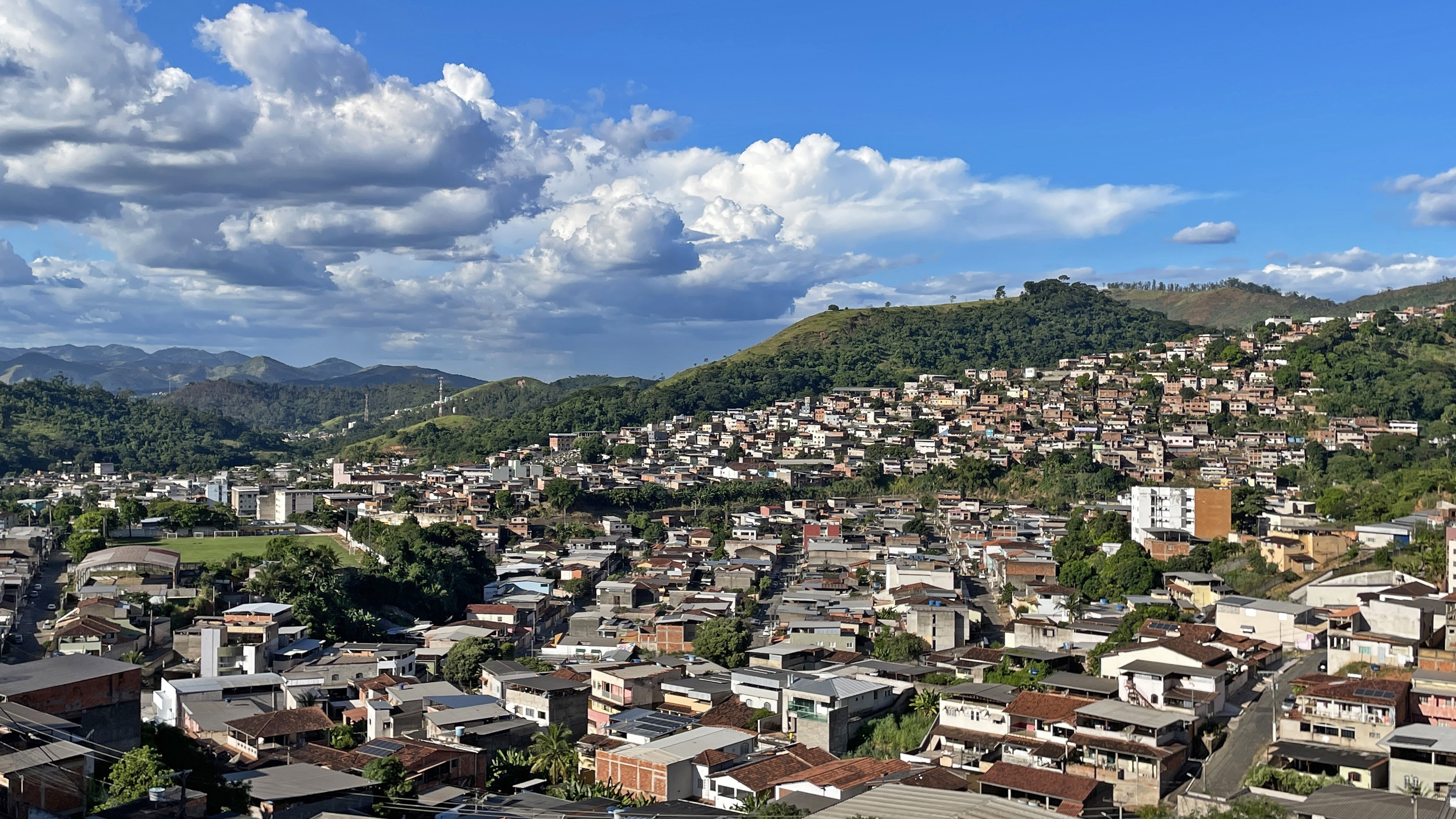
Ana Rita neighborhood (foreground) with Centro-Sul in the background on the left and a slum in Bela Vista on the right

The Municipal Human Development Index (HDI-M) of Timóteo is considered high by the United Nations Development Programme (UNDP), with a value of 0.771 (the 227th highest in Brazil and the 17th highest in Minas Gerais). The city has most indicators close to the national average according to the UNDP. Specifically, the education index is 0.742, the longevity index is 0.836, and the income index is 0.737.

From 2000 to 2010, the proportion of people with a per capita household income of up to half a minimum wage decreased by 64.6%, and in 2010, 94.3% of the population lived above the poverty line, 4.5% were at the poverty line, and 1.2% were below it. The Gini coefficient, which measures social inequality, was 0.489, where 1.00 is the worst and 0.00 is the best. The share of the city's total income held by the richest 20% of the population was 53.5%, or 12 times higher than that of the poorest 20%, which was 4.5%. In 2013, according to the city hall, there was a housing deficit of approximately 4,500 units.

In 2022, according to the IBGE census, 11.83% of the population lived in slums and urban communities, representing the ninth-largest proportion of residents in such conditions among Minas Gerais municipalities. That year, the institute identified six slums and urban communities in Timóteo, housing 9,648 people. Despite the construction of planned housing complexes to accommodate the industrial population during Acesita's establishment, the presence of slums results from uncontrolled land occupation by people attracted to local economic progress. To address this, housing projects, land regularization, and lot acquisition programs are strategies aimed at improving the management of related policies.

=== Ethnicity and religion ===
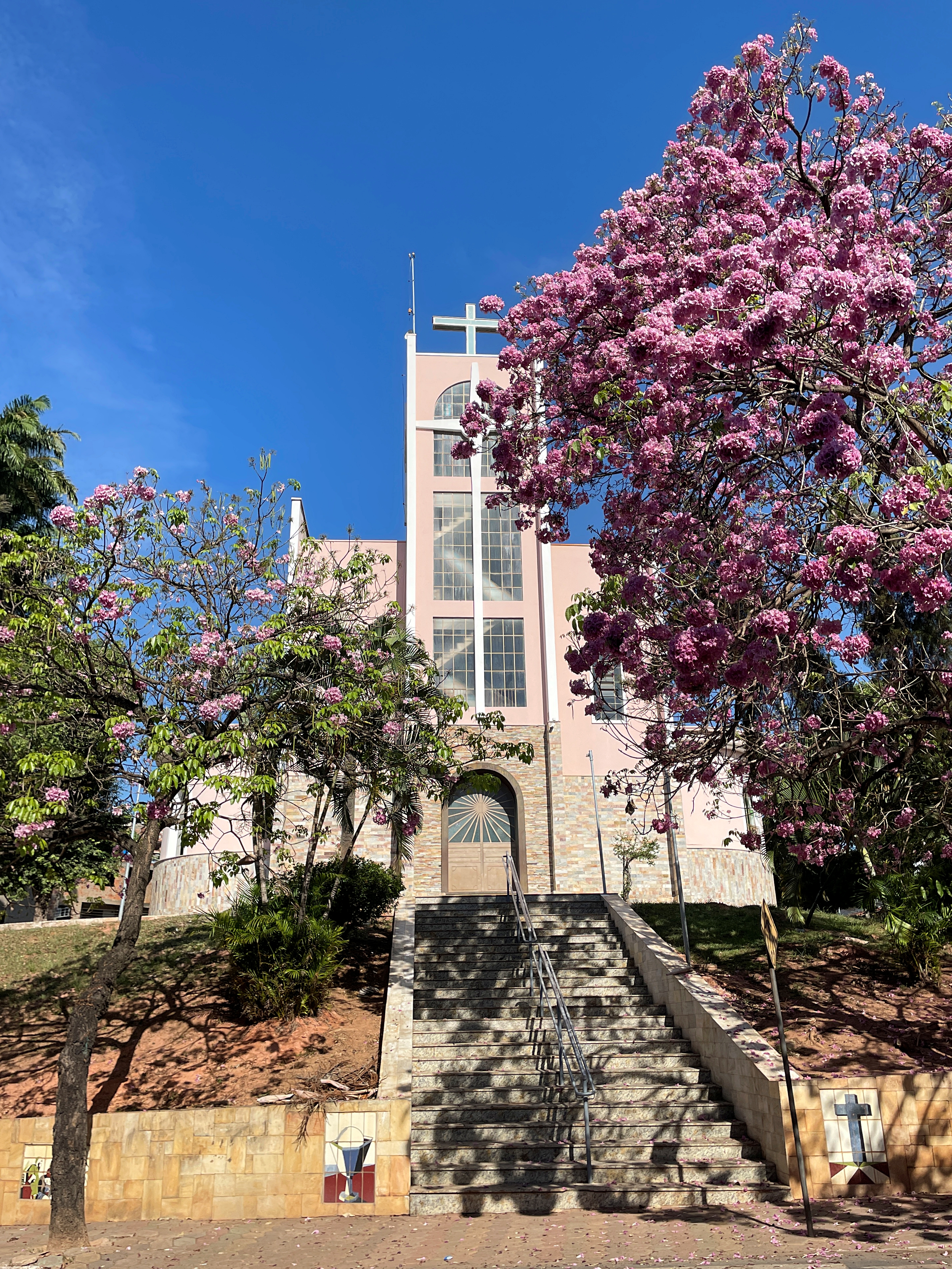
The São Sebastião Parish Church, part of the São Sebastião Parish, in Centro-Sul.

In 2022, the population consisted of 40,893 mixed-race (50.13%), 28,095 white (34.44%), 12,393 black (15.19%), 121 Asian (0.15%), and 72 Indigenous (0.09%) individuals. In 2010, considering the region of birth, 79,914 were born in the Southeast (98.36%), 59 in the North (0.07%), 809 in the Northeast (1.00%), 111 in the Central-West (0.14%), and 71 in the South (0.09%). 78,092 inhabitants were born in Minas Gerais (96.12%), of which 48,332 were born in Timóteo (59.49%). Among the 3,151 residents born in other states, Espírito Santo had the largest presence with 837 people (1.03%), followed by São Paulo with 563 residents (0.69%), and Bahia with 427 residents (0.53%).

According to the 2022 IBGE census, the municipal population aged 10 and over comprised 30,896 evangelicals (42.95%), 30,791 Catholics (42.8%), 5,501 people with no religion (7.65%), 540 Spiritists (0.75%), with the remaining 5.85% distributed among other religions. The municipality is part of Pastoral Region III of the Diocese of Itabira-Fabriciano and is divided into four parishes: São Francisco de Assis, São João Batista, São José, and São Sebastião. Their origins trace back to the Catholic faith inherited from the first settlers, maintained by the workers who came to build Acesita.

The São José Parish, located near the former workers' village and established in the 1950s, offered literacy, sewing, and painting courses to early residents. The São Sebastião Parish, corresponding to the oldest urban core, was established in the 1960s. Meanwhile, the São João Batista Parish, based in the Cachoeira do Vale district, was created in 2017. The growth of Protestant religions has been significant since the 1990s, making Timóteo one of the largest evangelical communities in the state, surpassing the number of Catholics in the 2022 census.

== Politics and subdivisions ==
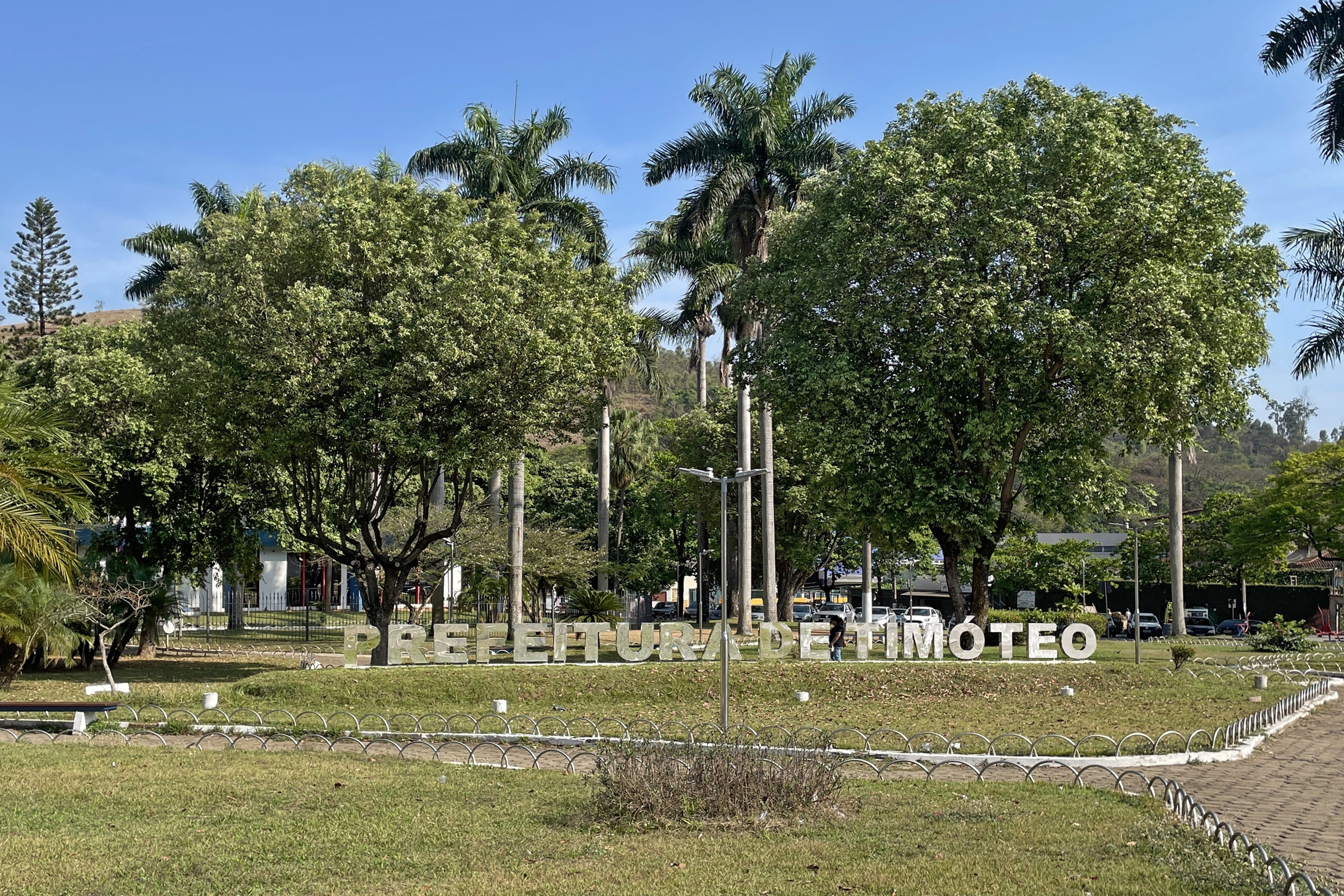
Municipal Palace in the São José neighborhood, housing the City Hall and City Council.

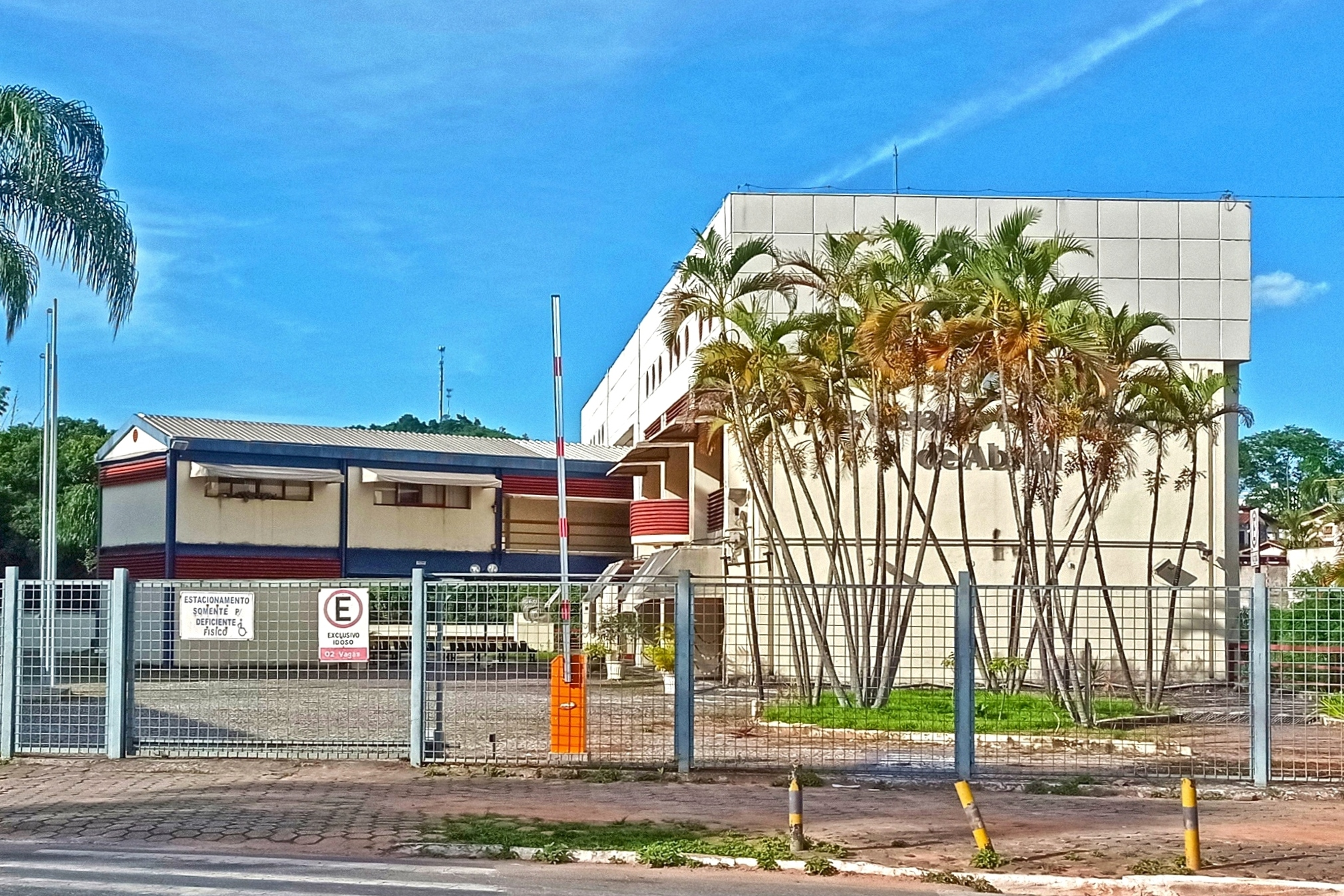
View of the Doutor Geraldo Perlingeiro de Abreu Courthouse, part of the Timóteo judicial district.

Municipal administration is carried out by the Executive and Legislative branches. The Executive is led by the mayor, supported by their cabinet of secretaries. The first Executive representative was Virico Fonseca, appointed intendant by Governor José de Magalhães Pinto after political emancipation, while José Antônio de Araújo was the first elected mayor, taking office on December 3, 1965. The mayor elected in the 2024 municipal elections was Vitor Vicente do Prado (Captain Vitor), elected by the Republicans with 33.81% of valid votes, alongside Marcelo Araújo Martins (PMB) as vice-mayor.

The Legislative branch consists of the municipal chamber, composed of fifteen councilors. It is responsible for drafting and voting on fundamental laws for the administration and the Executive, particularly the participatory budget (budget guidelines law). Complementing the legislative process and the work of the secretaries, several municipal councils are active, including those for children's and adolescents' rights (created in 2010), guardianship (2010), racial equality (2006), elderly rights (2010), rights of people with disabilities (2009), and women's policies (2007). Timóteo is governed by its organic law, enacted on April 29, 1990, and hosts a judicial district of the state judiciary, of special category, operating in the Doutor Geraldo Perlingeiro Courthouse, with jurisdiction over the municipalities of Jaguaraçu and Marliéria. As of September 2024, the municipality had 60,562 voters, according to the Superior Electoral Court (TSE).

The municipality consists of the main district and the Cachoeira do Vale district, located west of the municipal territory. The total area of the main district is 133 square kilometres (51 sq mi), while Cachoeira do Vale covers 10.99 square kilometres (4.24 sq mi). According to the IBGE in 2022, the city had 39 official neighborhoods, with the most populous being Cachoeira do Vale—the seat of the homonymous district—(6,515 inhabitants), Ana Rita (4,732 inhabitants), and Primavera (4,681 inhabitants). The neighborhoods are organized into seven "regions" by the city hall for administrative purposes, named according to their geographic location. The availability of areas for urban expansion in Timóteo is relatively limited due to its topography and restrictions related to the proximity of the Rio Doce State Park. This is reflected in the high population density and the slowdown in population growth since the 1990s.

== Economy ==
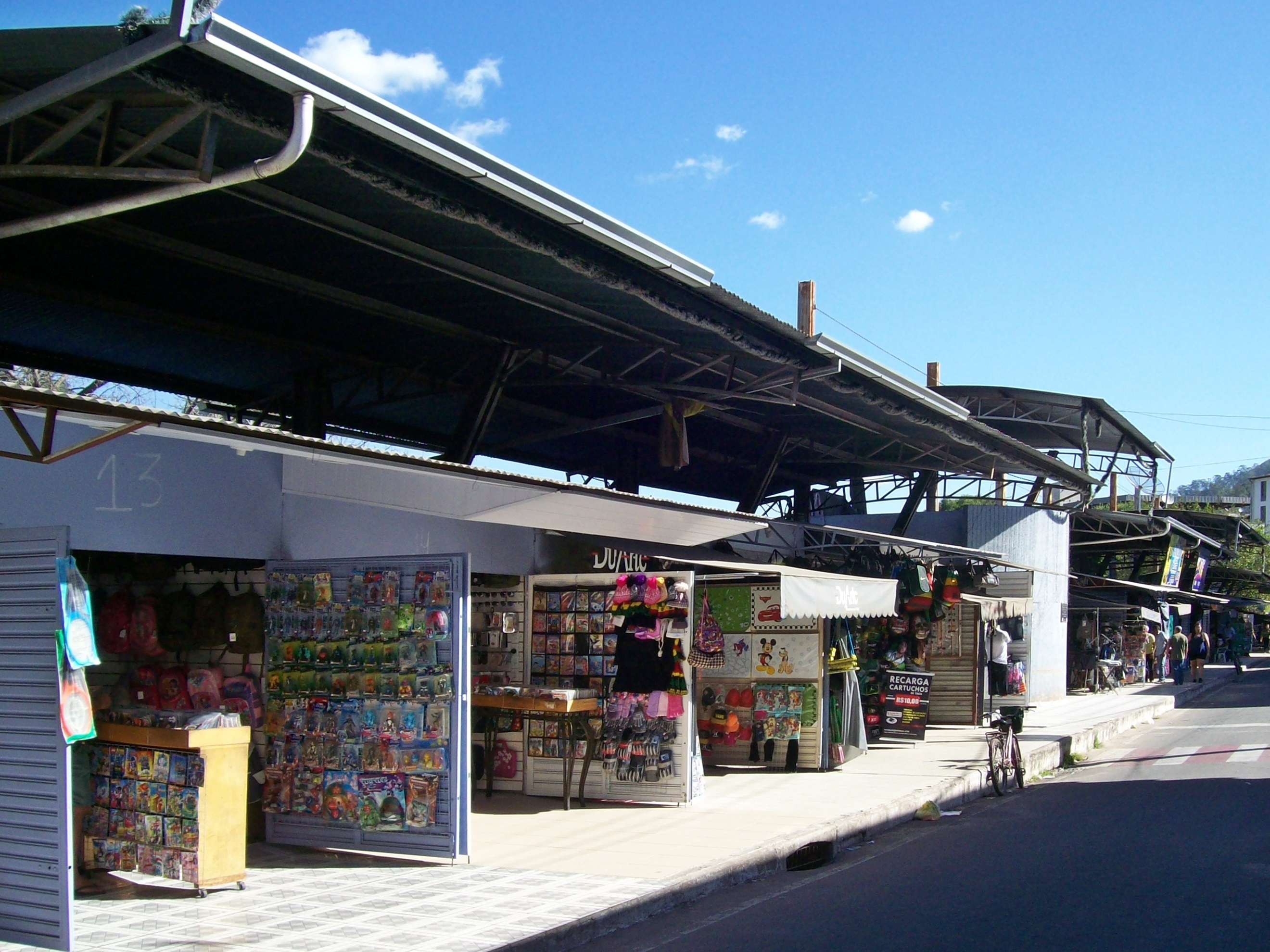
Raimundo de Souza Neto Informal Economy Center, a street market in Centro-Norte.

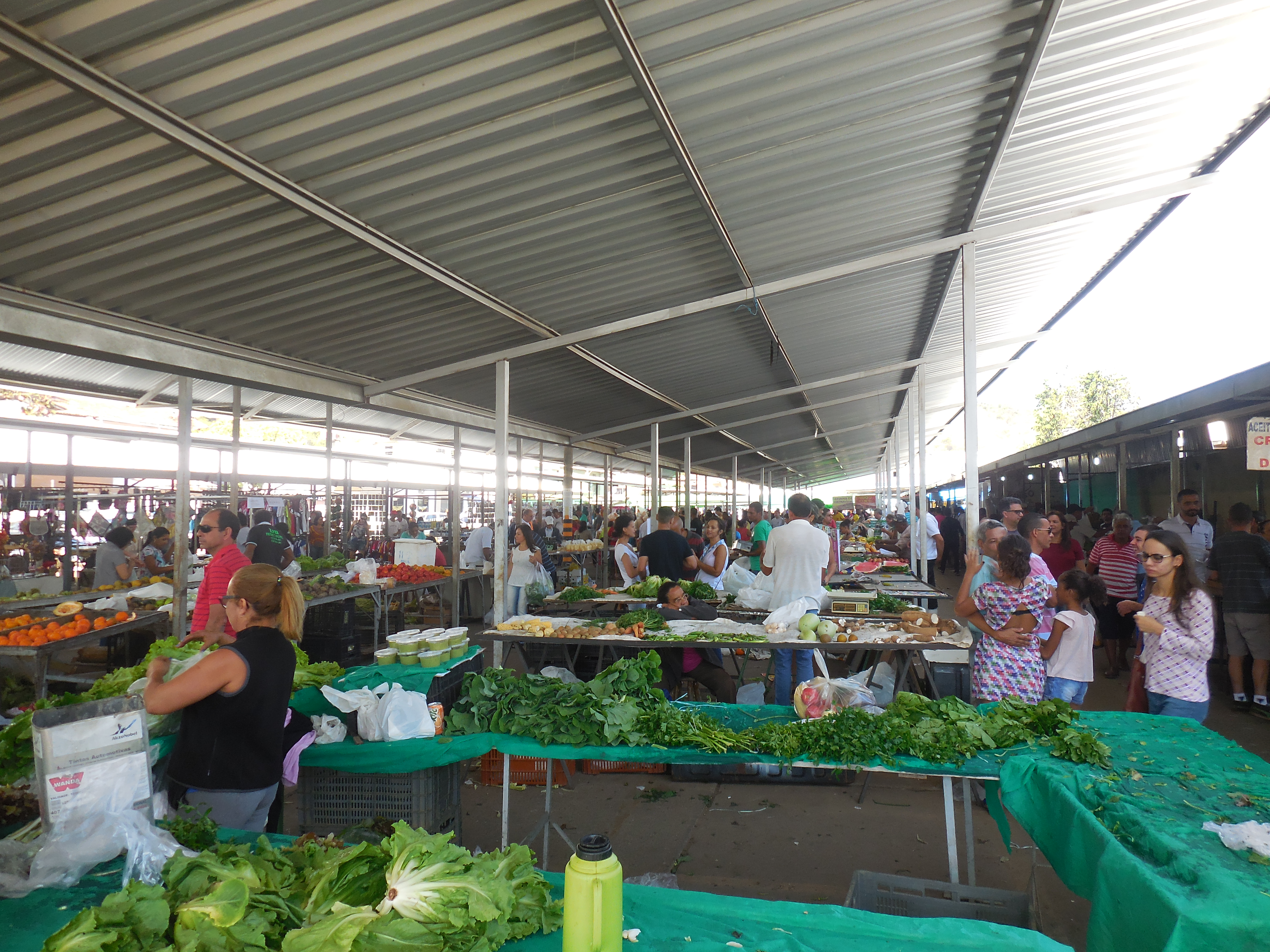
Interior of the Timirim Fair, held in the João XXIII neighborhood.

In Timóteo's Gross Domestic Product (GDP), the industry and service sector stand out. According to 2021 IBGE data, the municipality's GDP at current prices was R$5,611,338.76 thousand. 728,712.20 thousand were from taxes on products net of subsidies at current prices, and the per capita GDP was R$61,482.00. In 2010, 64.9% of the population over 18 was economically active, with an unemployment rate of 11.55%. Notably, about 16.8% of the population commuted to another municipality for work, given the location and easy access to industrial complexes in other municipalities of the Steel Valley Metropolitan Region.

In 2022, wages and other remunerations totaled 781,699 thousand reais, with an average monthly salary of 2.7 minimum wages. There were 3,656 local units and 3,533 active companies. According to the IBGE, in 2010, 51.01% of households had a monthly per capita income of less than one minimum wage (12,509 households), 37.05% had between one and three minimum wages per person (9,134 households), 5.54% had between three and five minimum wages (1,359 households), 3.63% had over five minimum wages (890 households), and 2.56% had no income (628 households).

=== Agriculture ===
In 2021, livestock and agriculture contributed 1,663.03 thousand reais to Timóteo's economy, while in 2010, 1.75% of the economically active population was employed in this sector. According to the IBGE, in 2023, the municipality had a herd of 1,370 poultry, 1,031 cattle, 152 horses, 73 pigs, and 31 sheep. In the same year, the city produced 777 thousand liters of milk from 215 cows, 7,000 dozen eggs from 550 hens, and 103,500 kilograms of honey. In 2019, Timóteo and neighboring Ipatinga were the two Minas Gerais municipalities exporting the most honey internationally, according to the state government.

In permanent agriculture, in 2023, the crops with the largest planted areas were bananas (9 hectares) and coconuts (1 hectare). Family farming is prominent in Timóteo, particularly through the cultivation of vegetables, honey production, and biscuit manufacturing. Part of the local agricultural production is sold at local markets. The Timirim Fair, held in the João XXIII neighborhood, is one of the main regular open-air markets in the Steel Valley Metropolitan Region.

=== Industry and services ===
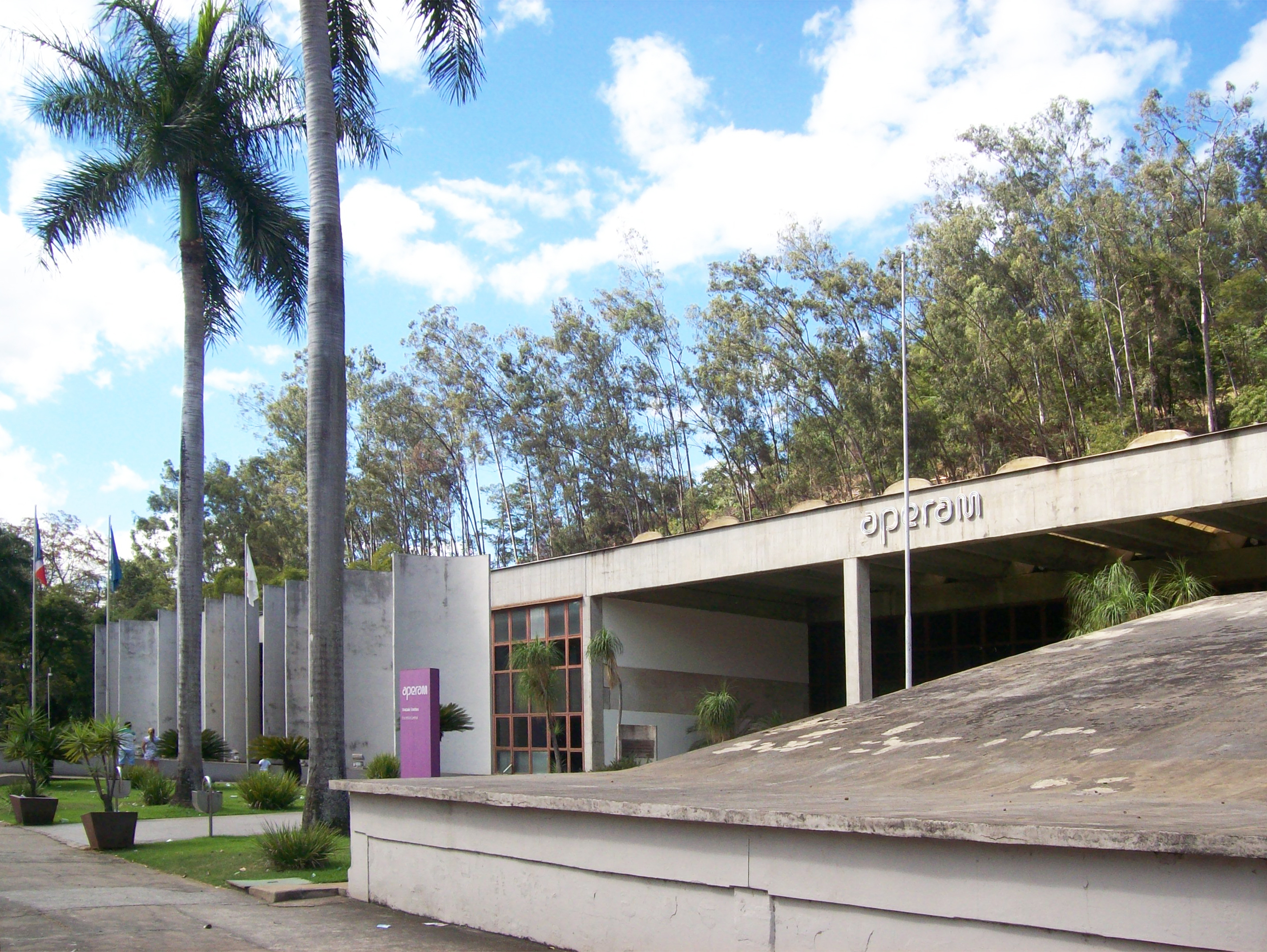
Central office of Aperam South America

In 2021, industry contributed 3,162,686.42 thousand reais to the municipal GDP. Much of this is due to the presence of Aperam South America, the largest producer of stainless steel and electrical steel in South America, with an annual production capacity of 800,000 to 900,000 tons of crude steel (in slabs). In 2015, it employed over 3,200 workers in Timóteo and northern Minas Gerais at Aperam Bioenergia, with about 20% of its production exported. The establishment of this industrial complex attracted supplier companies, complementary businesses, and service providers to Timóteo and surrounding municipalities.

Timóteo has two industrial districts, one being the Limoeiro Industrial District, located between the Limoeiro and Alphaville neighborhoods, and the other along the BR-381, between Aperam's industrial core and the Cachoeira do Vale district. Other industrial sectors include the production of clothing and accessories, extraction and processing of non-metallic minerals, manufacturing of furniture and fixtures, food and beverage production, machinery manufacturing, and products derived from metallurgy. According to 2010 statistics, 0.43% of the workforce was employed in extractive industries and 22.64% in manufacturing.

In 2010, 8.72% of the employed population worked in construction, 0.92% in public utilities, 15.30% in commerce, and 44.20% in services. In 2021, 1,275,599.13 thousand reais of the municipal GDP came from the gross added value of the service sector, and 442,677.99 thousand reais from public administration. Commercial activity in Timóteo is particularly significant in the Centro-Norte, where Acesita established a commercial center in the 1960s to serve the former workers' village. This area, now known as Acesita, is considered a metropolitan hub, attracting consumers from nearby cities due to its public services and commerce. More recently, commercial activity has expanded in the Funcionários and Timirim neighborhoods, which have easy access to Centro-Norte.

== Infrastructure ==
=== Healthcare ===
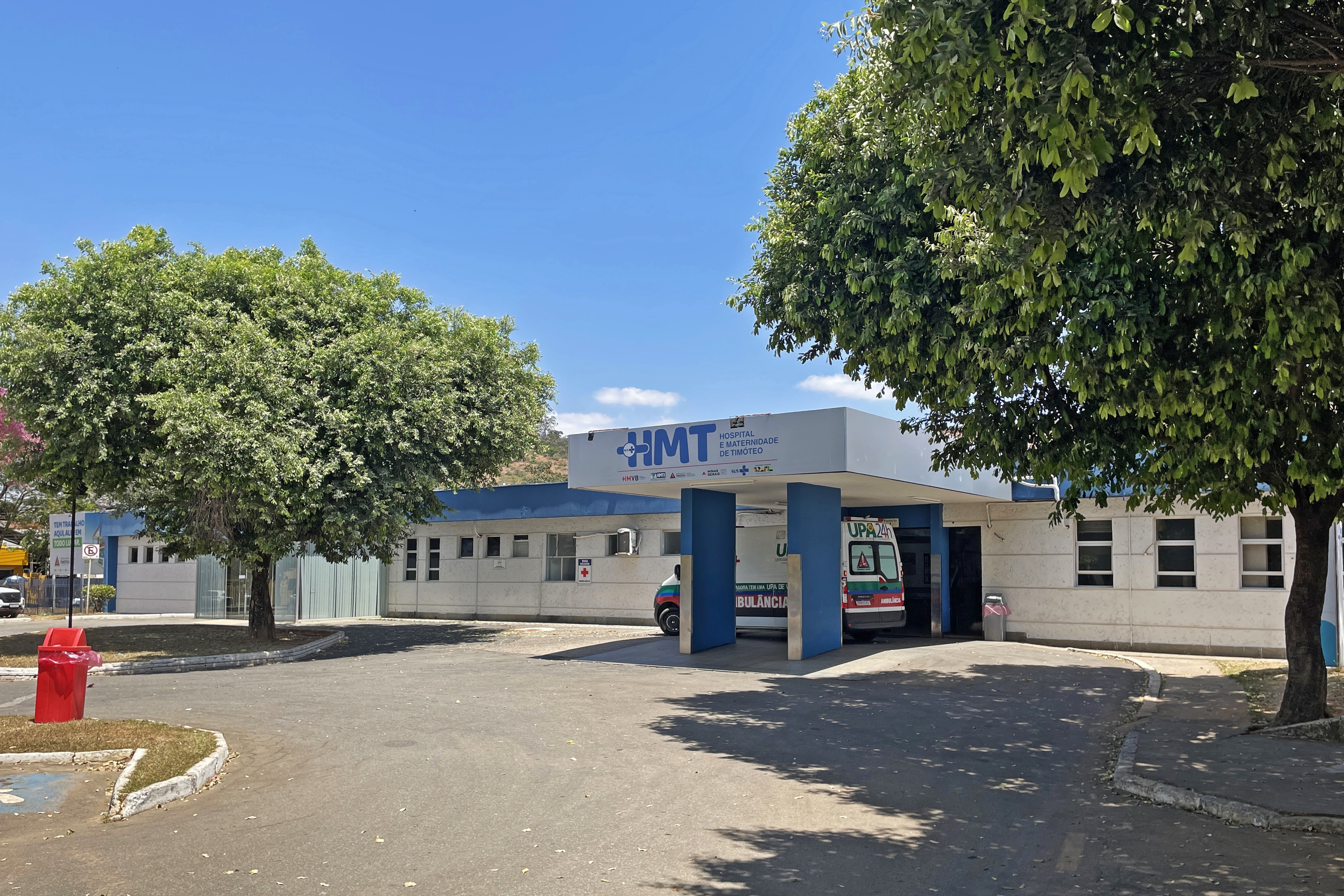
Emergency room of the Timóteo Hospital and Maternity (HMT)

Timóteo's healthcare network includes 15 primary healthcare units, one health center, one general hospital, and one Psychosocial Care Center (CAPS), according to 2018 data. In 2010, there were 0.55 nurses, 0.55 dentists, and 0.8 physicians per thousand inhabitants, compared to national averages of 0.69, 0.54, and 1.5, respectively. In 2015, there were also seven specialty centers distributed across the municipality.

The Timóteo Hospital and Maternity (HMT), formerly known as Acesita Hospital and Vital Brazil Hospital and Maternity, is located in the Timirim neighborhood and was constructed by the current Aperam South America in the 1950s. This healthcare facility is regarded as a regional reference for childbirth, as well as obstetrics and orthopedics. The João Otávio Health Center, located in the Olaria neighborhood, is managed by the municipal administration and provides clinical and emergency medical services. Additionally, there is the Geraldo dos Reis Ribeiro Emergency Care Unit (UPA), designed for 24-hour urgent care in the Primavera neighborhood, which was inaugurated on 24 January 2020.

Timóteo has two cemeteries, namely Recanto da Paz, in the Bela Vista neighborhood, and Jardim da Saudade, in the Santa Maria neighborhood. In 2022, 590 deaths were recorded due to morbidity, with diseases of the circulatory system being the leading cause of death (25.42%), followed by tumors (18.47%). During the same year, 894 live births were recorded, with the infant mortality rate standing at 5.59 deaths of children under one year of age per thousand live births. It is noteworthy that in 2010, 1.3% of girls aged 10 to 17 gave birth.

=== Education ===
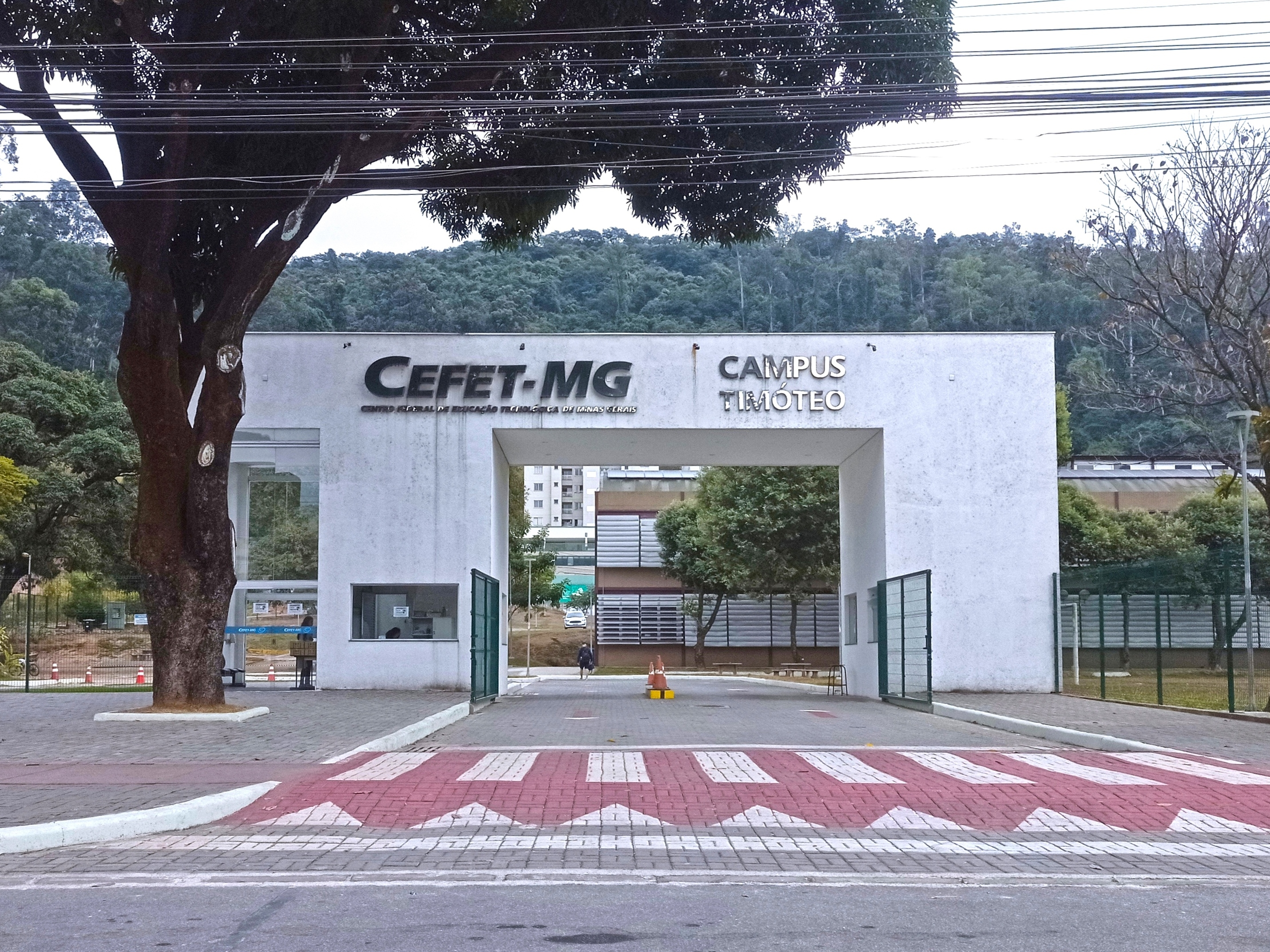
Entrance to the CEFET-MG campus in Timóteo

In the field of education, the average Basic Education Development Index (IDEB) score for students in the initial years of primary education in Timóteo's public schools was 6.6 in 2023, on a scale ranging from 1 to 10, while the score for students in the final years of primary education was 4.9. In 2022, 44.54% of children aged zero to three years, 93.32% of those aged four to five years, and 99.3% of those aged six to 14 years were enrolled in schools, along with 91% of adolescents aged 15 to 17 years. Additionally, 27.79% of residents aged 18 to 24 years and 6.76% of those aged 25 years or older were also attending educational institutions.

Among residents aged 18 years or older in 2022, 24.64% had not completed primary education, 15.44% had completed only primary education, 41.25% had completed secondary education, and 18.67% had completed higher education, with the population aged eleven years or older having an average of 10.3 years of schooling. The literacy rate among residents aged 15 years or older was 96.88%, resulting in 3.12% of individuals in this age group being illiterate. In 2023, there were 15,313 enrollments in the city's early childhood education, primary, and secondary education institutions.

The Federal Center for Technological Education of Minas Gerais (CEFET), whose campus is located in Centro-Norte, serves regional demand by offering free secondary education combined with technical education and higher education courses. In addition to CEFET, there are campuses of private technical and higher education institutions. Aperam South America maintains a Professional Training Center, offering technical courses in partnership with the National Service for Industrial Training (SENAI) and internship opportunities at the company. Through the Aperam Acesita Foundation, Aperam also occasionally provides qualification courses.

Education in Timóteo in numbers (2023)
Level	Enrollments	Teachers	Schools (total)
Early childhood education	3,650	257	38
Primary education	8,639	548	28
Secondary education	3,024	294	10

=== Housing, services, and communications ===
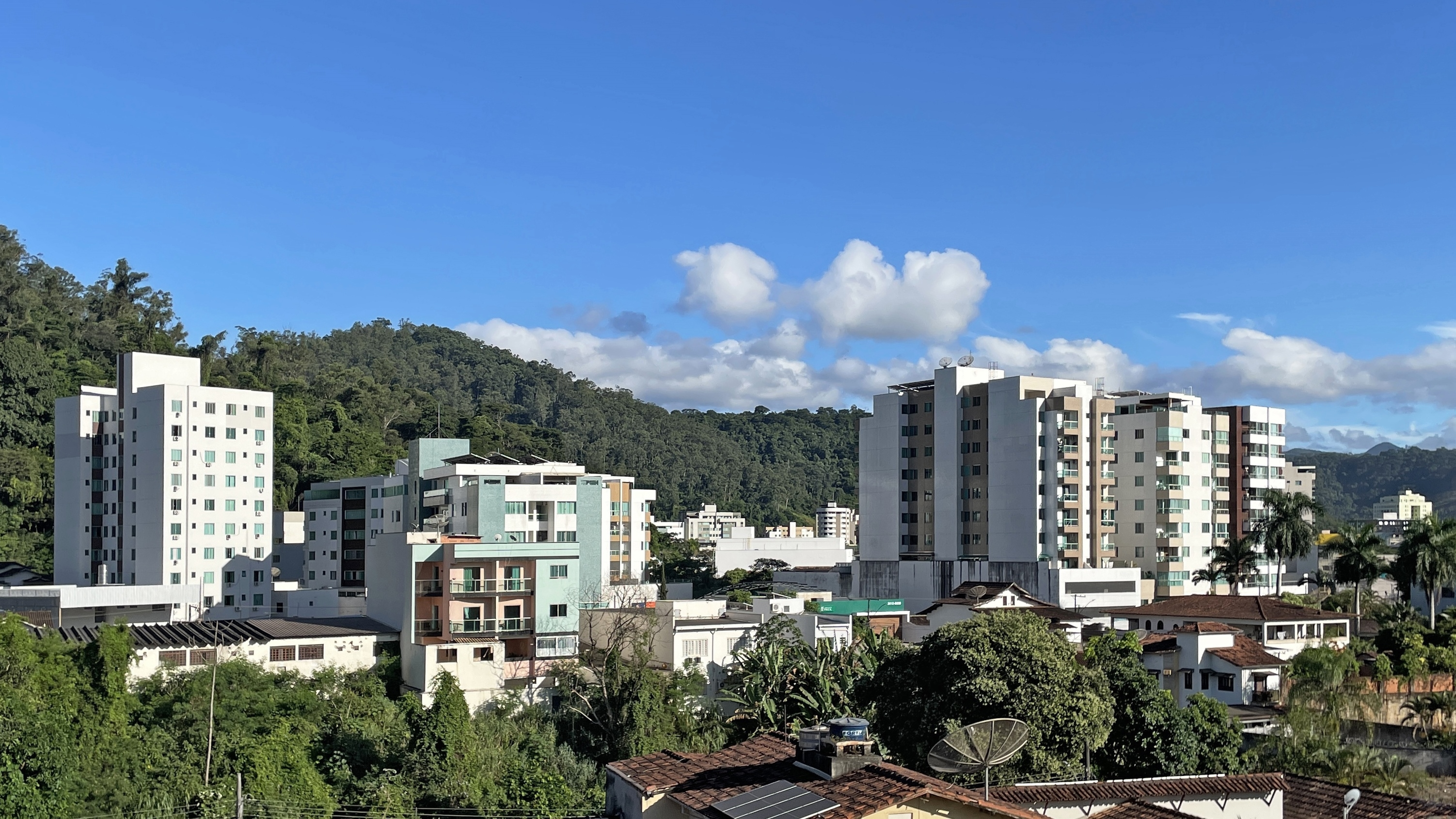
Residential buildings in the Funcionários neighborhood

In 2022, Timóteo had 30,026 occupied permanent private households. Of these, 21,984 were houses (73.22%), 7,769 were apartments (25.87%), 137 were houses in villages or condominiums (0.46%), 101 were tenements (0.34%), and 35 were degraded or unfinished structures (0.12%). Of the total occupied households, 21,393 were owned (71.20%), with 19,263 fully paid and 2,130 in the process of acquisition; 6,611 were rented (22.00%); 1,905 were borrowed or lent (6.34%); and 138 were occupied in other ways (0.46%). The municipality has a Municipal Master Plan that regulates geographic and urban parameters for the construction of residences, buildings, and commercial establishments.

Water supply and sewage collection services are provided by the Minas Gerais Sanitation Company (Copasa). In 2022, according to IBGE, 91.46% of households had the general water network as their main supply source, and 99.90% had a bathroom for exclusive household use. Regarding sewage disposal, 94.53% of households were served by the general or stormwater network. Much of the water used to supply the city and the Vale do Aço region comes from an alluvial aquifer located underground, extracted and treated at Copasa's water treatment plant in the Amaro Lanari neighborhood, in Coronel Fabriciano. However, Timóteo has three smaller water intake points that exclusively serve the municipality. Sewage, on the other hand, was released directly into the urban area's watercourses without treatment until 2019, when a wastewater treatment plant began operating in the Limoeiro neighborhood, initially intended to serve 165,000 residents of Timóteo and Coronel Fabriciano.

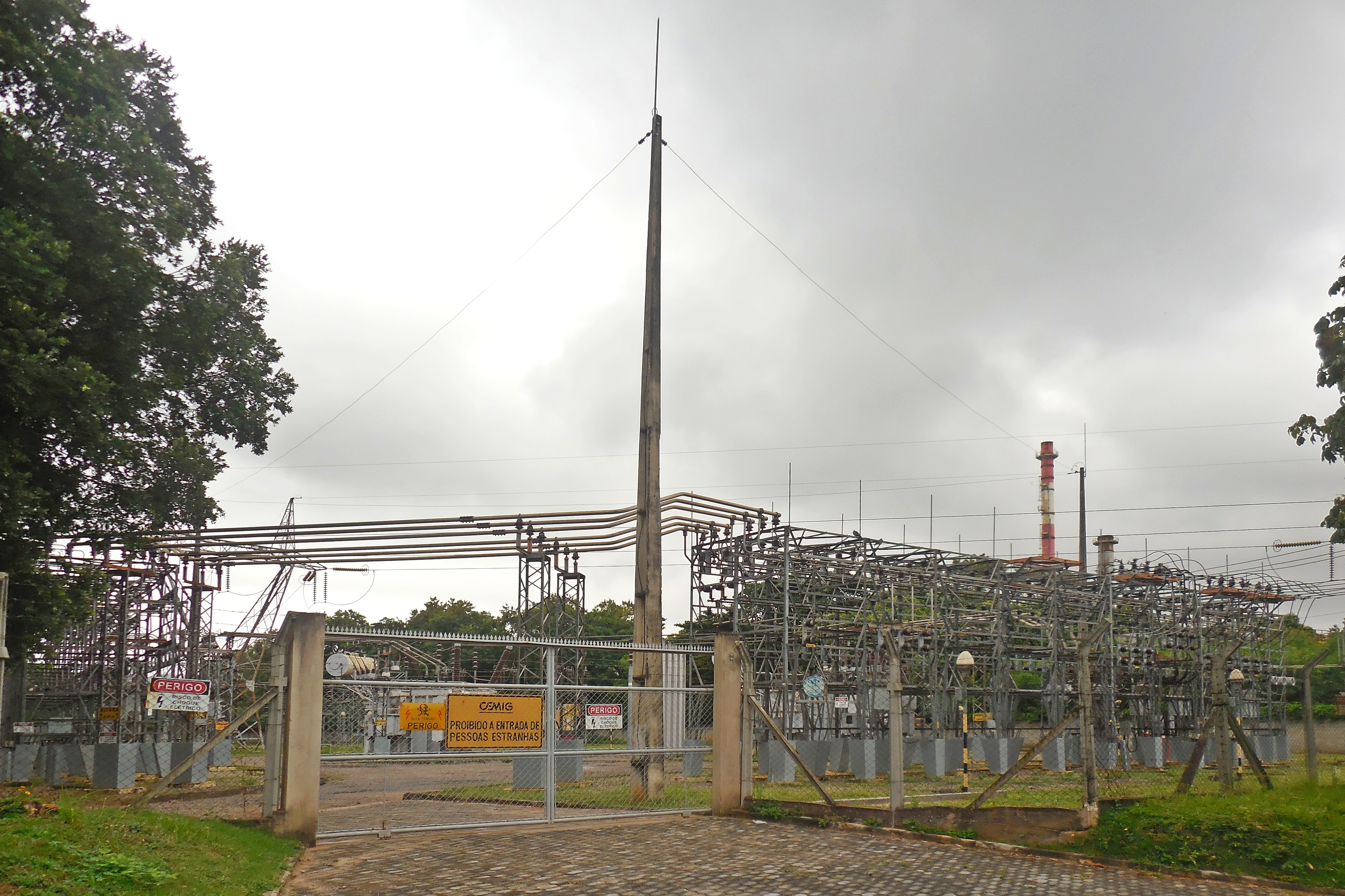
Substation of CEMIG in Timóteo

The electricity supply service is provided by the Minas Gerais Energy Company (Cemig), which also serves much of the state of Minas Gerais. In 2010, 99.91% of households had access to the electrical network, according to IBGE. Regarding waste disposal, according to the 2022 census, 99.36% of households were served by waste collection. The collected waste is sent to the Vale do Aço Waste Center (CRVA), located in Santana do Paraíso, with an average of 40 tons of waste produced daily in 2012. Until 2005, the city's waste was disposed of in an open-air landfill near the Piracicaba River, known as the Mauá Bridge landfill, which also served Coronel Fabriciano. This area was closed and designated for preservation, but soil and water contamination persisted due to the lack of environmental recovery.

According to data from the National Telecommunications Agency (Anatel), Timóteo had 271 payphones in 2016. The area code (DDD) is 031, and the postal code (CEP) ranges from 35180–001 to 35184–999. In January 2009, the municipality began to be served by number portability, along with other municipalities sharing the same DDD. Portability allows users to change operators without changing their phone numbers. Postal services are provided by Correios agencies in the Centro-Norte and Centro-Sul neighborhoods. Among the city's radio stations, Tropical FM, established on 9 November 2007, and Itatiaia Vale stand out as major stations in the Vale do Aço Metropolitan Region. Regarding local daily newspapers, Diário do Aço and Diário Popular, published in Ipatinga, and Folha do Aço, edited in Timóteo, are notable.

=== Safety and crime ===
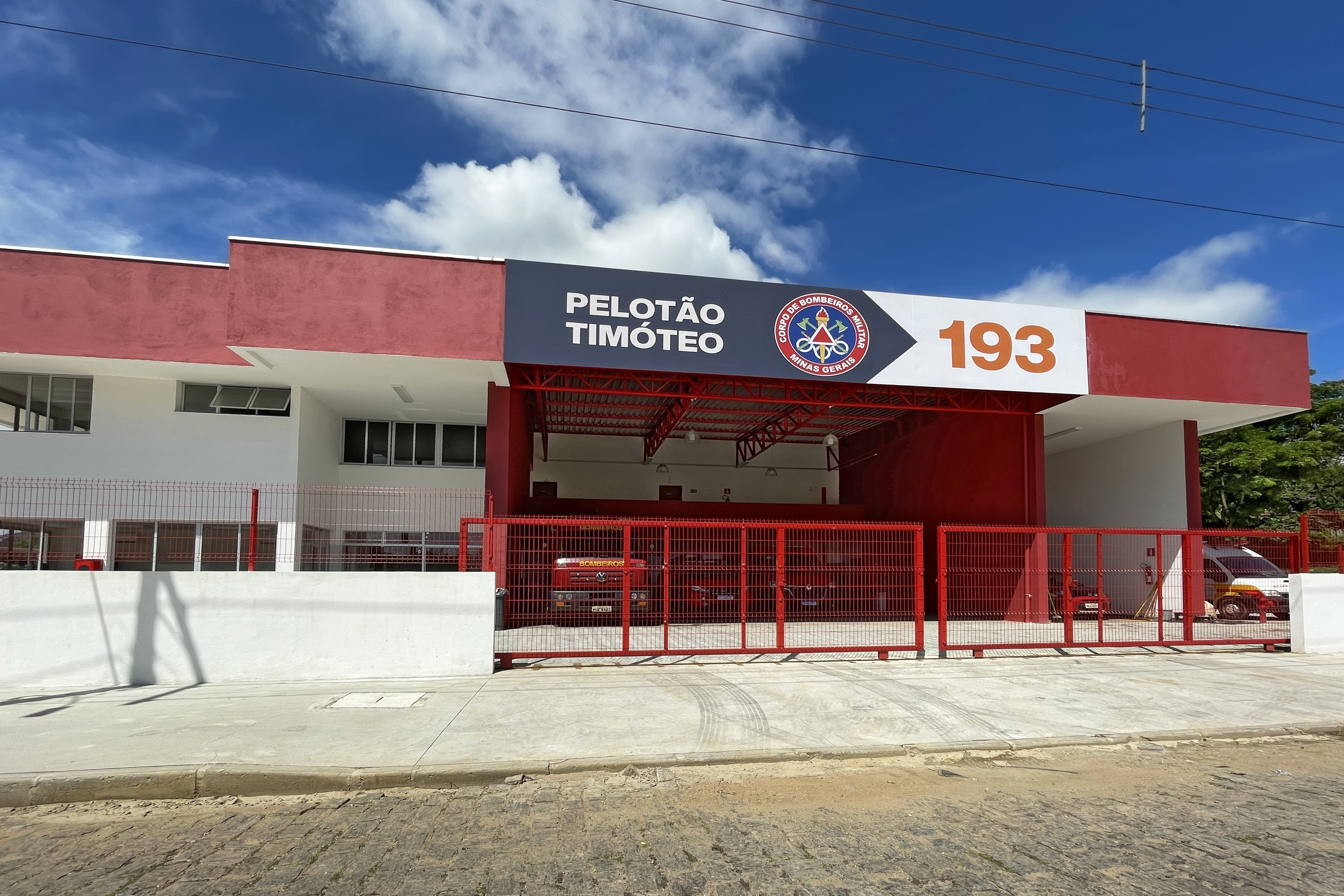
Fire brigade of the Fire Department in Cruzeirinho

Public safety in Timóteo is provided by various organizations. The Military Police, a state force, is responsible for ostensible policing in the city, bank patrols, environmental, prison, school, and special event patrols, as well as community engagement initiatives, with a Military Police Company based in the municipality, subordinate to the Coronel Fabriciano Battalion. The Civil Police aims to investigate and address crimes and infractions and is represented in Timóteo by an Integrated Public Safety Area (AISP), subordinate to the Ipatinga Regional Civil Police Station. The city is served by a Fire Department brigade and also has a civil defense, subordinate to the municipal government.

In 2022, 24 homicides were recorded, a decrease from 28 in 2021. The worst year between 2000 and 2022 was 2014, with 31 incidents. However, these numbers are proportionally high relative to the population, exceeding those of the state capital and the most populous municipalities in the Vale do Aço. Most homicides are related to drug trafficking, which also contributes to other crimes, as drug users often steal to support their addictions. There are also records of deaths caused by disputes among criminal organizations established in the city, particularly in peripheral neighborhoods, reflecting socioeconomic inequality. Many offenders are sent to the city's prison in the Primavera neighborhood, which has faced issues of overcrowding and riots.

=== Transportation ===
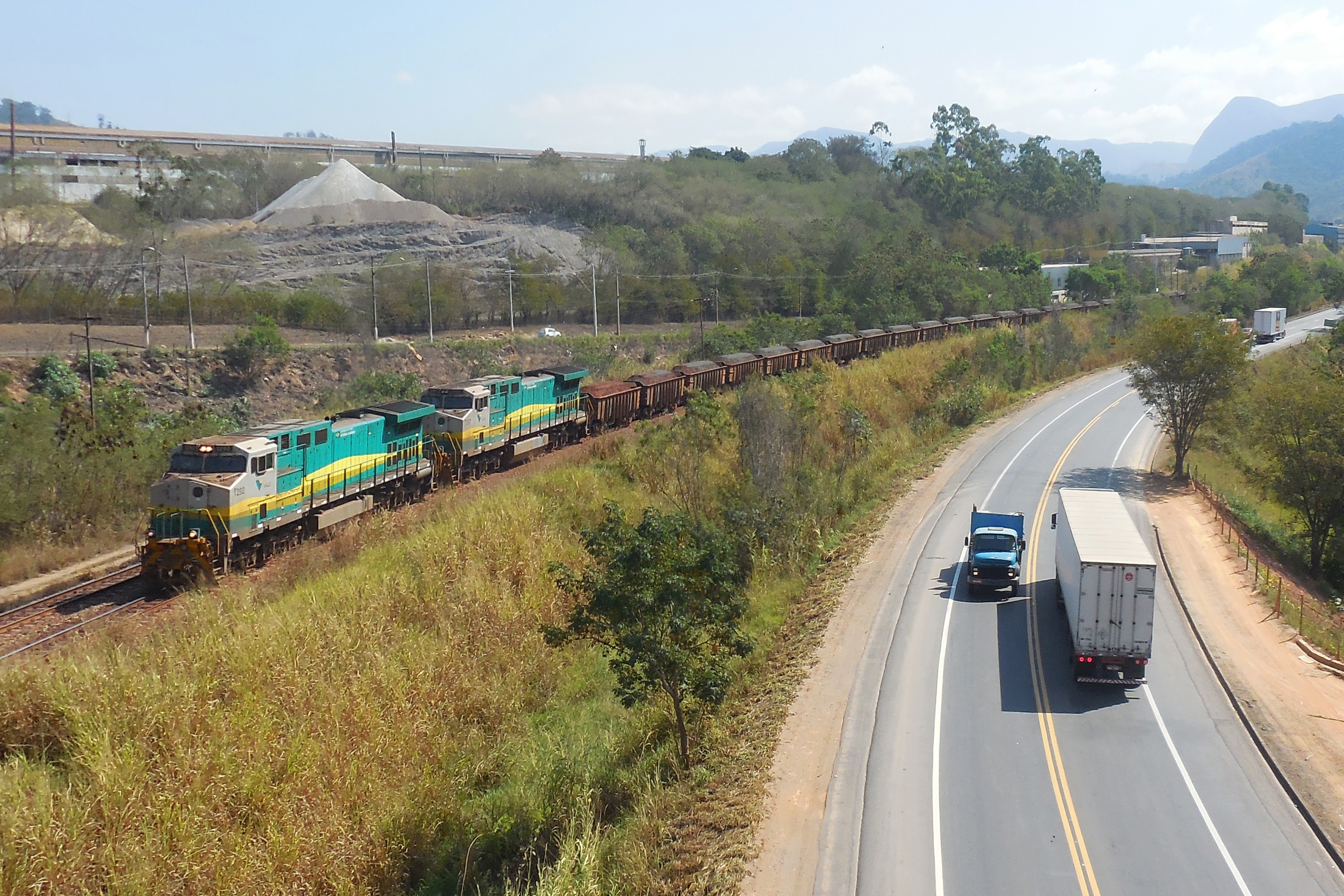
Vale train transporting iron ore on the EFVM to the left of BR-381 in Timóteo

Timóteo is served by the Vitória-Minas Railway (EFVM), operated by Vale, which is a key means of transporting iron ore extracted in Itabira to Aperam South America and for exporting the company's production. The Mário Carvalho Station facilitates passenger transport with daily stops for trains traveling between the metropolitan areas of Vitória and Belo Horizonte. Among regular public transportation options, the EFVM is the most affordable travel option for several cities with stations.

The municipality has one of the region's main bus terminals, located in Centro-Norte and inaugurated in January 1983. The city is served by BR-381, the main access route to the state capital and Espírito Santo; and by LMG-760, connecting the urban area to BR-262 through the Cava Grande district in Marliéria. The municipal vehicle fleet in 2023 totaled 50,371 vehicles, including 27,825 cars, 12,893 motorcycles, 3,123 pickups, 1,557 SUVs, 1,137 trucks, 981 trailers, 895 scooters, 556 utility vehicles, 407 mopeds, 313 semi-trailers, 262 tractor-trailers, 201 minibuses, 186 buses, 17 tricycles, nine wheeled tractors, four sidecars, and five classified as other types of vehicles. The urban area occasionally experiences traffic congestion due to increased vehicle flow. Near commercial hubs, parking availability is sometimes limited, impacting local businesses. Proposals such as implementing a paid parking system have been considered and implemented.

Public transportation in the municipality is managed by Saritur, with 19 bus lines operating in 2012. Through the integration terminal, built for line transfers, passengers can take two municipal buses for the price of one fare. Univale Transportes provides intercity lines connecting Acesita (Centro-Norte) and Timóteo (Centro-Sul) to other municipalities in the Vale do Aço Metropolitan Region. Cycling infrastructure in the city includes bike paths and lanes on some roads, though most lack paving and continuity. Sidewalk infrastructure is also deficient in many neighborhoods, with issues such as irregularities, obstacles, and lack of continuity. In the metropolitan region, air transportation is available through Ipatinga Airport, which offers daily flights to the Greater Belo Horizonte area.

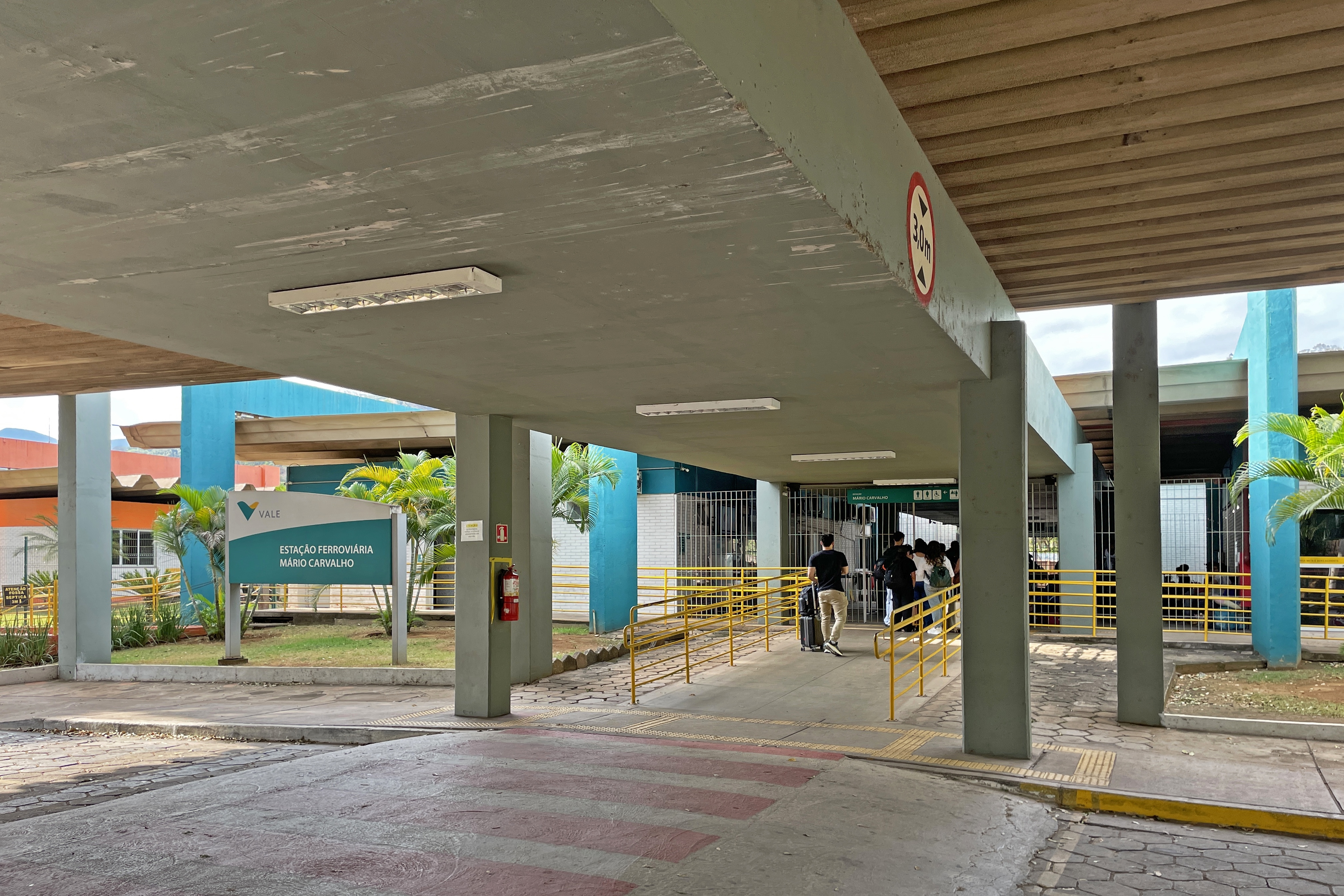
Entrance to the Mário Carvalho Station, a stop on the Vitória-Minas Railway.

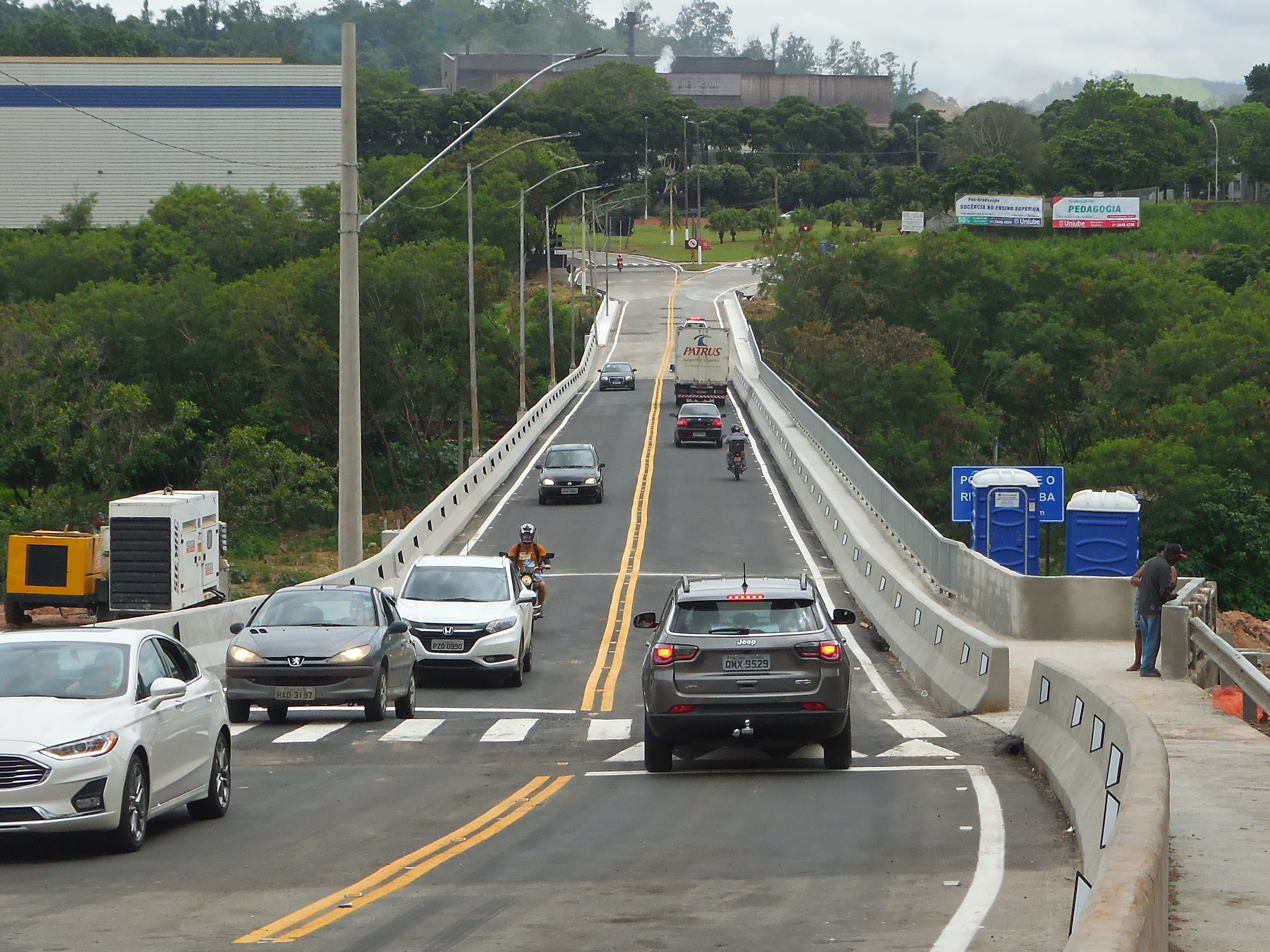
The "old bridge", one of the city's access routes, seen from Coronel Fabriciano.

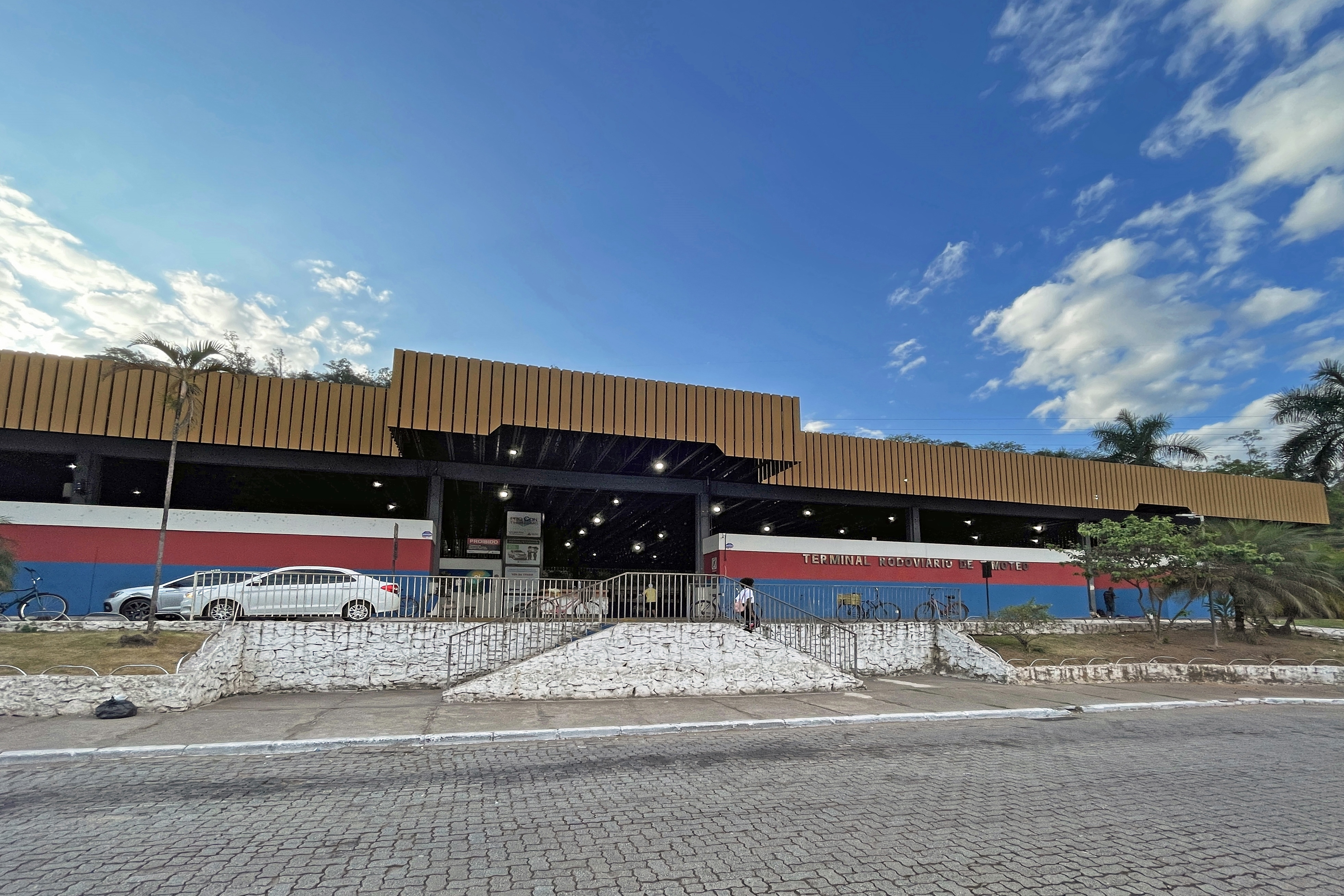
Timóteo Bus Terminal in Centro-Norte

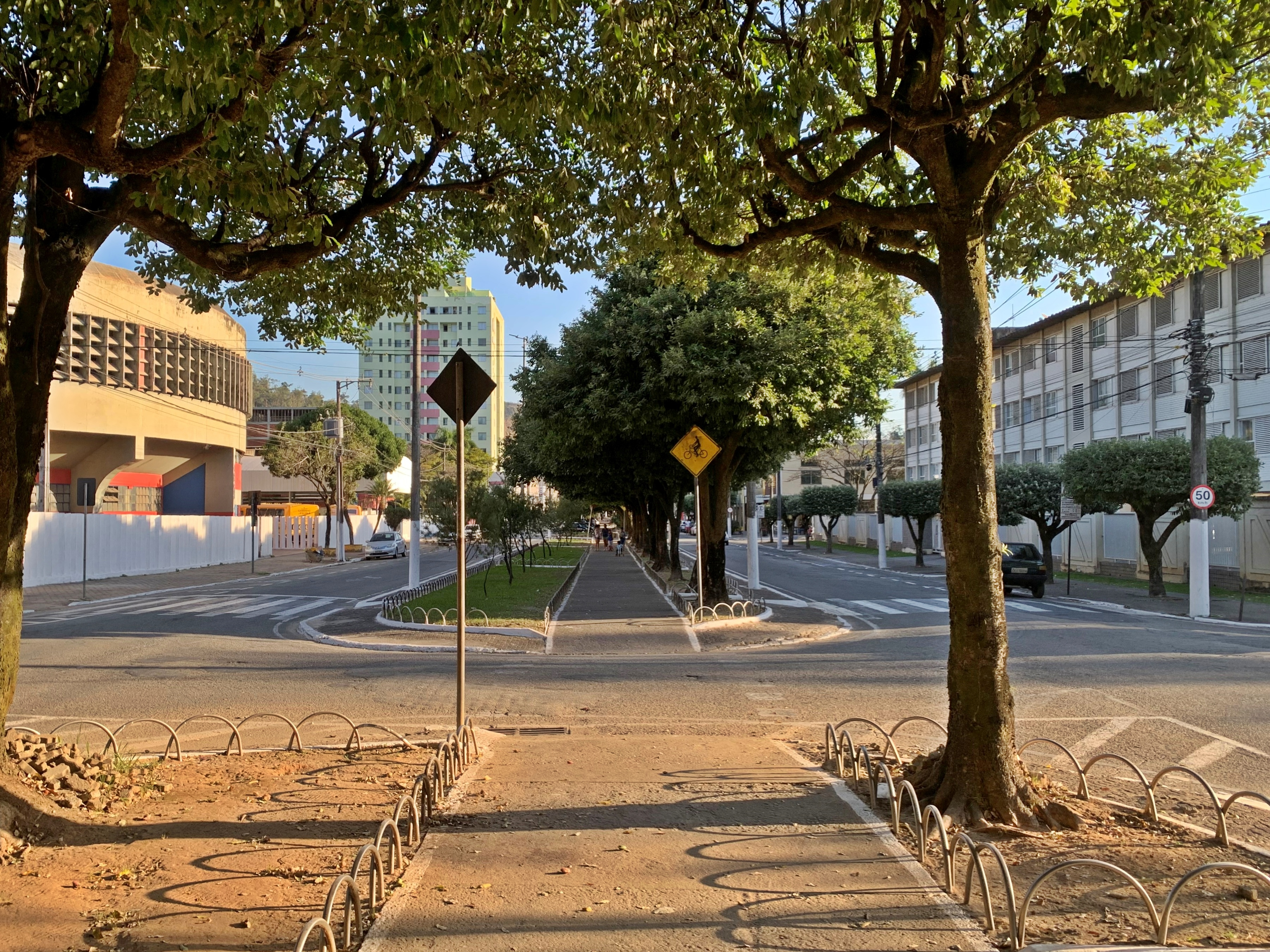
Pathway for cyclists and pedestrians on Alameda 31 de Outubro

== Culture ==
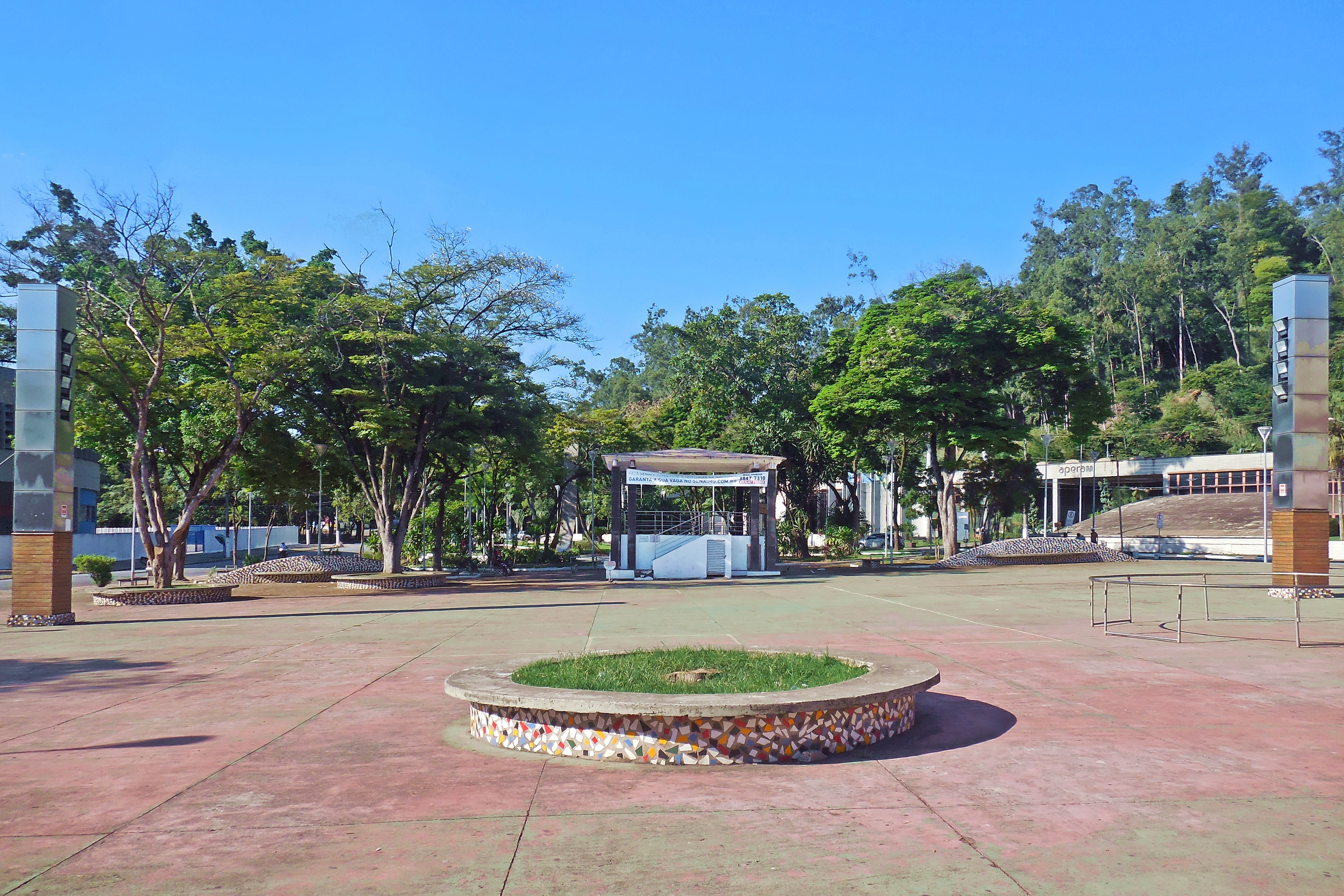
May 1st Square, a leisure and event space in Centro-Norte

The first investments in leisure facilities were made by the former Acesita company to encourage workers to settle in the company’s workers' village. Initially, civic celebrations and football tournaments were organized, followed by the creation of clubs such as the Elite Club and the Workers’ Club, which also hosted theater and music performances. The Marabá Cinema, originally Acesita Cinema, was established in the 1950s and relocated to a new building in the commercial center of the workers' village (now Centro-Norte) in the 1970s, but it was deactivated and converted into a commercial establishment in the 1990s. Centro-Sul, meanwhile, had older cultural traditions, such as the Nossa Senhora do Rosário Congado Group, dating back to 1895, and street carnival celebrations in the 1940s.

Following emancipation in 1964, the municipal government increased investments in public squares and sports centers throughout the city. Timóteo has a municipal culture council and a heritage preservation board, both with equal representation and deliberative and oversight roles. There are also municipal laws protecting tangible cultural heritage, managed by a dedicated municipal culture department, which oversees cultural activities in the municipality. Despite public sector involvement, Aperam South America, through the Aperam Acesita Foundation, also supports arts and cultural facilities, including projects funded by the Rouanet Law.

In 2013, the following tangible assets were listed as municipal cultural heritage: the forest of the Rio Doce State Park, Percival Farquhar State School, the former Technical Metallurgy School, the "Biquinha" spring, and Getúlio Vargas State School. The only listed movable asset was the Oratory of the Holy Spirit. However, in 2022, the Hoffmann Kiln was also listed. The municipality’s cultural policy score for the 2024 Cultural ICMS calculation was 3.00 on a scale of 0 to 4. The total score, factoring in conservation, expenditure, and the number of listed or registered assets, was 9.83.

=== Cultural expressions and spaces ===
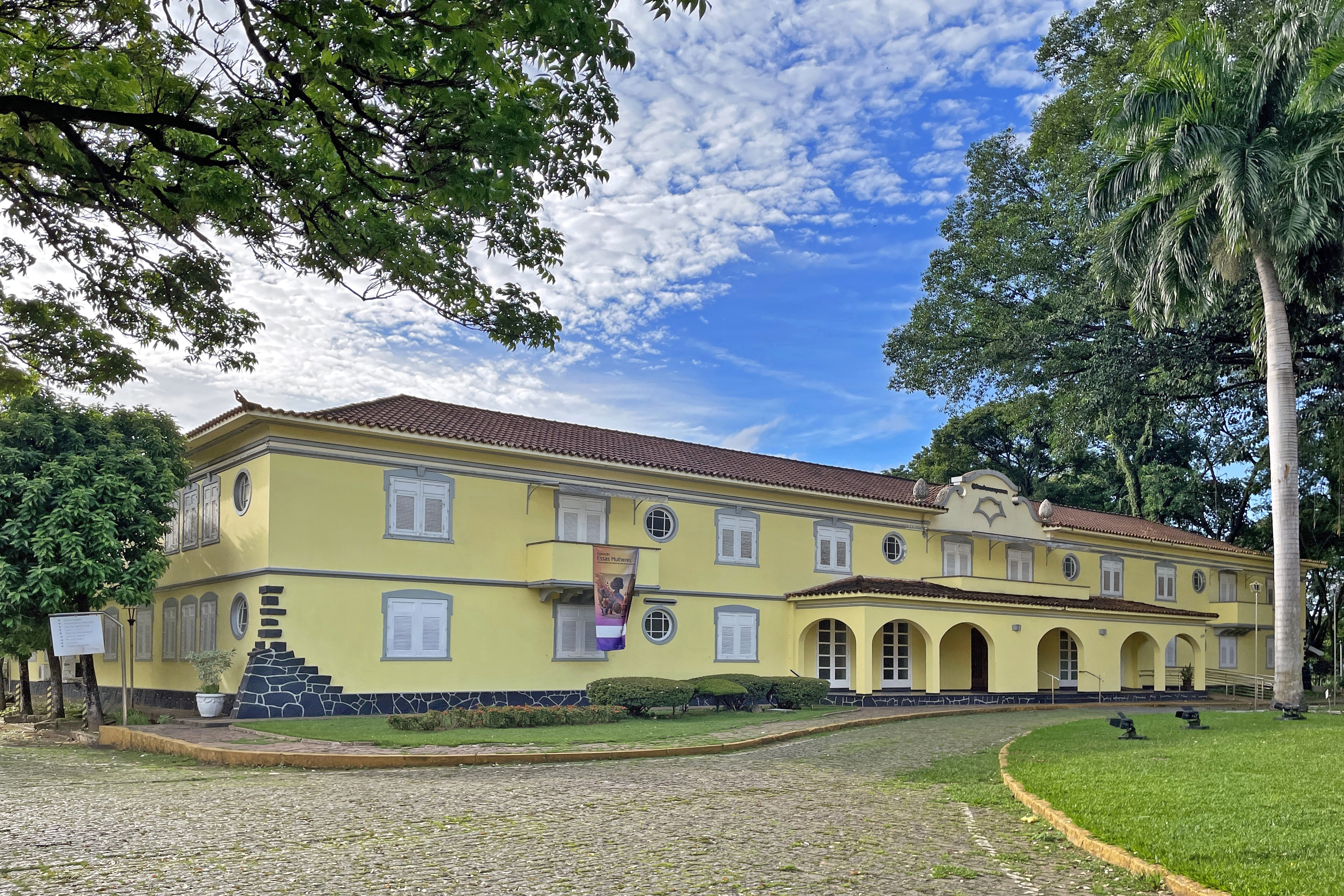
Aperam Acesita Foundation Cultural Center

The city boasts a rich and diverse folklore. According to IBGE in 2012, there are artistic groups dedicated to choirs, folklore, and musical performances. Handicrafts are one of the most prominent forms of cultural expression in Timóteo, with IBGE noting that the main artisanal activities involve fruits and seeds, wood, and metal. Another significant cultural expression is the Nossa Senhora do Rosário Congado Group, introduced by Manoel Berto de Lima in 1895, which performs in honor of Our Lady of the Rosary during festive occasions.

Carnival celebrations originated in what is now Praça 29 de Abril, in Centro-Sul, where residents began gathering in the 1940s to dance in masks and costumes, inspired by marchinhas played on battery-powered radios. In the 1960s, these festivities moved to city clubs, evolving with the formation of samba schools and carnival blocks. In the 1980s, the municipal government, in partnership with Acesita, began organizing a street carnival in Centro-Norte, involving local carnival groups. Though not held regularly, it has attracted over 40,000 people, featuring block parades and musical performances.

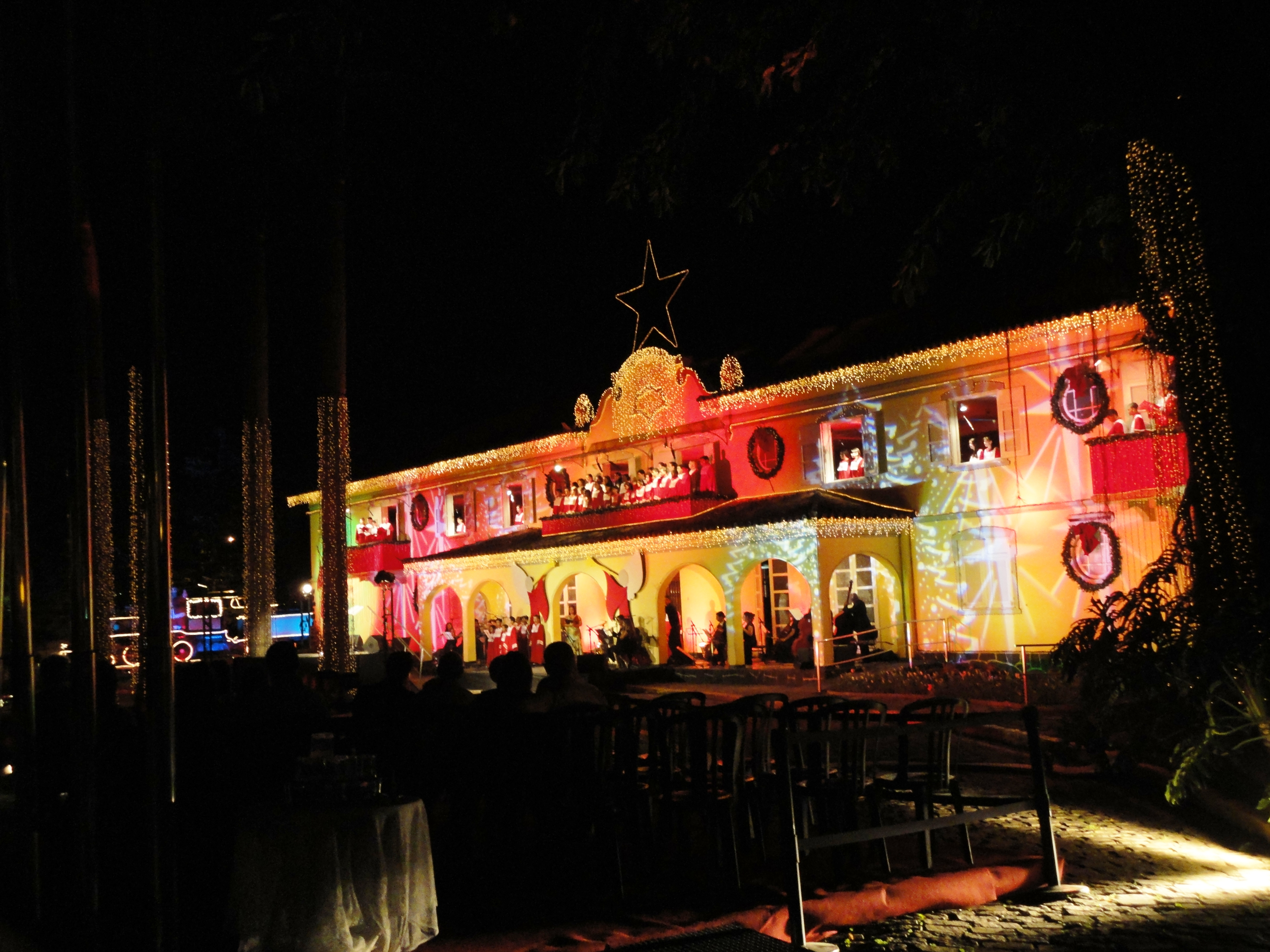
Aperam Acesita Foundation during its Christmas carol

The Feast of Saint Sebastian (the municipal patron saint), the Saint Sebastian Rustic Race, the Rosário Feast (with the congado group’s participation), the city’s anniversary celebrations in April, the Feast of Our Lady of Aparecida, and the Christmas carol by the Aperam Acesita Foundation are other examples of popular cultural expressions in the municipality. On Corpus Christi, carpets are crafted on neighborhood streets by parishes, continuing a tradition that dates back to 1930. Among the cultural spaces dedicated to preserving and promoting popular expressions, the city has publicly maintained libraries, theaters, stadiums, sports gyms, clubs, recreational associations, and a public archive, according to IBGE in 2005 and 2012.

Through the Rouanet Law, Aperam South America, via the Aperam Acesita Foundation and in partnership with the municipal government and other local entities, periodically organizes a variety of programs, including workshops and cultural performances. The Aperam Acesita Foundation Cultural Center (formerly Acesita’s guest house), opened in October 1994, houses a theater, a museum, and spaces for exhibitions, courses, and theater classes, which are also available to the community. The foundation extends its activities with events in schools and major public squares and open areas, accessible to the general population.

=== Landmarks and attractions ===
==== Rural and natural attractions ====
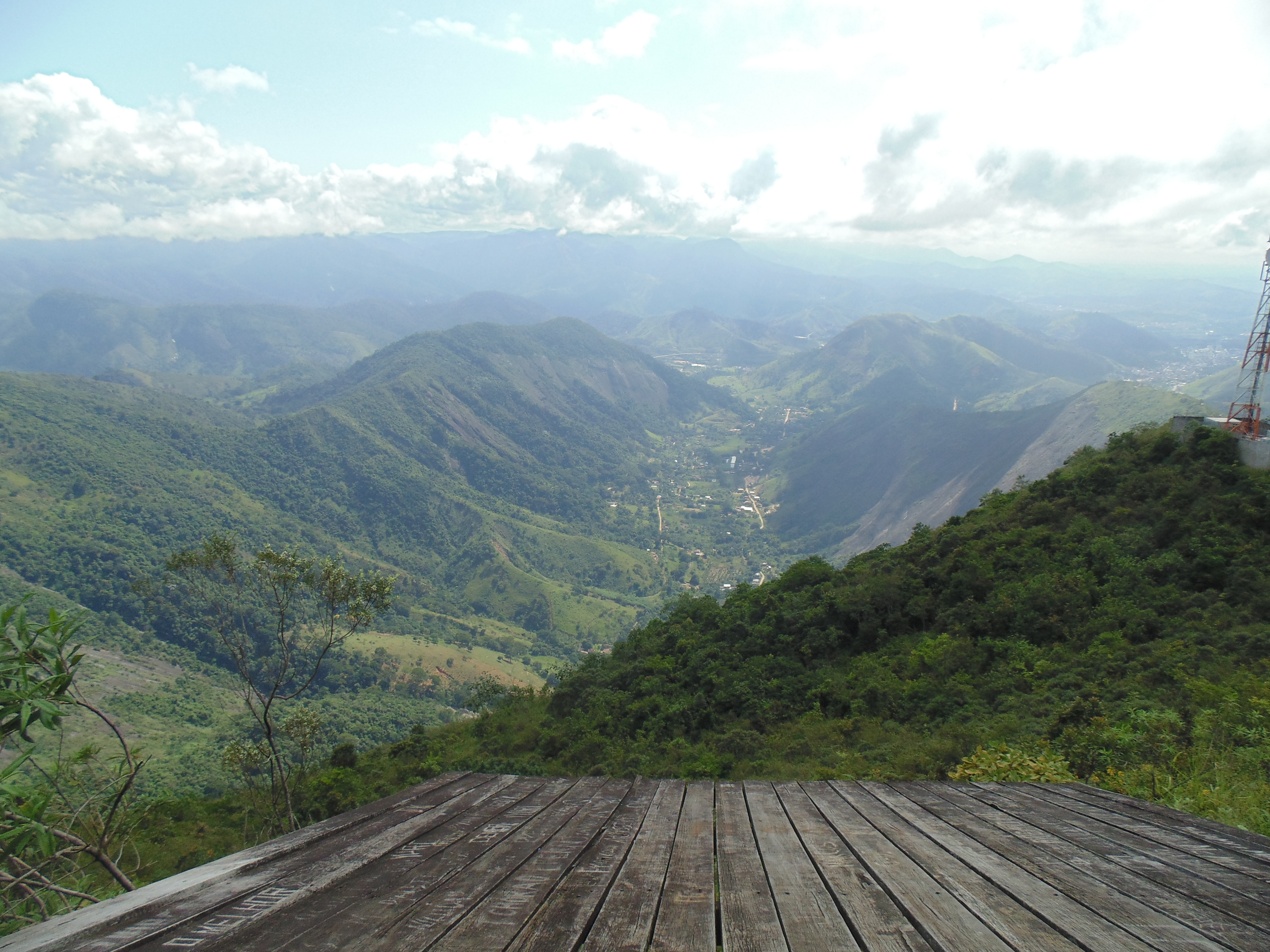
View of the Petrópolis neighborhood from the summit of Ana Moura Peak

Timóteo is part of the Minas Gerais Atlantic Forest Tourist Circuit, established in 2010 by the Minas Gerais State Tourism Secretariat to promote tourism in participating cities. Among the natural attractions, the Ana Moura Peak stands out as the municipality’s highest point, reaching 864 meters in altitude. Its summit is open to visitors and features communication antennas, a paragliding launch ramp, and is used for climbing.

In the Petrópolis neighborhood, a key access point to the Ana Moura Peak, there are farm hotels, rural properties, and trails used for hiking and motocross. The forests of the Rio Doce State Park (PERD), listed as municipal cultural heritage, are also noteworthy. At the Oikós Project’s environmental education center, maintained by Aperam South America and integrated with the PERD, visitors can explore a preserved section of the Atlantic Forest, with trails, lookouts, a ropes course, and a library.

==== Urban landmarks ====
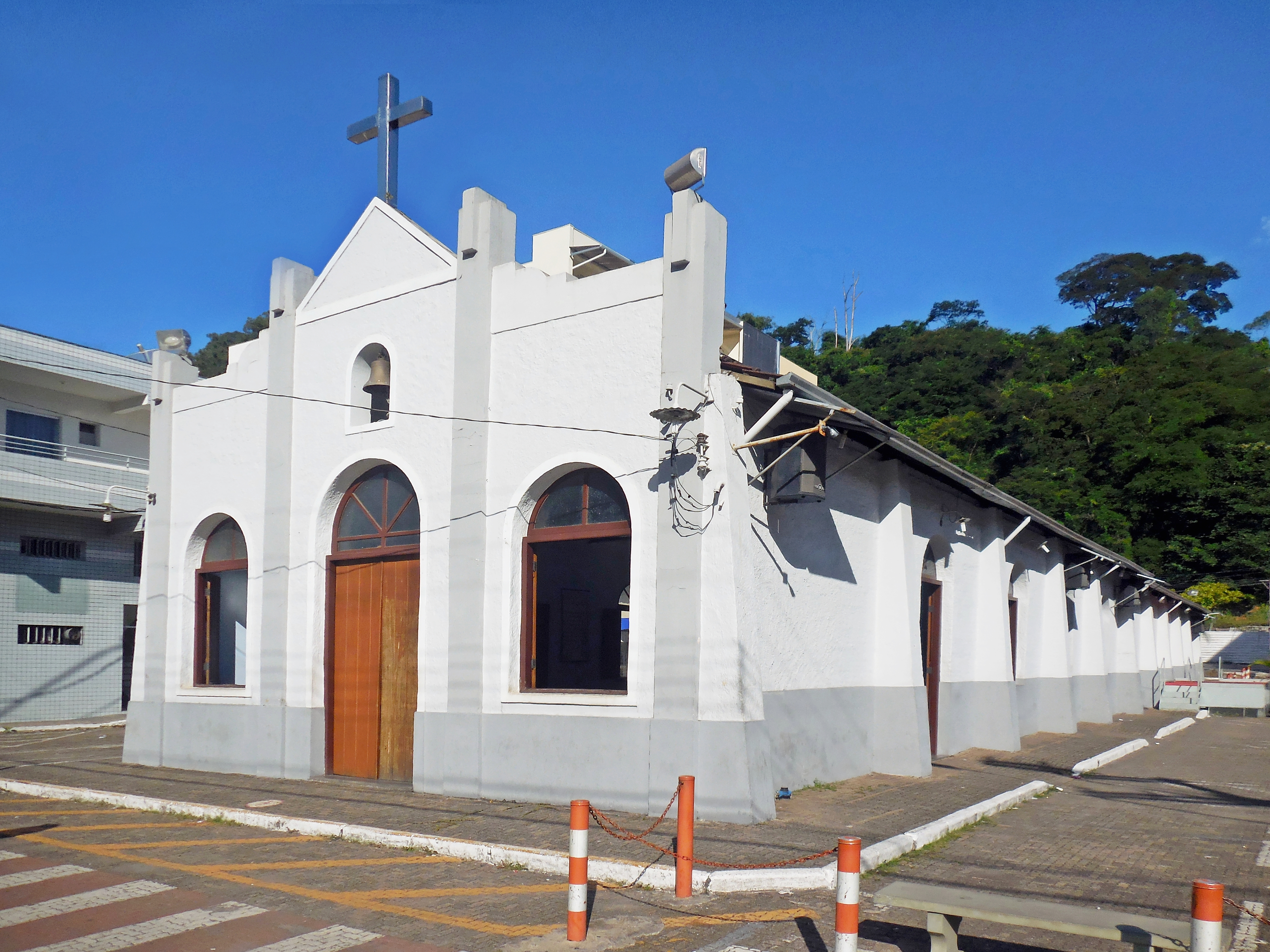
São José Operário Church in 2017

The urban area features several attractions considered major city landmarks due to their heritage or symbolic importance. The São José Operário Church in Praça 1º de Maio, also known as "São José de Acesita Church" or "Centro Church," was built by Acesita in 1947 to serve the religious needs of the company’s workers' village. The church, which can seat about 100 people and accommodate 300 standing, is too small for some events, which attract over 1,500 attendees, requiring outdoor activities. To address space constraints while preserving its original architecture, a new church was built on Rua 20 de Novembro in the same area, with its cornerstone laid on 2 August 2018. The new church was inaugurated on 14 December 2023 and dedicated to Our Lady of Mount Carmel in 2025.

The São José do Timirim Church, located atop the Timirim neighborhood, began construction in 1950 to serve as the main church of the São José Parish. Completed 27 years later, it was modeled after the Saint Peter’s Basilica in Vatican City. The São Sebastião Parish Church, headquarters of the São Sebastião Parish in Centro-Sul, began construction in 1950 to replace a wooden church built in 1915, which itself had replaced the settlement’s first chapel. At the access roundabout to Coronel Fabriciano via the old BR-381 bridge, the Sinergia Monument stands, designed by sculptor Wilma Noel. Installed in the 1990s, it represents the municipal administrations of the three main Vale do Aço cities (Coronel Fabriciano, Ipatinga, and Timóteo), also known as the "Three Cities" monument.

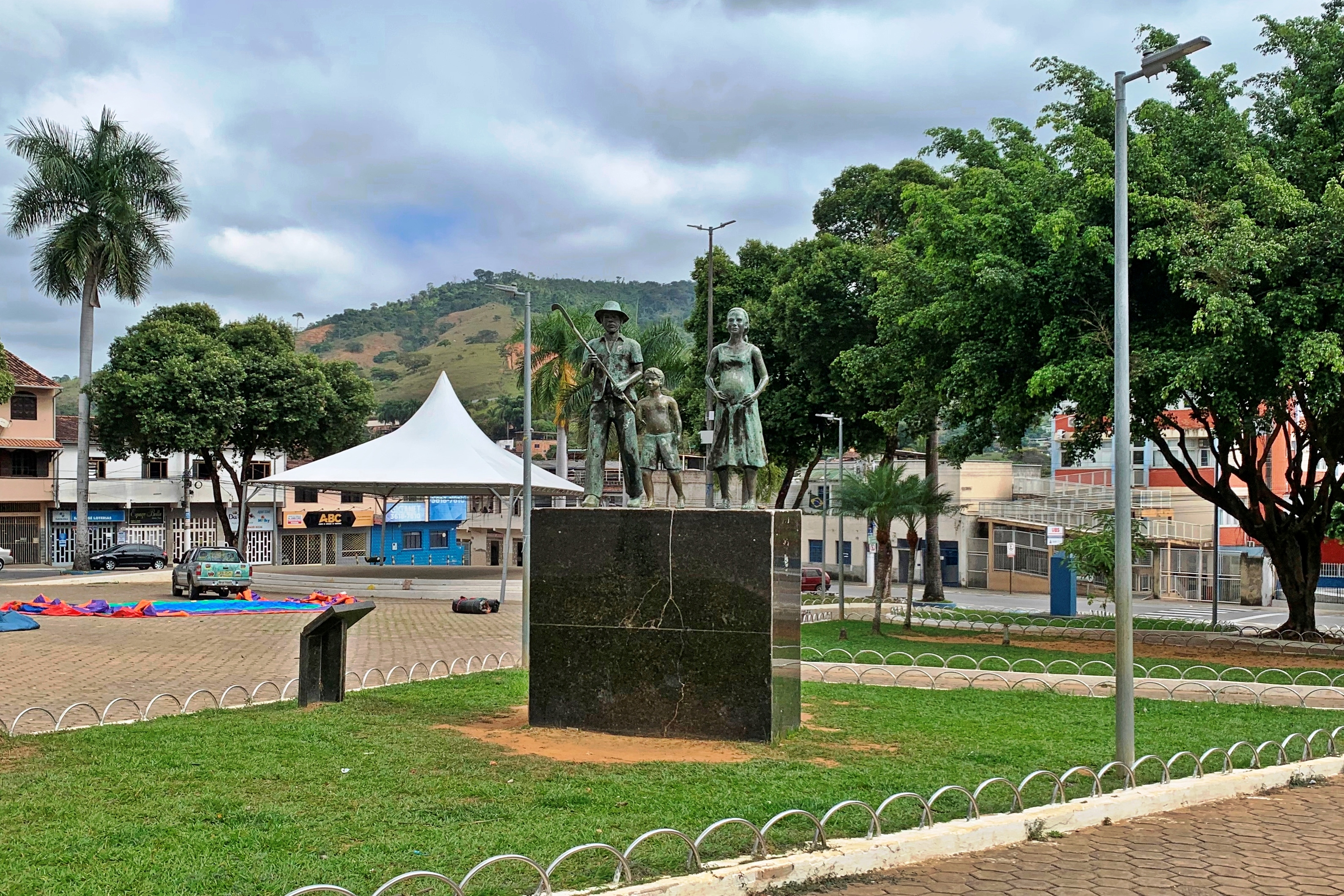
April 29 Square, a reference point in Centro-Sul

In the Timirim neighborhood, the Praça do Coliseu, designed by architect Éolo Maia and built in 1983, features an open-air theater for cultural activities. Also in 1983, Éolo Maia designed the Percival Farquhar State School in the Vale Verde neighborhood, notable for its self-supporting solid brick structures. The Hoffmann Kiln, located in the Novo Horizonte neighborhood, was built in 1945 to produce bricks for the Acesita workers' village’s residences. Deactivated in the 1960s, it briefly served as a nightclub but was later sealed off due to its deteriorating condition. Despite partial collapse of its walls and roof, it is used for studies and occasionally hosts cultural activities. In May 2023, a service order was signed for the development of a restoration project.

Other cultural assets include the former Technical Metallurgy School, built by Acesita in 1963 and acquired by the municipal government in 1994 after its deactivation; the "Biquinha," a spring used by early 20th-century residents of the São Sebastião de Timóteo settlement; and the Getúlio Vargas State School, located in the Funcionários neighborhood and inaugurated in 1948. As previously mentioned, these sites are listed as municipal cultural heritage. Also noteworthy are April 29 Square and May 1 Square, in Centro-Sul and Centro-Norte respectively, which are among the region’s main leisure and event venues.

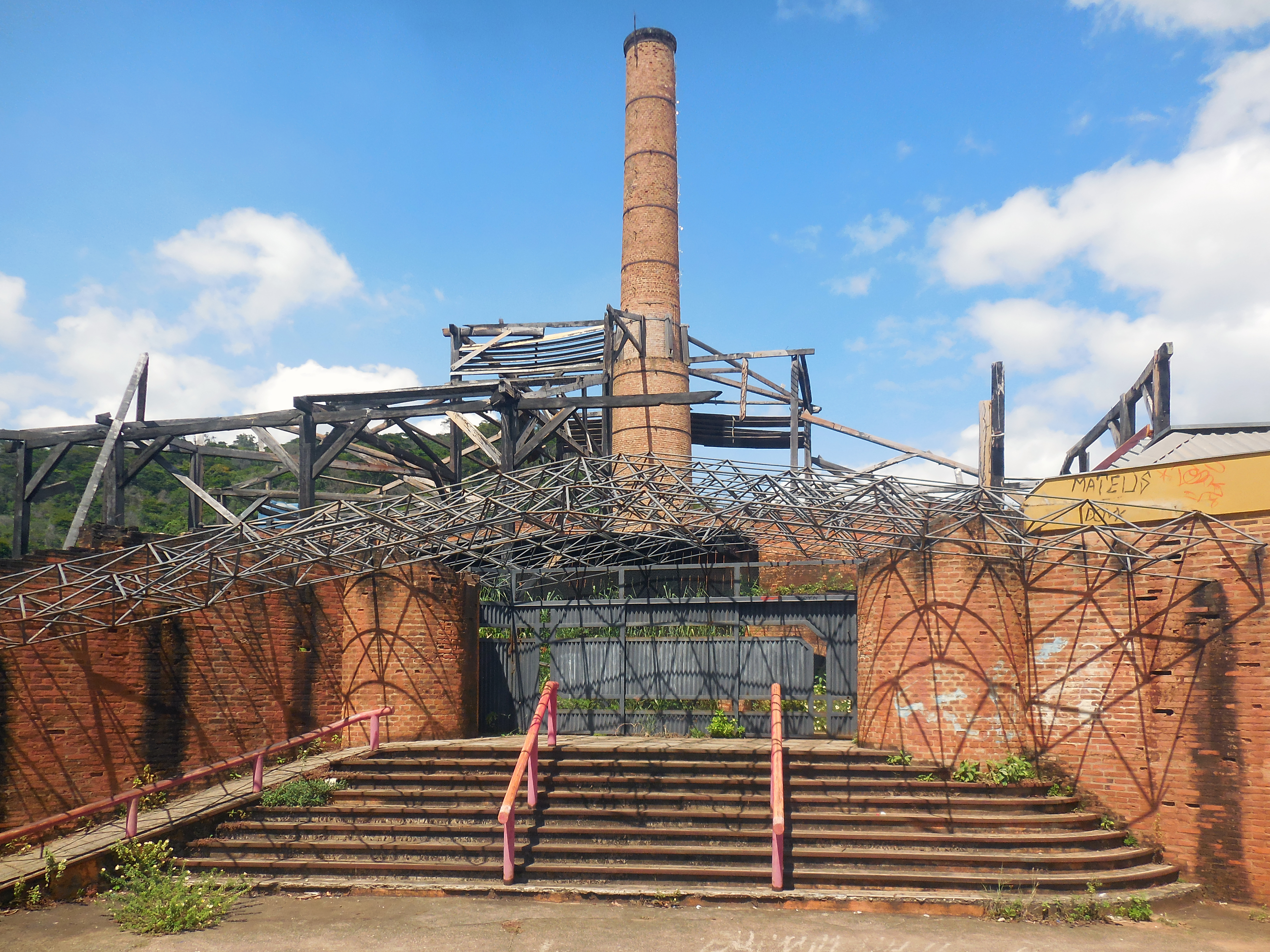
Entrance to the Hoffmann Kiln in the Novo Horizonte neighborhood (photo from 2017).

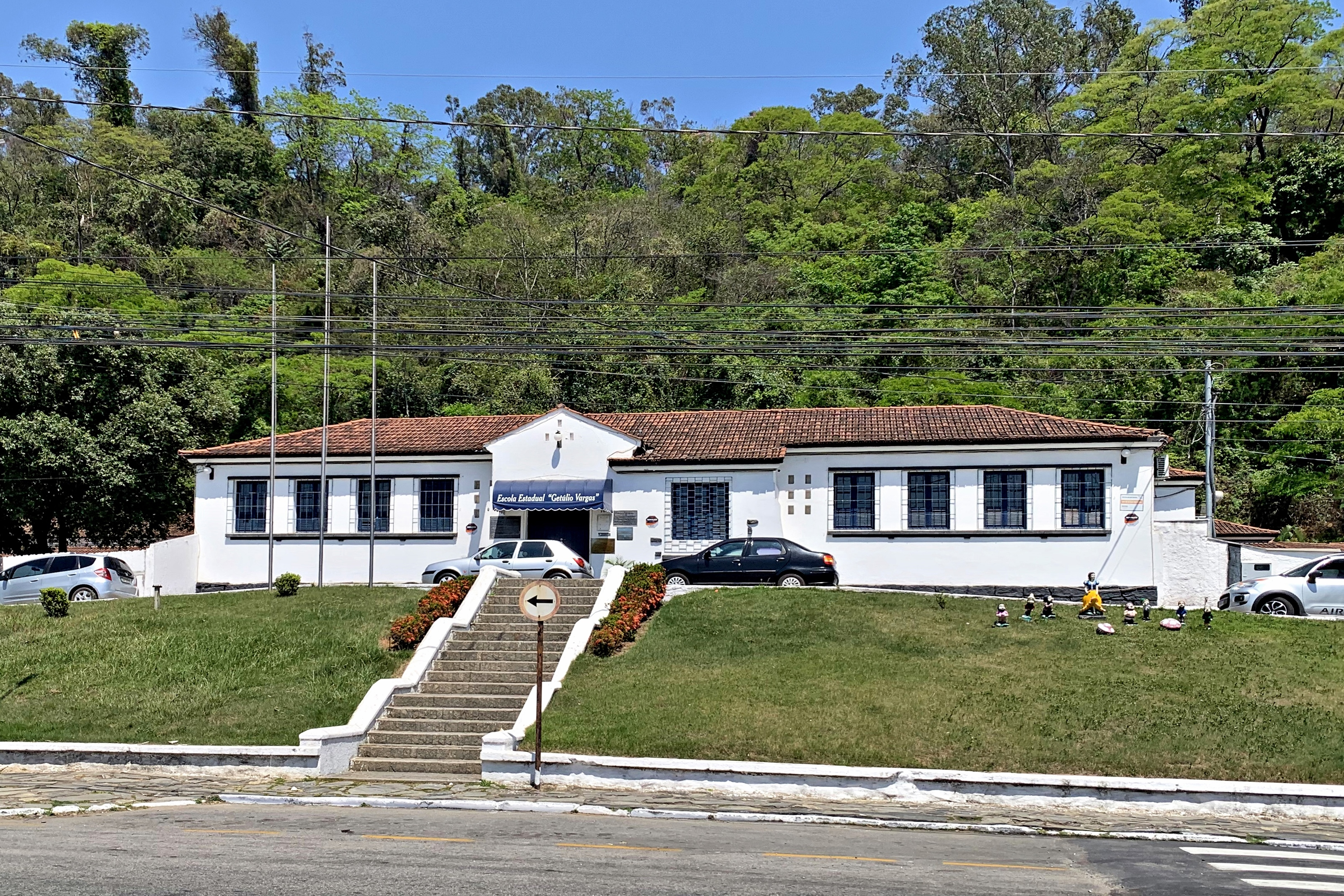
Getúlio Vargas State School, listed as municipal cultural heritage, in the Funcionários neighborhood.

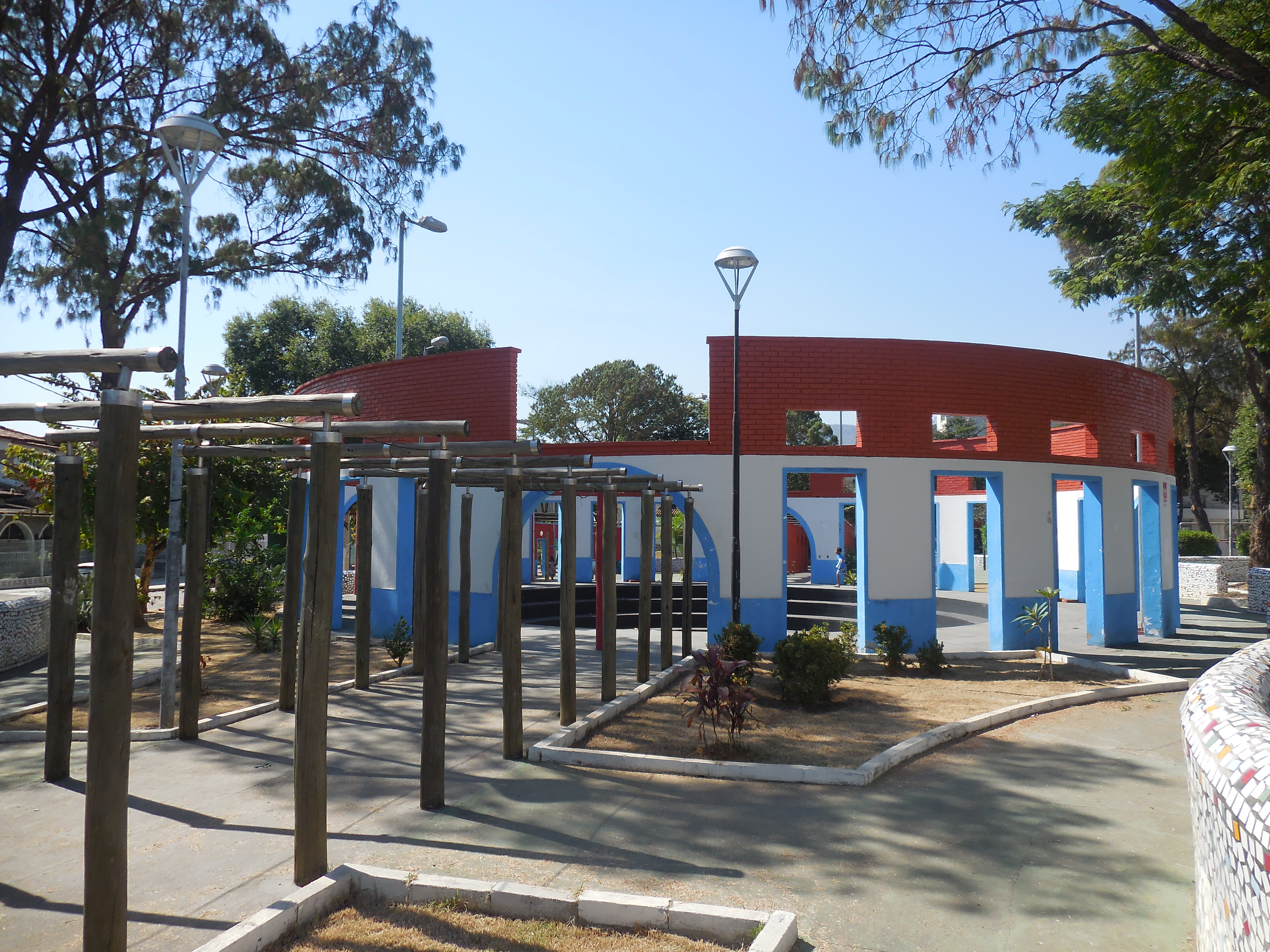
Praça do Coliseu, designed by architect Éolo Maia, in Timirim.

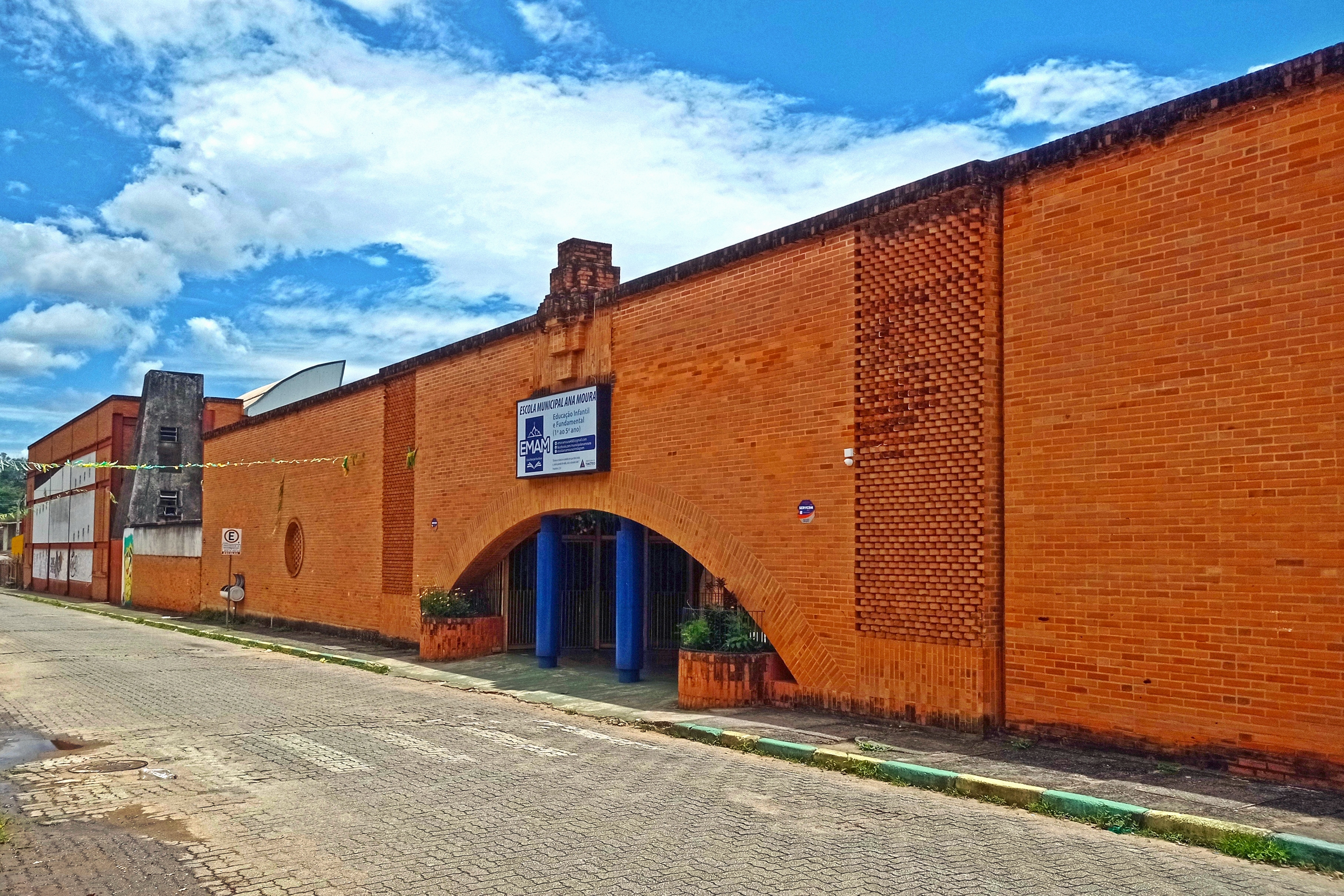
Building of the former Percival Farquhar State School in Vale Verde, another Éolo Maia project.

=== Sports ===
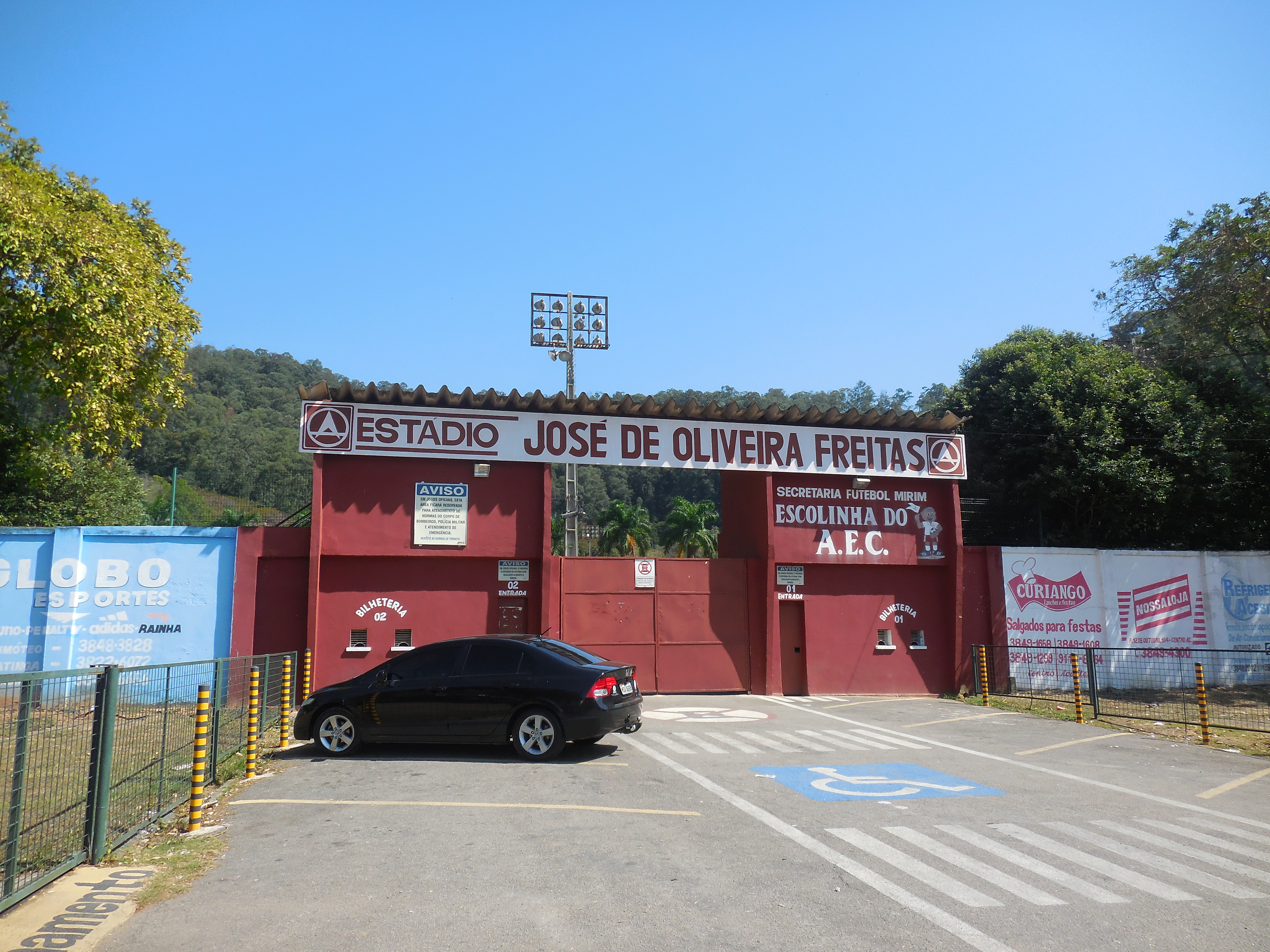
Entrance to José de Oliveira Freitas Stadium in João XXIII, home of Acesita Esporte Clube.

Timóteo offers a range of spaces and facilities for sports, including clubs, football fields, and gyms, but football received the earliest support due to its popularity. The Florestino Social Club, founded in Centro-Sul on 12 October 1938, was the first football club in the current municipality. However, the former Acesita company organized the first tournaments and established the Acesita Esporte Clube in the 1940s to provide leisure for its workers, encouraging the creation of new teams.

Teams formed until the 1960s received support from Acesita to sustain themselves, but Acesita Esporte Clube was the municipality’s most successful team. It competed in professional Minas Gerais championships and holds multiple titles in the main amateur municipal leagues. During this period, the company expanded investments in other sports, hosting tournaments and building the Acesita Esporte Clube’s social headquarters and the ALFA (Acesita Employees’ Leisure Association) sports complex, completed in the 1980s. However, ALFA was deactivated, and its area was sold in 2019. Since the 1950s, the Elite Club and Workers’ Club existed, but the Elite Club focused on dances and events, while the Workers’ Club, aimed at lower-income workers, prioritized sports. Investments in public squares and sports centers were also intensified by the municipal government after emancipation.

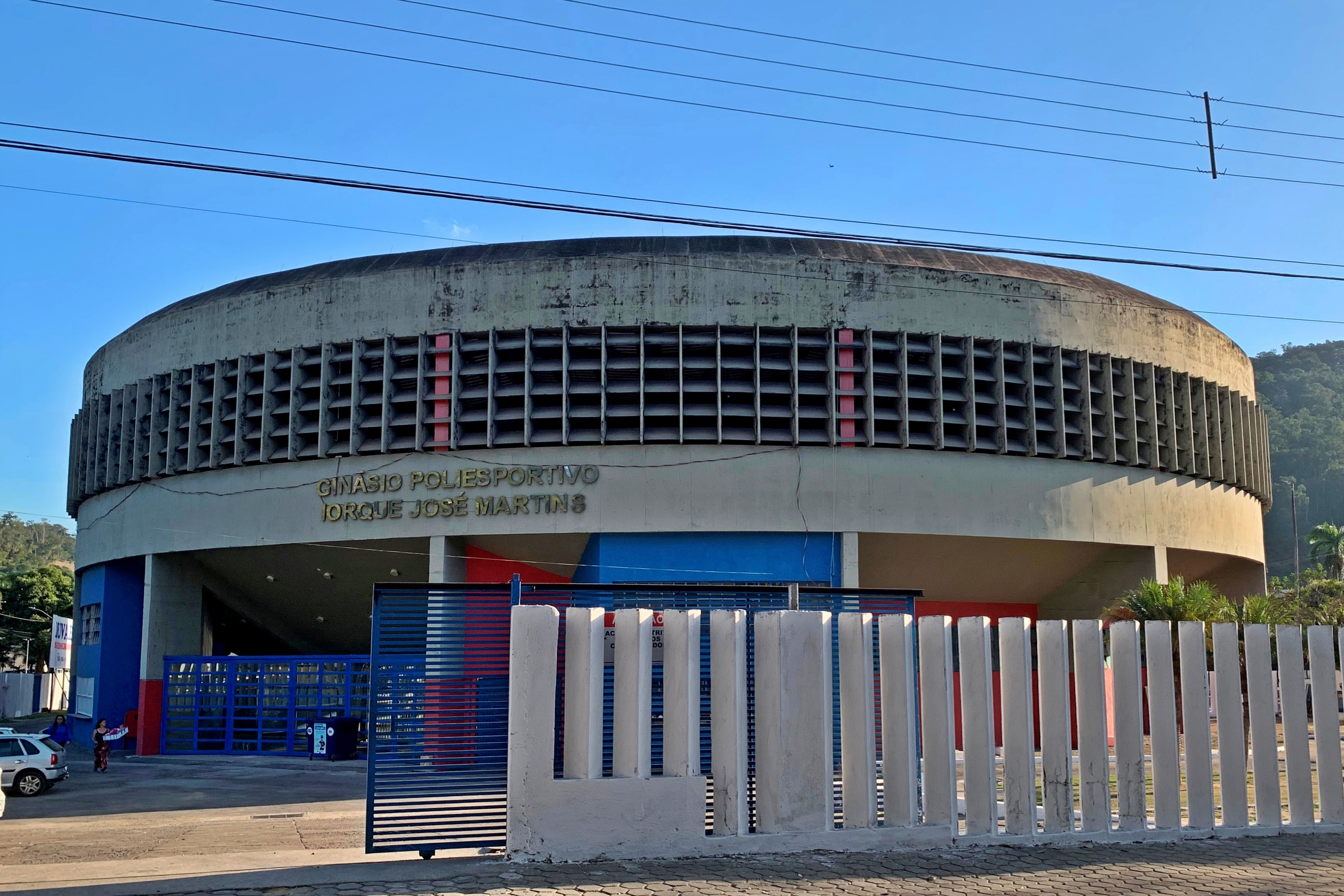
Iorque José Martins Gymnasium

The headquarters of the Acesita Esporte Clube, known as Clube Campestre, features swimming pools, courts for basketball, volleyball, futsal, and tennis, as well as the José de Oliveira Freitas Stadium, nicknamed Jucão. In addition to recreational facilities, the club offers courses in some of these sports and operates the Acesita football school. Other football stadiums in the city include Joaquim Cirilo, the Vila Nova field in the Quitandinha neighborhood; and the General Ney Futuro Rocha Stadium in the São Cristóvão neighborhood. The Iorque José Martins Gymnasium, inaugurated in 1986 and reopened in June 2016 after being closed due to hydraulic issues in 2000, provides multi-sport courts, a sand court, and a walking track. The government runs programs to encourage children and teenagers to participate in sports. There are also championships involving public and private schools that compete against each other in various sports.

=== Holidays and symbols ===
In Timóteo, there are three municipal holidays and eight national holidays, in addition to optional holidays. The municipal holidays are the city’s anniversary, celebrated on 29 April; Corpus Christi, which in 2025 is observed on 19 June; and the Assumption of Our Lady, on 15 August.

The municipality also has official symbols, namely the flag and the coat of arms. These were designed by João Pinto, a draftsman from the former Acesita company, and were officially adopted by Law No. 179 on 22 January 1968. The flag consists of the municipal coat of arms centered on a blue, white, and red rectangle. The coat of arms, in turn, features three stars symbolizing the Executive, Legislative, and Judicial branches. The triangle represents the balance between these branches; the Olympic flame symbolizes commerce; and the gear and anvil represent industry.

== Notable people ==
- Vitor Roque, football player

== See also ==
- List of municipalities in Minas Gerais
