= Santana do Paraíso =

- Municipality
- Municipality of Santana do Paraíso
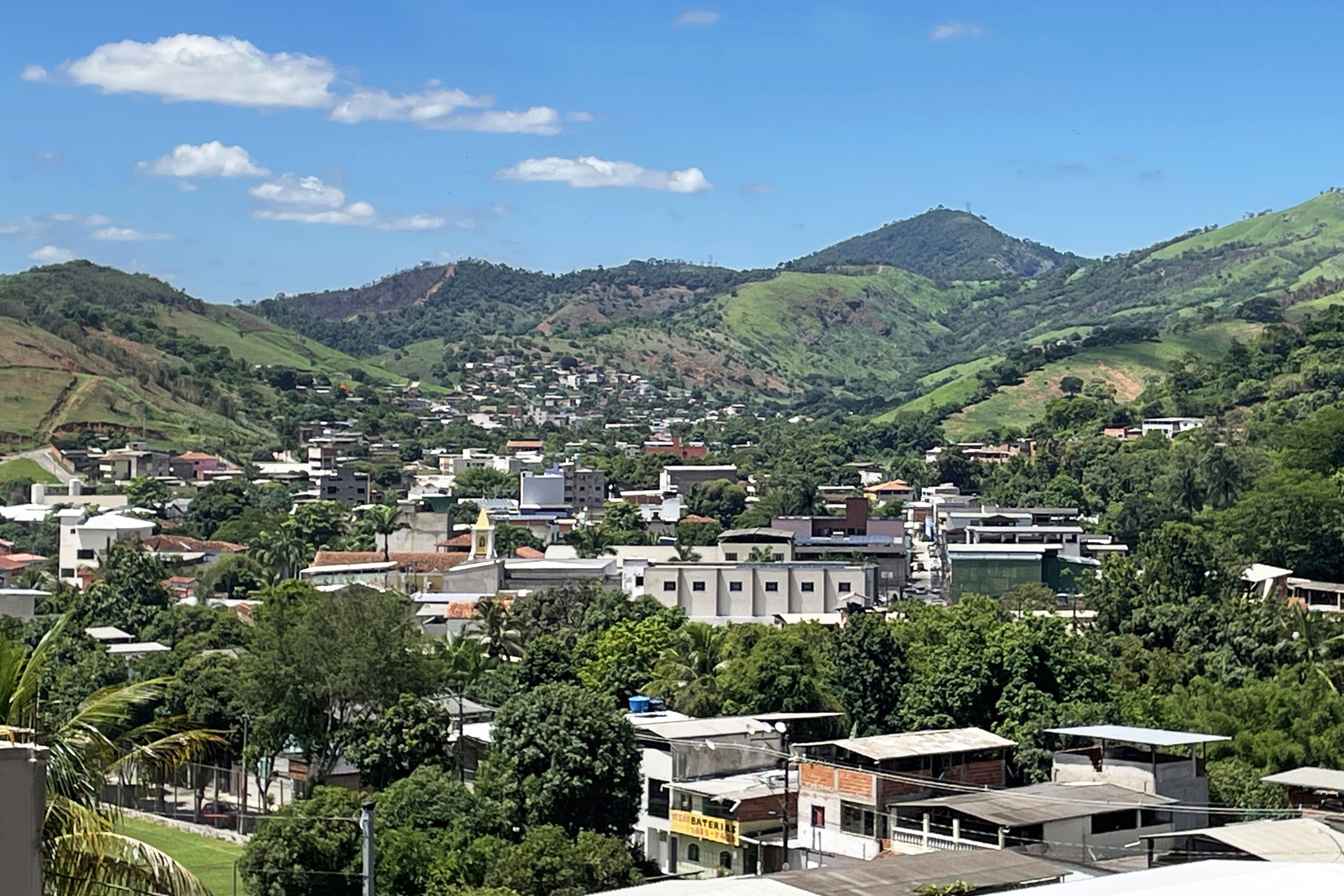
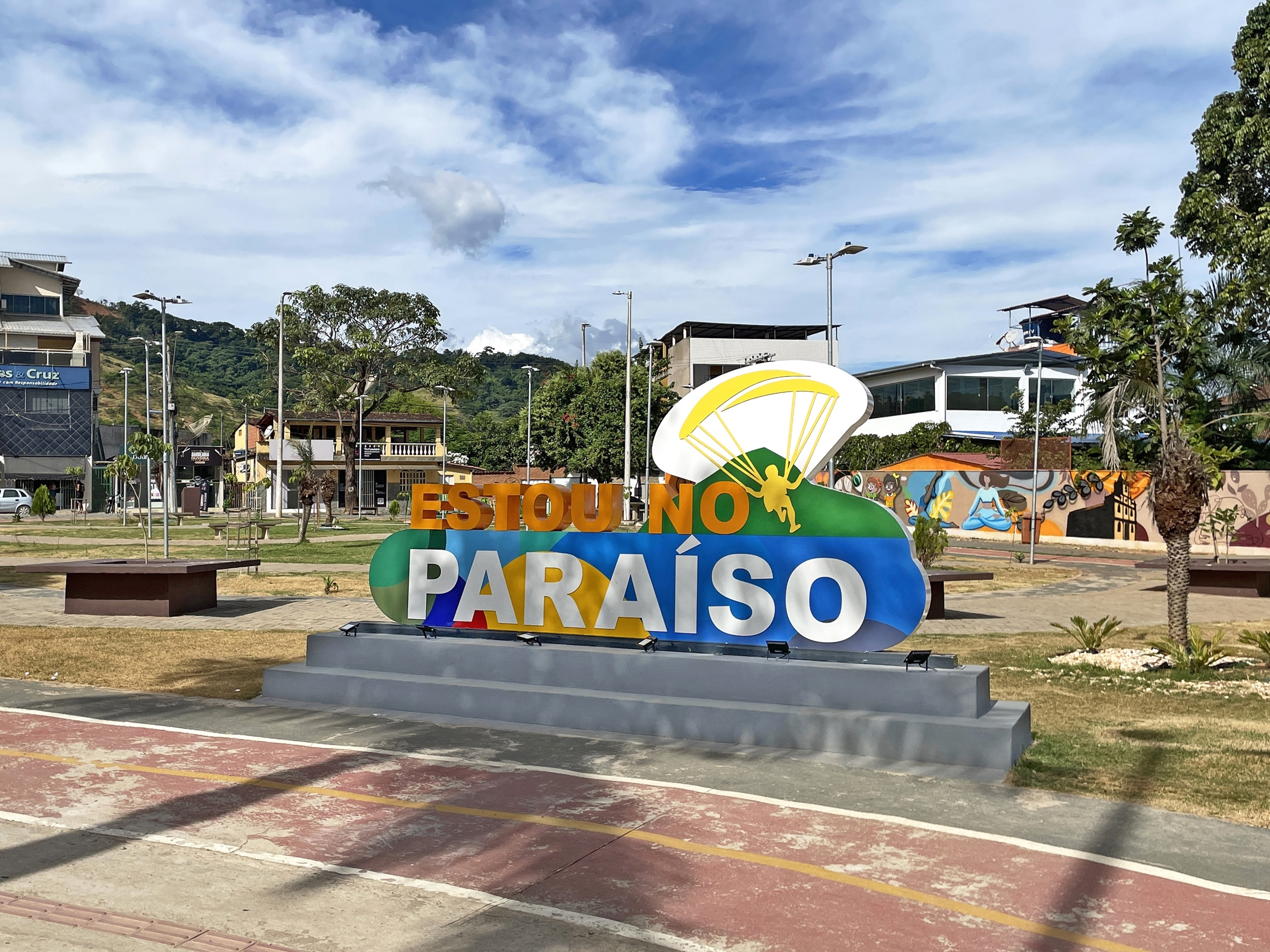
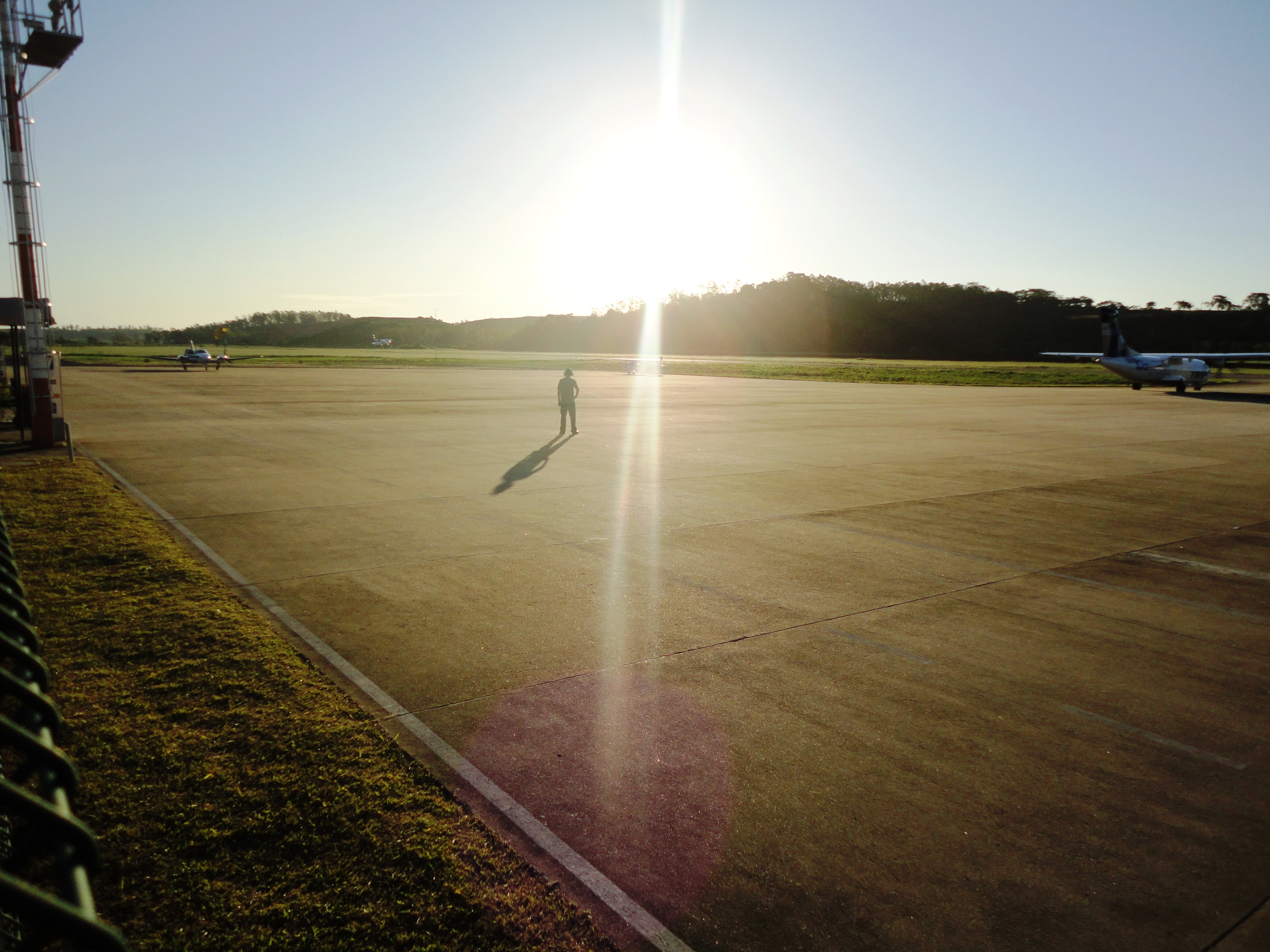
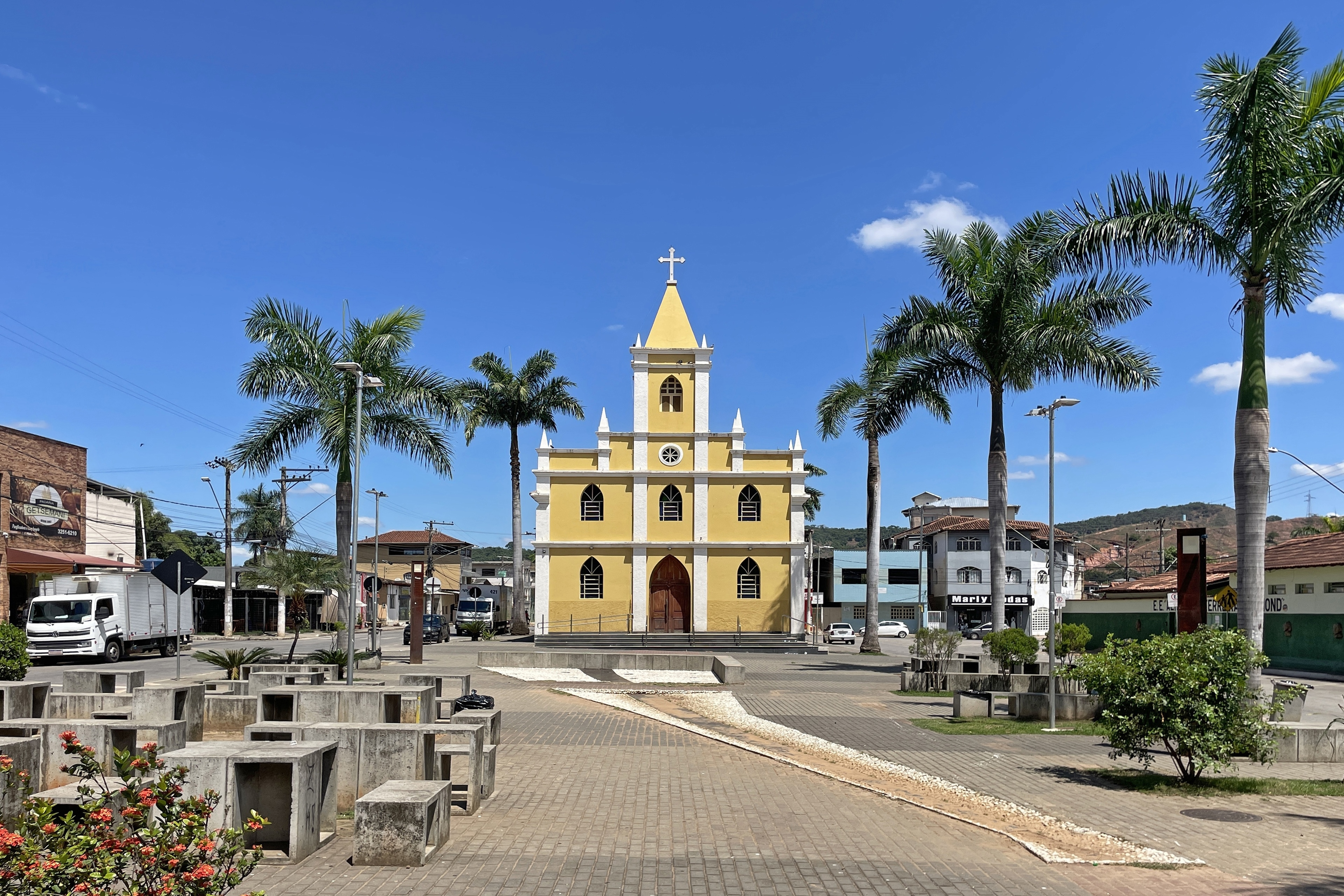
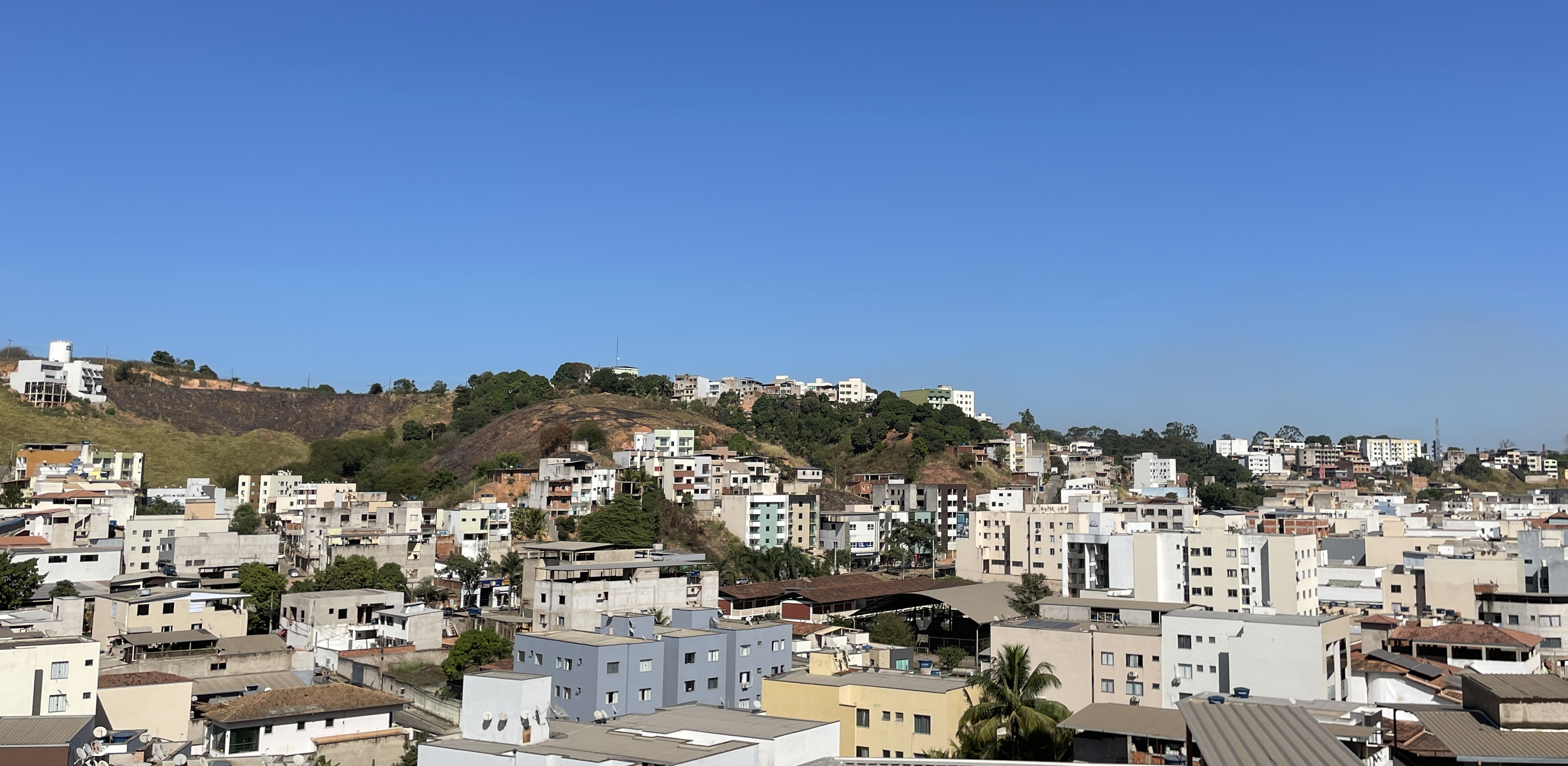
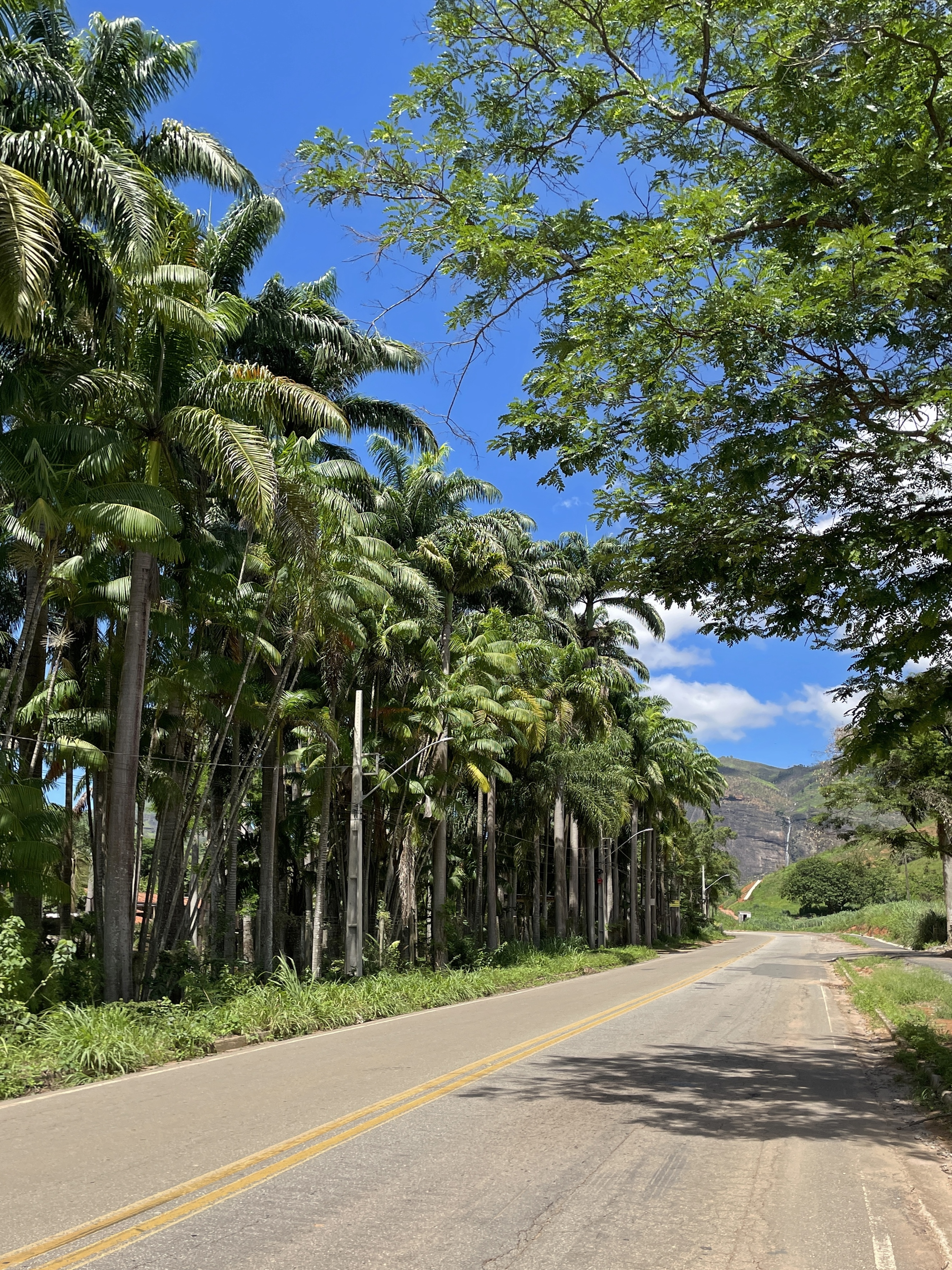
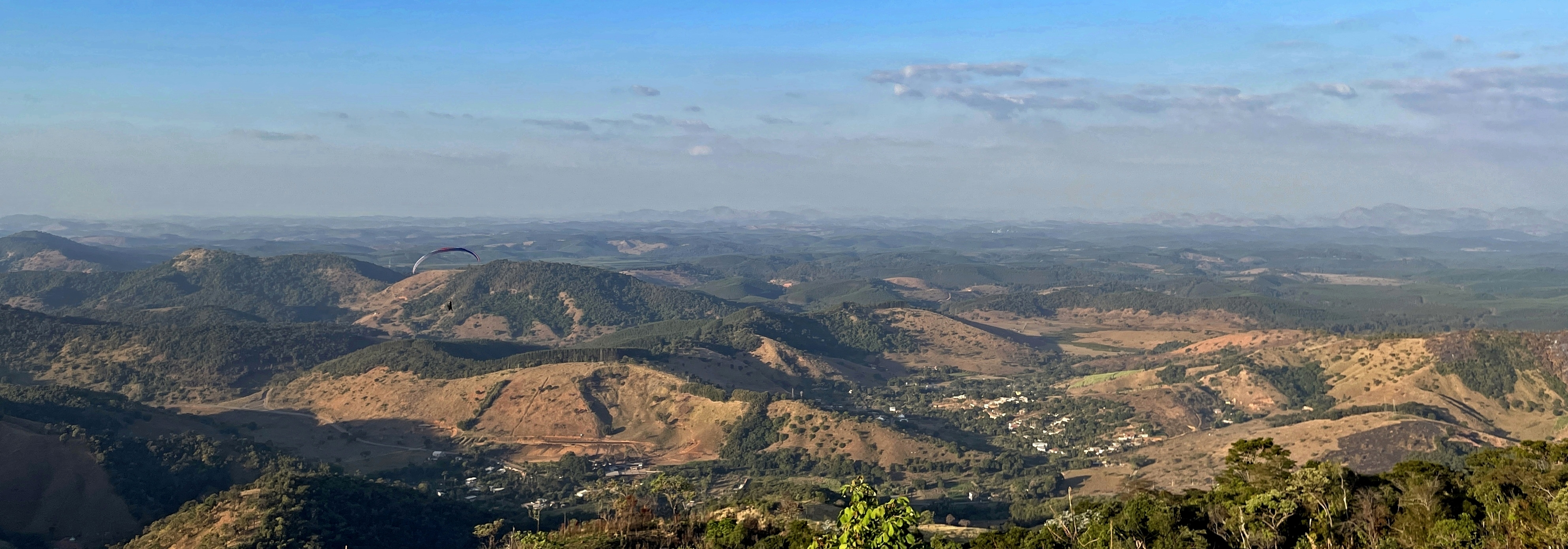
- From top to bottom and left to right: partial view of Santana do Paraíso's downtown from the Alto Santana neighborhood; "I'm in Paradise" sign at Dona Maria do Carmo Events Square; sunset at the Vale do Aço Regional Airport; Matriz Square and Santana Mother Church; view of the Cidade Nova neighborhood; section of MG-232 with Pedra dos Tancredos waterfall in the background; and a panoramic view from Serra da Viúva.
- Anthem: Anthem of the municipality of Santana do Paraíso
- Location of Santana do Paraíso

- Location within Brazil
- Coordinates: 19°21′50″S 42°34′08″W
- Country: Brazil
- Region: Southeast
- State: Minas Gerais
- Metropolitan region: Vale do Aço
- Neighboring municipalities: West: Mesquita; North: Belo Oriente; East: Ipaba; Southeast: Caratinga; South: Ipatinga.
- Distance to capital: 237 kilometres (147 mi)
- Founded: April 28, 1992; 34 years ago

Government
  - Mayor: Bruno Campos Morato (Avante)
  - Term ends: 2028

Area
  - Municipality: 276.067 km^{2} (106.590 sq mi)
  - Urban: 11.02 km^{2} (4.25 sq mi)
- Elevation: 270 m (890 ft)

Population (IBGE Census/2022)
  - Municipality: 44,800
  - Estimate (IBGE/2024): 48,286
  - Density: 162/km^{2} (420/sq mi)
- Demonym: Paraisense
- Time zone: UTC-3 (BRT)
- Postal code: 35179-000 to 35179-999
- Area code: +55 31
- Climate: Tropical savanna climate (Aw)
- HDI (UNDP/2010): 0.685 (medium)
- GDP (IBGE/2021): R$750,462,520
- GDP per capita (IBGE/2021): R$20,818.42
- Website: santanadoparaiso.mg.gov.br

Santana do Paraíso is a Brazilian municipality located in the interior of the state of Minas Gerais, in the Southeast Region of the country. It is situated in the Vale do Rio Doce and is part of the Vale do Aço Metropolitan Region, approximately 240 kilometres (150 mi) east of the state capital. The municipality covers an area of just over 276 square kilometres (107 sq mi), with 11 square kilometres (4.2 sq mi) constituting the urban area, and its population was estimated at 48,286 inhabitants in 2024.

The exploration of the region where the city now stands began in the 19th century, through expeditions ordered by John VI of Portugal aimed at occupying the area, which became feasible only after the evangelization of local indigenous peoples by Guido Marlière after 1819. Marlière also facilitated the construction of roads, later used by tropeiros. Near the present-day city center, at Cachoeira do Engenho Velho, a rest stop was established, which evolved into a farm and commercial hub, around which the settlement known as Taquaraçu formed. This settlement became the district of Santana do Paraíso in 1892.

The area experienced further development due to the influence of industrial complexes in the current Vale do Aço region during the 1940s and 1950s. In 1959, it was selected as the site for the Ipatinga Airport, which remains the only airport in the region. Its proximity to Ipatinga, the headquarters of Usiminas, spurred urban growth and the formation of a new urban nucleus in a conurbation with the neighboring city, parallel to the original district seat. With its status as a dormitory city and recent industrial investments within its territory, emancipation occurred in 1992. The sustained industrial activity in the region contributed to the establishment of the Vale do Aço Metropolitan Region, one of the main urban centers in the state's interior.

Beyond its economic and demographic significance, the municipality is home to numerous trails, forests, lagoons, and waterfalls open to visitors. A key landmark in the city is the Santana Mother Church, maintained by the local parish. Cultural expressions include a congado group, handicrafts, and festive events such as the city’s anniversary celebrations, the Feast of the Divine, and the day of Saint Anne, the municipal patron saint.

== History ==
=== Colonization of the region ===
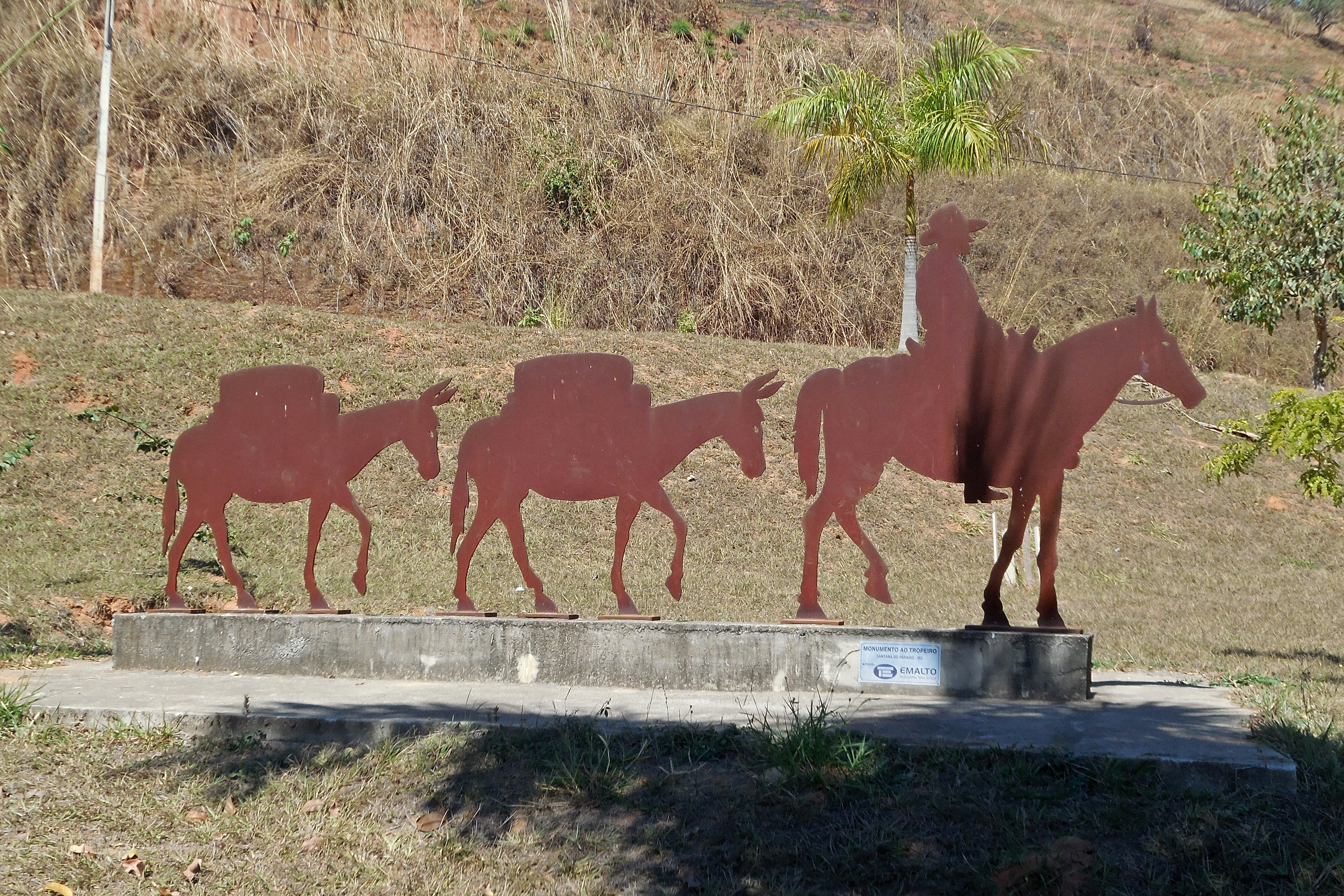
Tropeiro Monument on MG-232

The area of present-day Santana do Paraíso saw little significant colonization until the mid-19th century, except for the presence of Nack-ne-nuck, descendants of the Botocudos. Expeditions in search of precious metals also reached the areas near the Doce River, but exploration only began after 1809, under orders from John VI of Portugal, who sought to civilize the indigenous peoples of the Vale do Rio Doce. Consequently, the lands were transferred to Antônio Rodrigues Taborda, who led the occupation efforts. However, resistance from the natives, dense forests, and the prevalence of tropical diseases hindered exploration.

In 1819, Frenchman Guido Marlière was appointed administrator of the Doce River region, achieving pacification of the indigenous peoples and opening roads, many of which were later used by tropeiros. One such road, connecting Antônio Dias and Coronel Fabriciano to Ferros, passed by Cachoeira do Engenho Velho, near the current center of Santana do Paraíso, where a rest stop was established. This place became known as Taquaraçu, meaning "large bamboo," and evolved into a reference point and commercial center, marking the beginning of a settlement.

=== Population and economic expansion ===
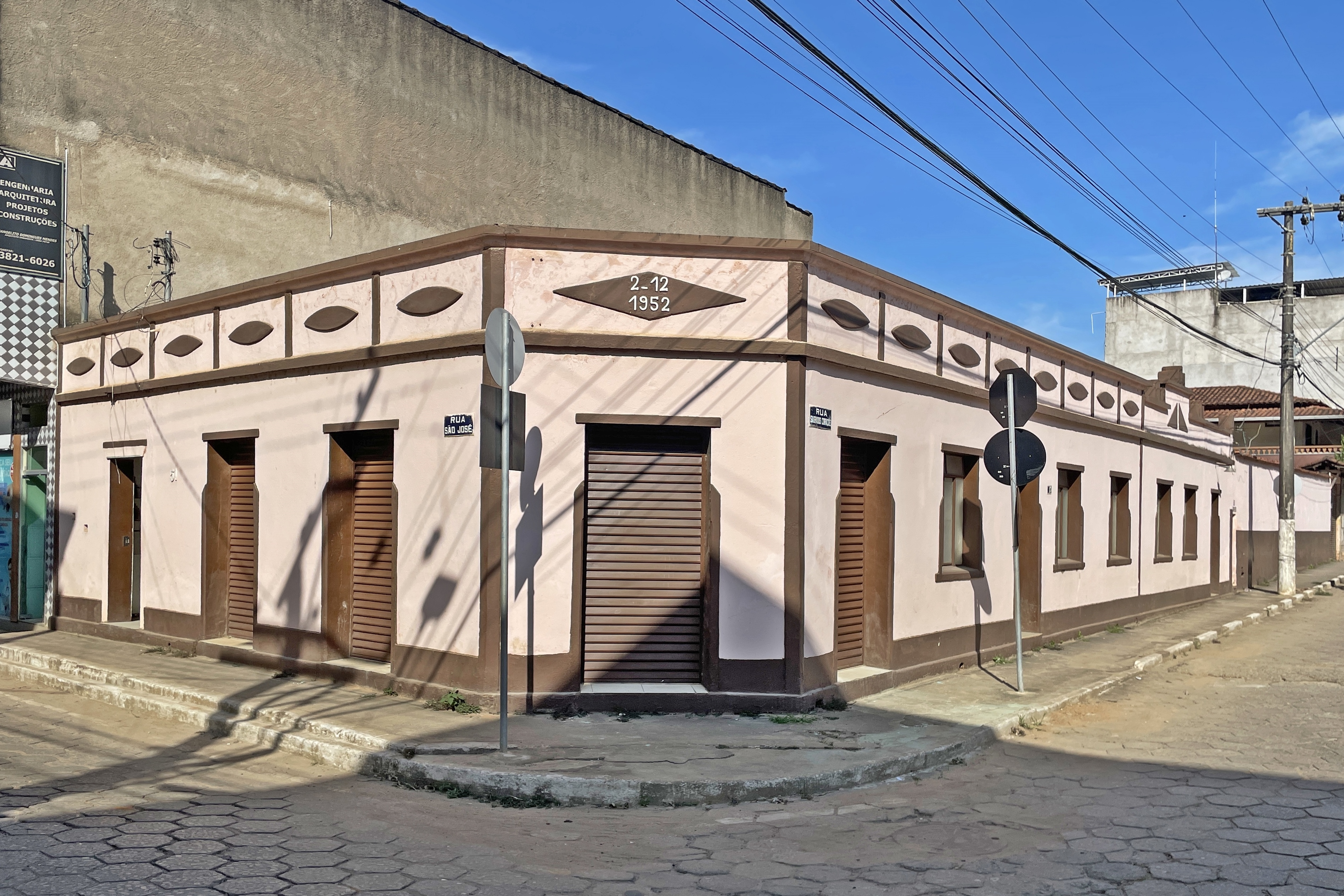
Building with the inscription "1952" in downtown Santana do Paraíso

The first commercial hub in Taquaraçu was the Cachoeira do Engenho Farm, which over time was equipped with a mill, coffee and rice cleaning machines, and grain warehouses. The fertile land, abundant game, and numerous watercourses suitable for fishing attracted new residents. Expeditions followed the course of the Achado Stream and its tributaries around 1845 to explore local lands. On August 16, 1885, a group of residents donated land in the name of Saint Anne, intended for housing the poor. On the same occasion, the first church of the settlement, dedicated to Saint Vincent, was consecrated.

Due to the settlement’s growth, municipal law no. 26, dated November 16, 1892, established the district, named Ipanema and subordinated to Itabira. Under state law no. 556, dated August 30, 1911, the district was renamed Santana do Paraíso and transferred to Ferros, but it was later reassigned to the municipality of Mesquita by state law no. 843, dated September 7, 1923. The name "Santana do Paraíso" references the patron saint Saint Anne and the natural attractions, reminiscent of a "paradise". The area saw further development influenced by the establishment of Acesita in Timóteo in the 1940s and Usiminas in Ipatinga in the 1950s.

The proximity of Santana do Paraíso to the so-called Vale do Aço, combined with easy access to Ipatinga via MG-232, facilitated the expansion of the original district’s urban core. Meanwhile, a new development zone emerged in another part of the municipal territory, near the border with Ipatinga, intersected by BR-381 and BR-458. Along these highways, numerous subdivisions were established, particularly after the 1980s, driven also by the construction of the Ipatinga Airport in Santana do Paraíso territory in 1959, near BR-381. With the creation of these new neighborhoods, a conurbation with Ipatinga’s urban area emerged, parallel to the original seat of Santana do Paraíso, integrating the municipality into the Vale do Aço urban agglomeration.

=== Emancipation and the 21st century ===
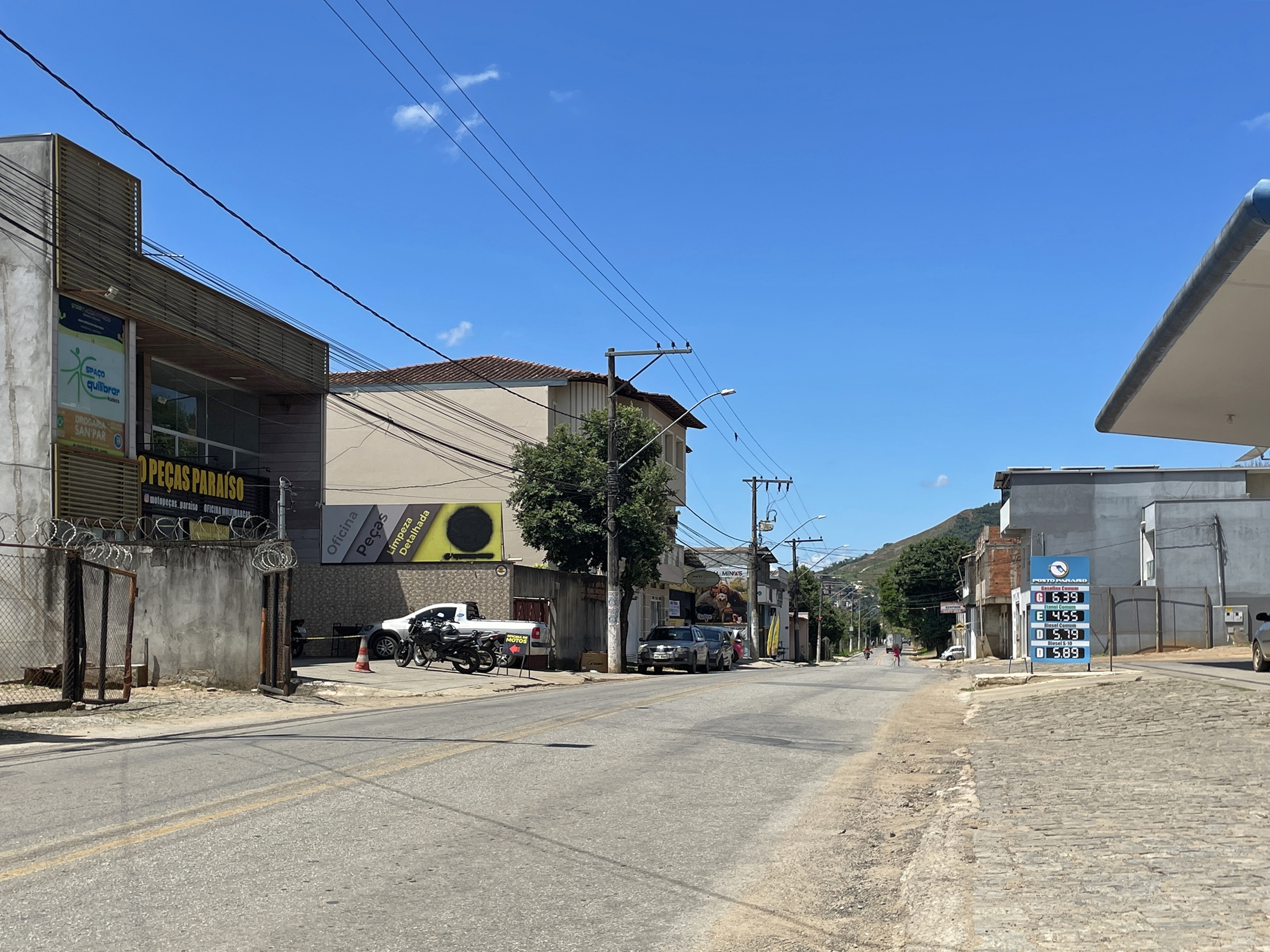
Minas Gerais Avenue (MG-232) in the Veraneio neighborhood

Due to its border with Ipatinga’s urban perimeter and easy access to it, Santana do Paraíso recorded the highest population growth rates in the Vale do Aço between the 1990s and 2000s. The establishment of an industrial district in the Ipatinga Airport region also encouraged the settlement of companies within the municipal territory. This development led to emancipation through state law No. 10,704, dated April 27, 1992, and published on April 28, 1992, which came into effect on January 1, 1993. In areas previously used for agriculture and livestock, there was a gradual shift to eucalyptus cultivation to supply the pulp mills of Cenibra in Belo Oriente, with reforestation areas covering over 40% of Santana do Paraíso territory by the early 2010s.

As a dormitory city close to Usiminas, the municipality received investments and revenues from the company, such as airport operations and the construction of an industrial landfill alongside the sanitary landfill of the Vale do Aço Waste Center (CRVA), inaugurated in 2003. In the 2000s, there was a plan to build an industrial unit in the municipality, but the project was halted due to the 2008–2012 financial crisis.

Alongside the municipality’s economic growth, the conurbation with the Vale do Aço agglomeration, whether related to local companies or not, led to disorganized occupations, deforestation, and precarious subdivisions since the 1990s, particularly in the city’s periphery. Given the sudden population increase and relatively recent emancipation, Santana do Paraíso lacked sufficient resources and infrastructure to implement necessary public policies. Thus, the municipality’s urban growth was not matched by socioeconomic development capable of meeting the population’s needs.

== Geography ==
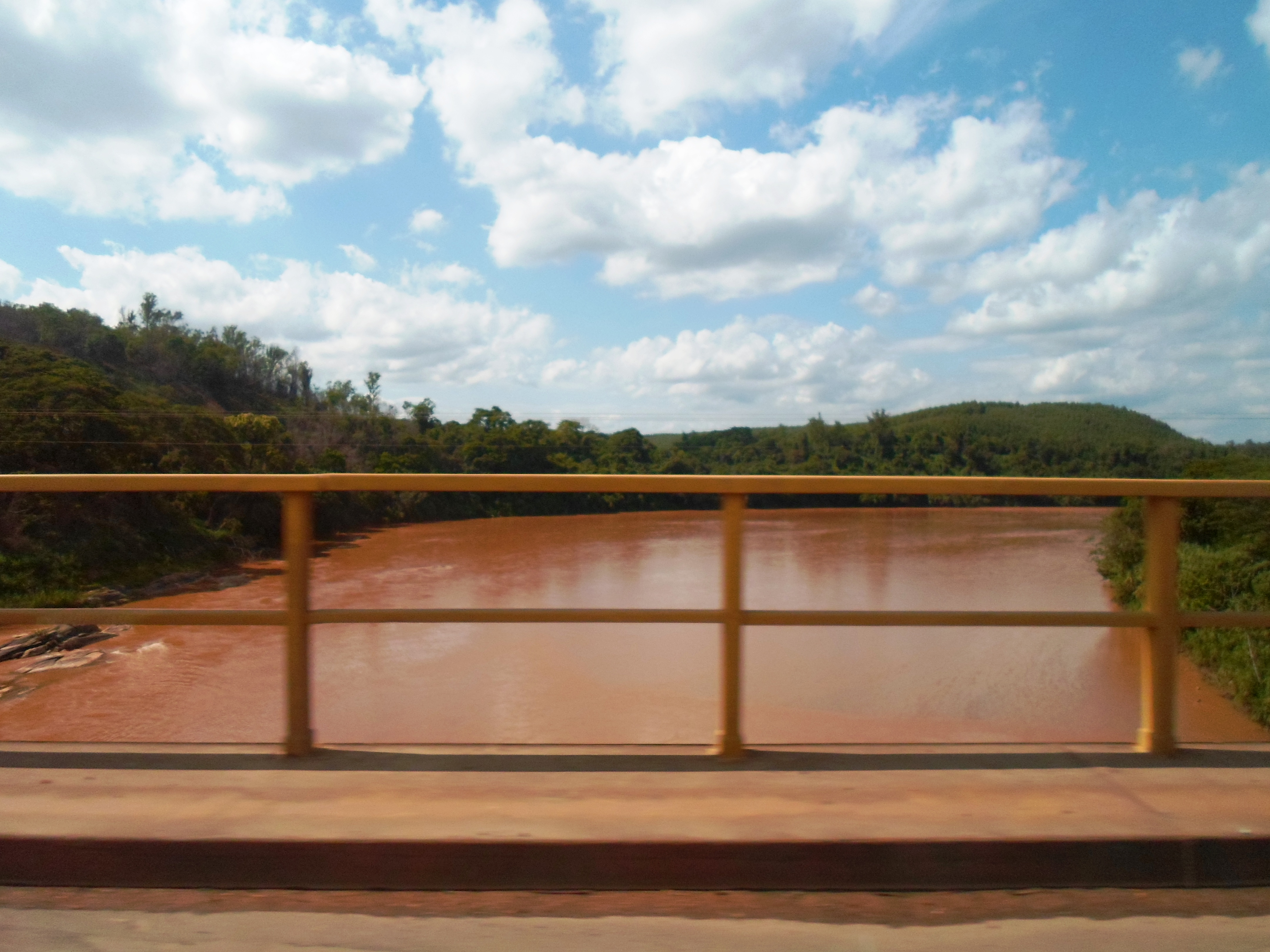
Doce River at the Metallic Bridge, between Caratinga and Santana do Paraíso.

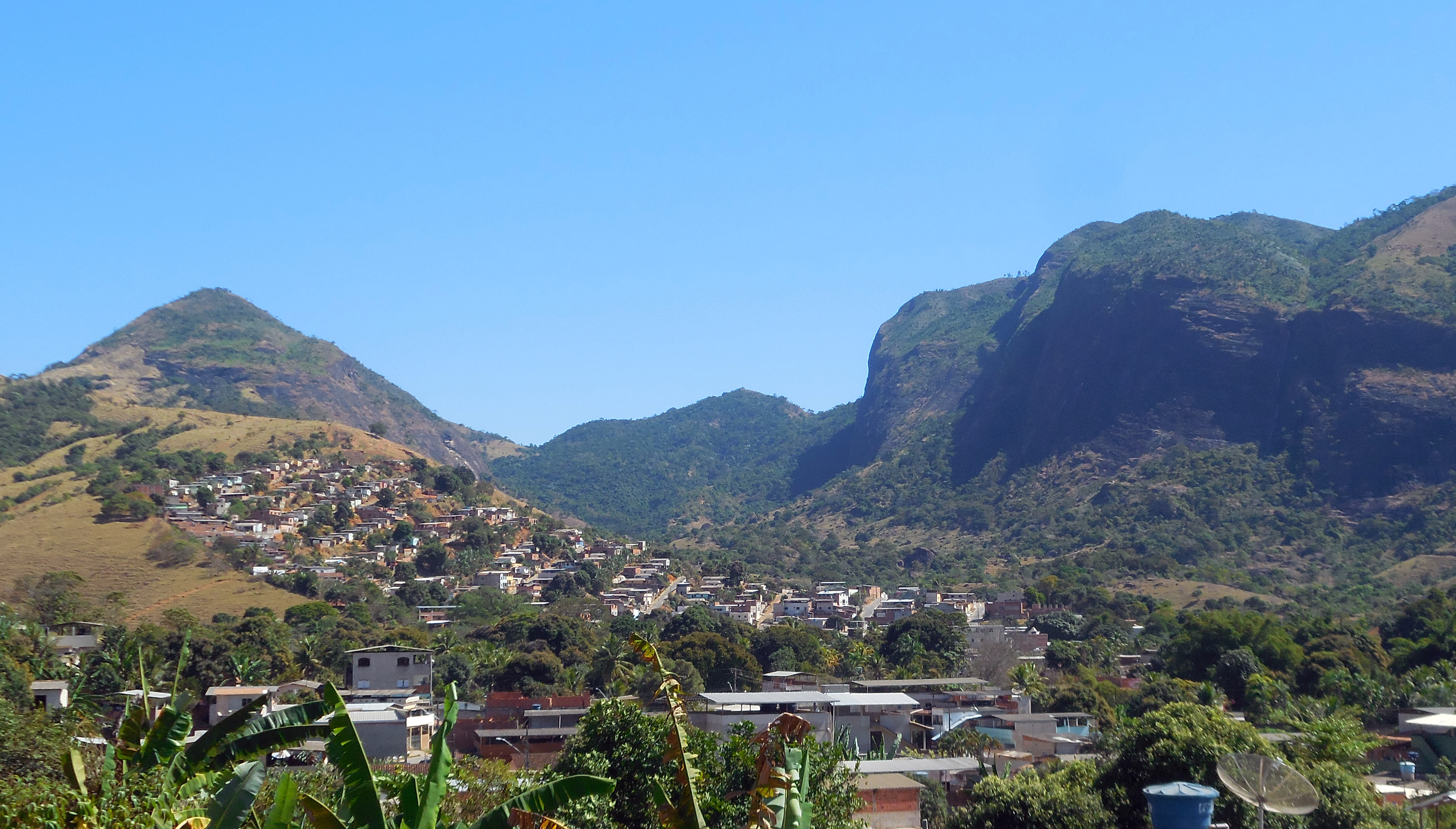
Residencial Paraíso neighborhood with rocky formations in the background

The municipality’s area is 276.067 square kilometres (106.590 sq mi), representing 0.1713% of Minas Gerais, 0.1087% of the Southeast Region, and 0.0118% of the entire Brazilian territory. Of this total, 11.02 square kilometres (4.25 sq mi) constitutes the urban zone. According to the regional division in effect since 2017, established by the IBGE, the municipality belongs to the Intermediate and Immediate Geographic Regions of Ipatinga. Previously, under the division into microregions and mesoregions, it was part of the Ipatinga microregion, included in the Vale do Rio Doce mesoregion.

=== Topography and hydrography ===
The landscape's composition is the result of fluvial erosion and its action on Precambrian granite-gneiss rocks. Average altitudes range from 200 meters in the south, near the Doce River course; to 850 meters in the Serra do Achado region in the northwest, reaching up to 1,100 metres (3,600 ft) at the source of the Achado Stream. The city center is situated at 300 meters altitude. The southern areas feature plains and slightly undulating terrain, while the northwest, nearing the Serra do Achado, becomes markedly rugged. Santana do Paraíso lies within the Doce River basin, which separates the municipality from the territories of Caratinga and Ipaba. The municipal territory encompasses four main sub-basins, all draining into the Doce River: the Bueiro Stream and Entre Folhas Stream, and the Achado Stream (144.4 square kilometres (55.8 sq mi)) and Garrafa Stream (45.7 square kilometres (17.6 sq mi)). Only the latter two cover parts of the urban perimeter. The Achado Stream originates in a rugged area and, besides being home to hundreds of other springs in its sub-basin, features several waterfalls along its course. This stream is a tributary of the Taquaraçu Stream, another significant watercourse in the municipality’s rural zone, which flows into the Doce River.

=== Neighboring municipalities and metropolitan region ===
Santana do Paraíso borders the municipalities of Belo Oriente to the north, Ipaba to the east, Caratinga to the southeast, Ipatinga to the south, and Mesquita to the west. The region’s rapid growth has blurred political boundaries, forming the Vale do Aço Metropolitan Region (RMVA), which includes Santana do Paraíso alongside the cities of Coronel Fabriciano, Ipatinga, and Timóteo, plus 24 other municipalities in the so-called metropolitan belt. As mentioned, Santana do Paraíso serves as a dormitory city for the RMVA while being home to the region’s only airport and offering the most land suitable for urban expansion. The region gained international recognition because of the major companies that are based there, such as Cenibra (in Belo Oriente), Aperam South America (in Timóteo), and Usiminas (Ipatinga), all with significant export volumes. Despite its recent settlement, it is one of the state’s key inland urban hubs.

=== Climate ===
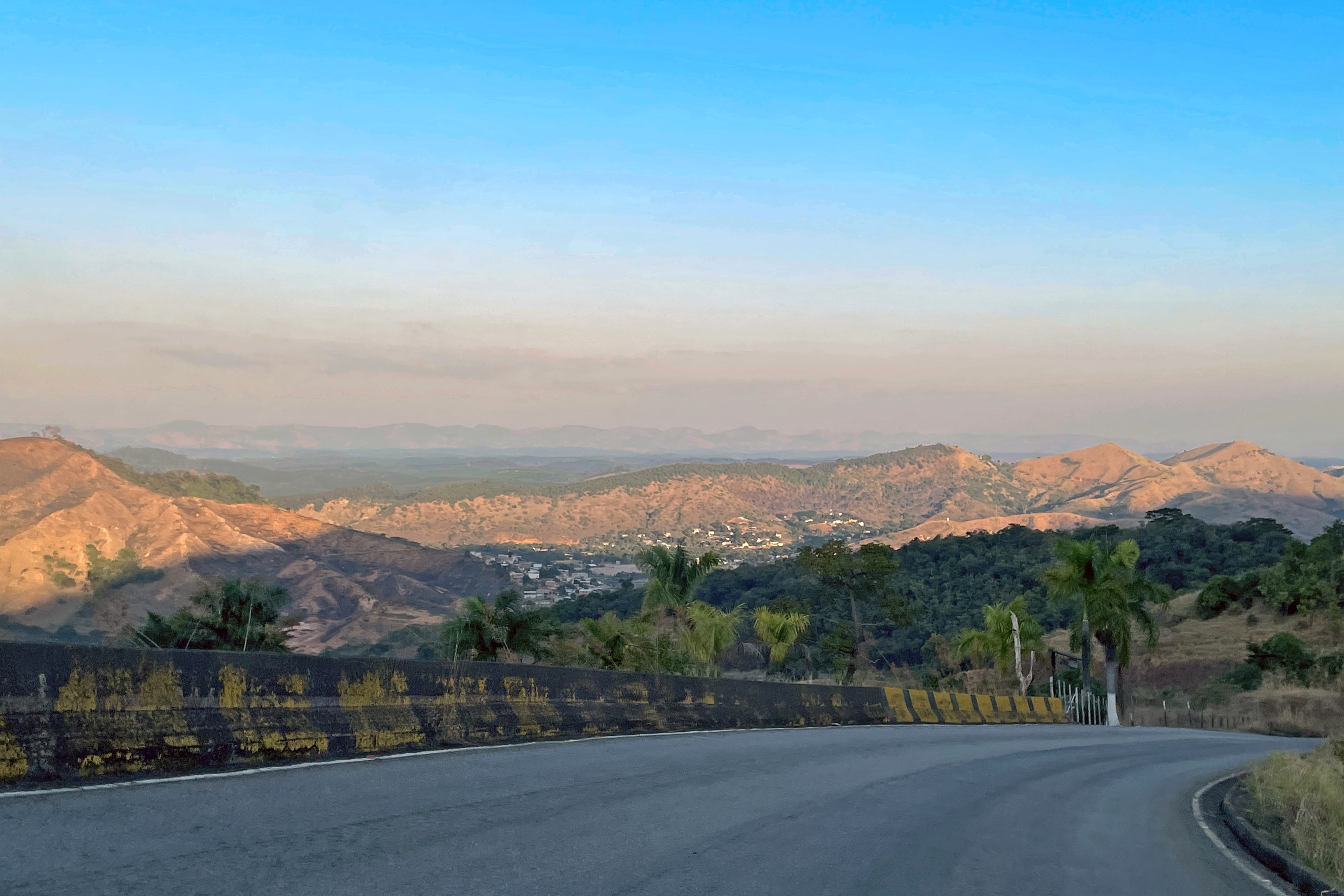
Partial view of the city from the Serra da Viúva road during a winter sunset

Santana do Paraíso has a tropical savanna climate (type Aw according to the Köppen classification), with an average annual temperature of 24 °C (75 °F) and average rainfall of 1,150 millimetres (45 in) per year, concentrated between October and April. The wet season comprises the hotter months, while the dry season covers milder months. Autumn and spring serve as transitional seasons. The transition between dry and wet periods is marked by thunderstorms and high thermal amplitude, especially from late winter to spring.

Precipitation primarily falls as rain, occasionally as hail, and may be accompanied by lightnings and strong gusts. According to the Atmospheric Electricity Group of the National Institute for Space Research (ELAT/INPE) in 2018, the municipality has a lightning density of 2.007 strikes per km²/year, ranking 513th in the state and 3,966th nationally. Fog occurs with high humidity and low temperatures. However, low humidity levels may occur during the dry season or prolonged Indian summers. During these periods, dry air combined with pollution increases pollutant concentration, worsening air quality.

The prevailing wind originates from the east, with the windiest period between August 1 and November 29, averaging 10.7 kilometers per hour, slightly stronger in September and October. During the calmer period from March to June, the average speed ranges between 8 and 9 kilometers per hour. At Ipatinga Airport, extreme temperature records range from 6 °C (6 °C) on May 19, 2022, to 40 °C (40 °C) on October 31, 2012, and November 18, 2023. On October 16, 2015, the minimum relative humidity reached 17%. On the night of January 12, 2025, Santana do Paraíso was hit by a storm with 216 millimetres (8.5 in) of rainfall in a few hours, according to municipal measurements, the highest volume ever recorded in the city. This event caused floods and landslides in several parts of the city, resulting in one fatality.

Climate data for Santana do Paraíso
Month	Jan	Feb	Mar	Apr	May	Jun	Jul	Aug	Sep	Oct	Nov	Dec	Year
Mean daily maximum °C (°F)	31.9 (89.4)	32.5 (90.5)	30.9 (87.6)	30.1 (86.2)	28.4 (83.1)	27.5 (81.5)	27.3 (81.1)	28.6 (83.5)	29.0 (84.2)	29.7 (85.5)	30.0 (86.0)	30.5 (86.9)	29.7 (85.5)
Daily mean °C (°F)	26.1 (79.0)	26.5 (79.7)	25.4 (77.7)	24.3 (75.7)	22.5 (72.5)	21.1 (70.0)	20.8 (69.4)	21.9 (71.4)	23.0 (73.4)	24.2 (75.6)	24.7 (76.5)	25.2 (77.4)	23.8 (74.8)
Mean daily minimum °C (°F)	20.4 (68.7)	20.5 (68.9)	20.0 (68.0)	18.6 (65.5)	16.6 (61.9)	14.7 (58.5)	14.4 (57.9)	15.2 (59.4)	17.0 (62.6)	18.8 (65.8)	19.5 (67.1)	20.0 (68.0)	18.0 (64.4)
Average precipitation mm (inches)	208 (8.2)	115 (4.5)	122 (4.8)	70 (2.8)	29 (1.1)	18 (0.7)	12 (0.5)	15 (0.6)	37 (1.5)	104 (4.1)	206 (8.1)	211 (8.3)	1,147 (45.2)
Source: Climate-Data.org

=== Ecology and environment ===
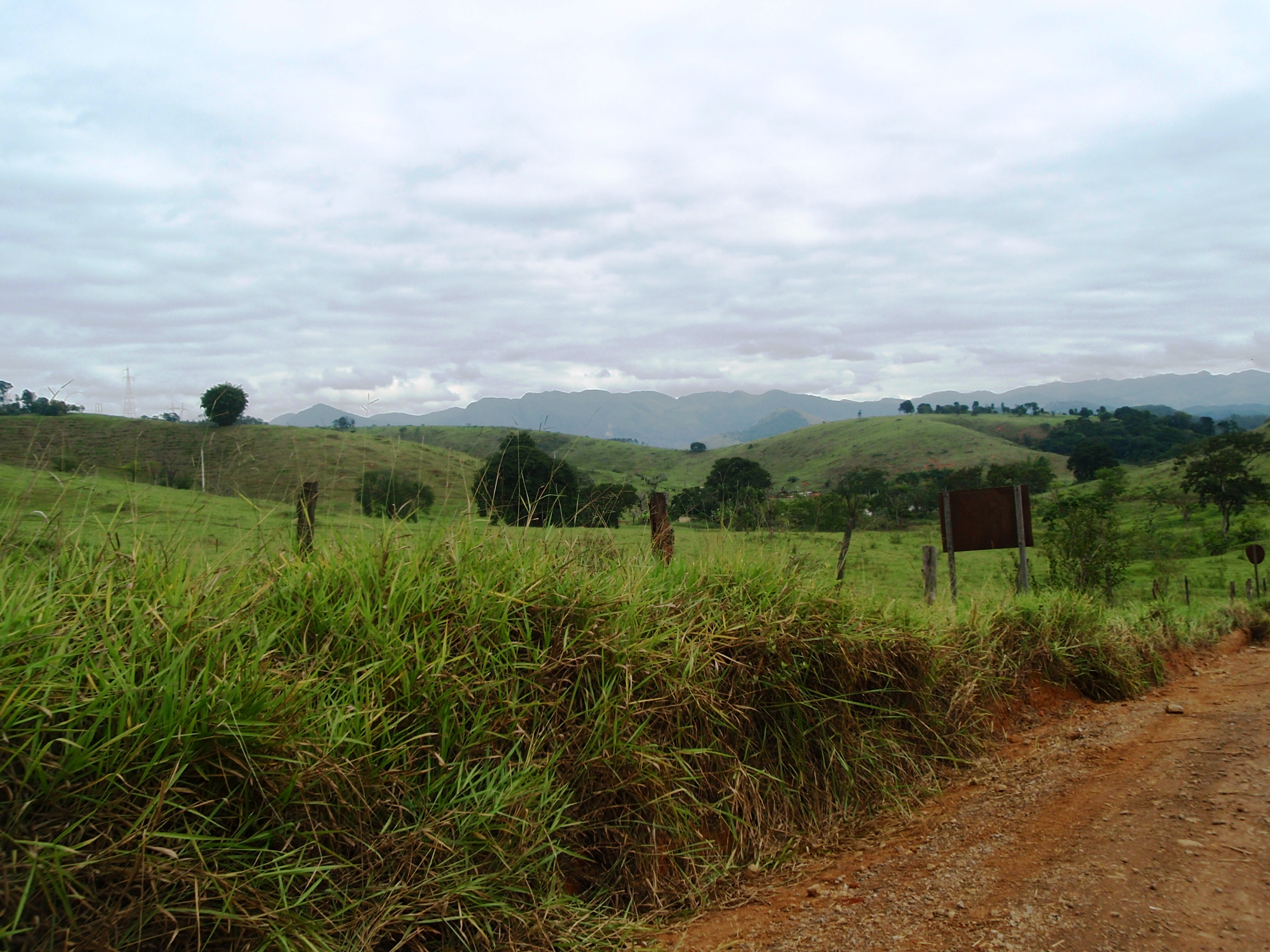
Pastures in the rural zone of Santana do Paraíso

The native vegetation belongs to the Atlantic Forest domain, with few fragmented areas remaining amidst reforested zones, pastures, and the urban perimeter. However, the predominant land use is monoculture reforestation with eucalyptus, covering a larger area than the original biome, aimed at supplying raw material for the Cenibra pulp mill. In 2009, eucalyptus plantations occupied 9,608.59 hectares (23,743.3 acres) or 34.97% of Santana do Paraíso’s territory. That year, 187.36 hectares (463.0 acres) (0.68%) were covered by watercourses, and 742.89 hectares (1,835.7 acres) (2.7%) were urbanized areas. By 2014, eucalyptus plantations covered 140.830 square kilometres (54.375 sq mi) (50.72% of the municipal area), while native Atlantic Forest spanned 10.220 square kilometres (3.946 sq mi) (3.62% of the total area).

Santana do Paraíso has an environmental protection area (APA), which, together with neighboring protected areas such as the Serra dos Cocais in Coronel Fabriciano and other APAs in Ipatinga and Belo Oriente, forms an ecological corridor to the Rio Doce State Park (PERD), the largest Atlantic Forest remnant and one of the state’s main lake systems. However, parts of local APAs are used for pastures or eucalyptus cultivation. The Santana do Paraíso APA, created by municipal decree no. 066 on May 10, 1999, spans 19.12 square kilometres (7.38 sq mi) and includes, besides Atlantic Forest remnants, several lagoons and waterfalls open to visitors.

Key environmental issues in the city include flooding, which causes significant damage in low-lying, densely populated areas during the rainy season, and landslides on hills and slopes. These problems are often caused by residential construction on hillsides and high-risk zones, as well as waste and sewage dumped into streams and rivers. The city center and the Águas Claras neighborhood, located along watercourses, are typically among the hardest-hit areas by floods. Forest fires destroy native vegetation, degrading soil quality and further impairing air quality, compounded by atmospheric pollution from Vale do Aço mills.

== Demography ==
Historical population
Year	Pop.	±%
1991	13,082	—
2000	18,155	+38.8%
2010	27,265	+50.2%
2022	44,800	+64.3%
Source: Brazilian Institute of Geography and Statistics (IBGE)

In 2022, the population was estimated at 44,800 inhabitants by that year’s census, conducted by the Brazilian Institute of Geography and Statistics (IBGE), representing a 64.31% increase from 2010, when 27,265 residents were recorded. This is the second-highest population growth rate in Minas Gerais during this period, surpassed only by the municipality of Extrema (87.01%). According to the 2022 census, 22,125 inhabitants were men (49.38%) and 22,675 were women (50.61%). The same census reported that 43,623 inhabitants lived in the urban zone (97.37%) and 1,177 in the rural zone (2.63%).

Of the total population in 2022, 9,342 inhabitants (20.86%) were under 15 years old, 5,916 (13.21%) were aged 15 to 24, 12,277 (27.41%) were 25 to 39, 13,922 (31.08%) were 40 to 64, and 3,343 (7.46%) were 65 or older. In 2010, the life expectancy at birth was 77.7 years, and the total fertility rate per woman was 1.9.

=== Indicators and inequality ===
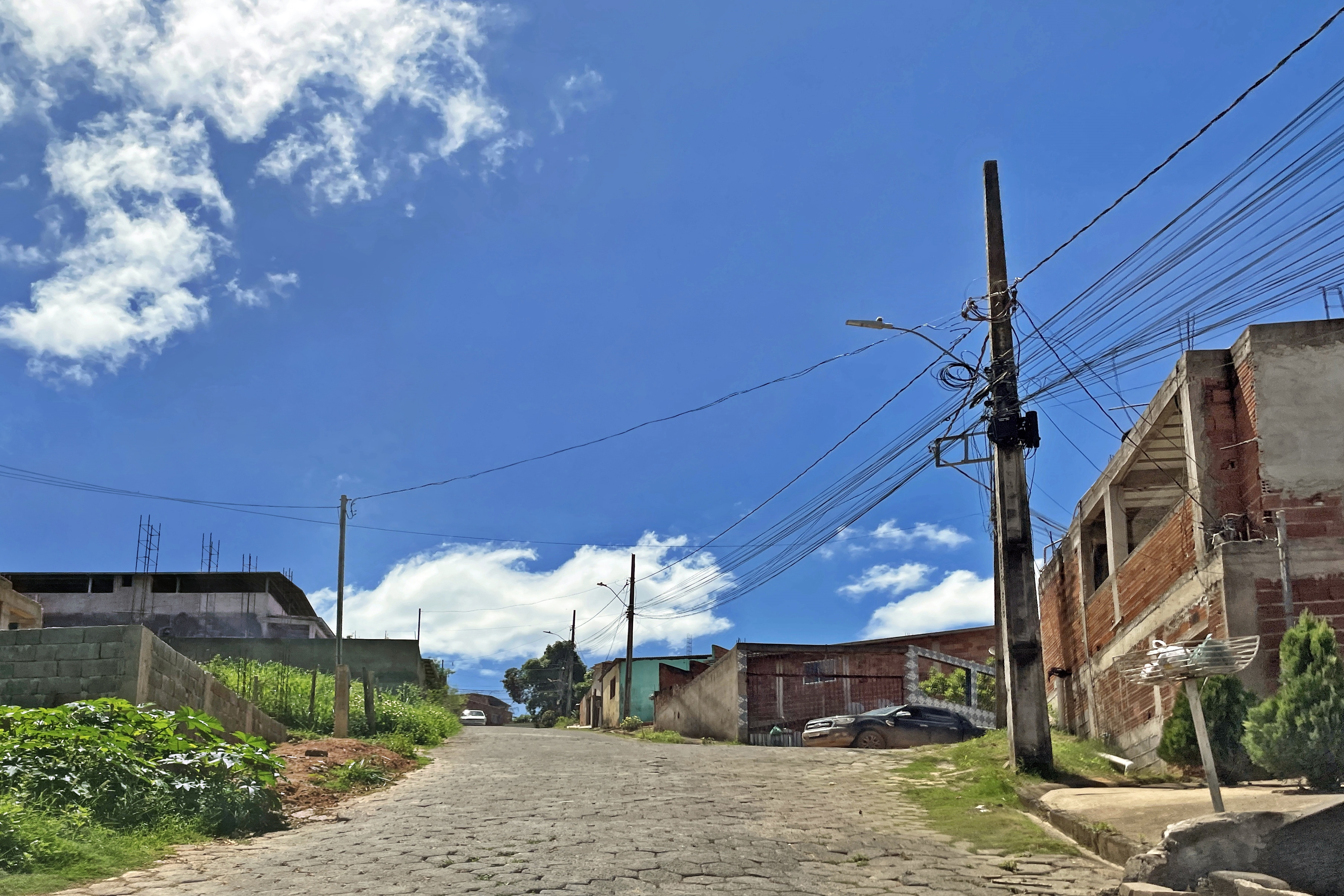
Residential street on a hill in the Alto Santana neighborhood

The Human Development Index (HDI-M) of Santana do Paraíso is considered medium by the United Nations Development Programme (UNDP), with a value of 0.685 (the 2,309th highest in Brazil). Most of the city’s indicators are close to or below the national average, according to the UNDP. The education index is 0.552, the longevity index is 0.878, and the income index is 0.663. From 2000 to 2010, the proportion of people with a per capita household income of up to half a minimum wage decreased by 69.0%. In 2010, 88.9% of the population lived above the poverty line, 7.3% were at the poverty line, and 3.8% were below it. The Gini coefficient, which measures social inequality, was 0.431, where 1.00 is the worst and 0.00 is the best. The share of the richest 20% of the population in the city’s total income was 47.0%, 8.9 times higher than that of the poorest 20%, which was 5.3%.

The rapid population growth following Santana do Paraíso’s emancipation meant that urban expansion was not accompanied by sufficient socioeconomic development to meet the population’s needs, leading to significant disorganized occupations and precarious subdivisions, particularly in the city’s periphery. Many subdivisions suffer from steep slopes, roads without drainage, and inadequate earthworks, making housing construction challenging or resulting in improper occupations. In 2012, about 55% of approved lots in the municipality remained unoccupied.

=== Ethnicity and religion ===
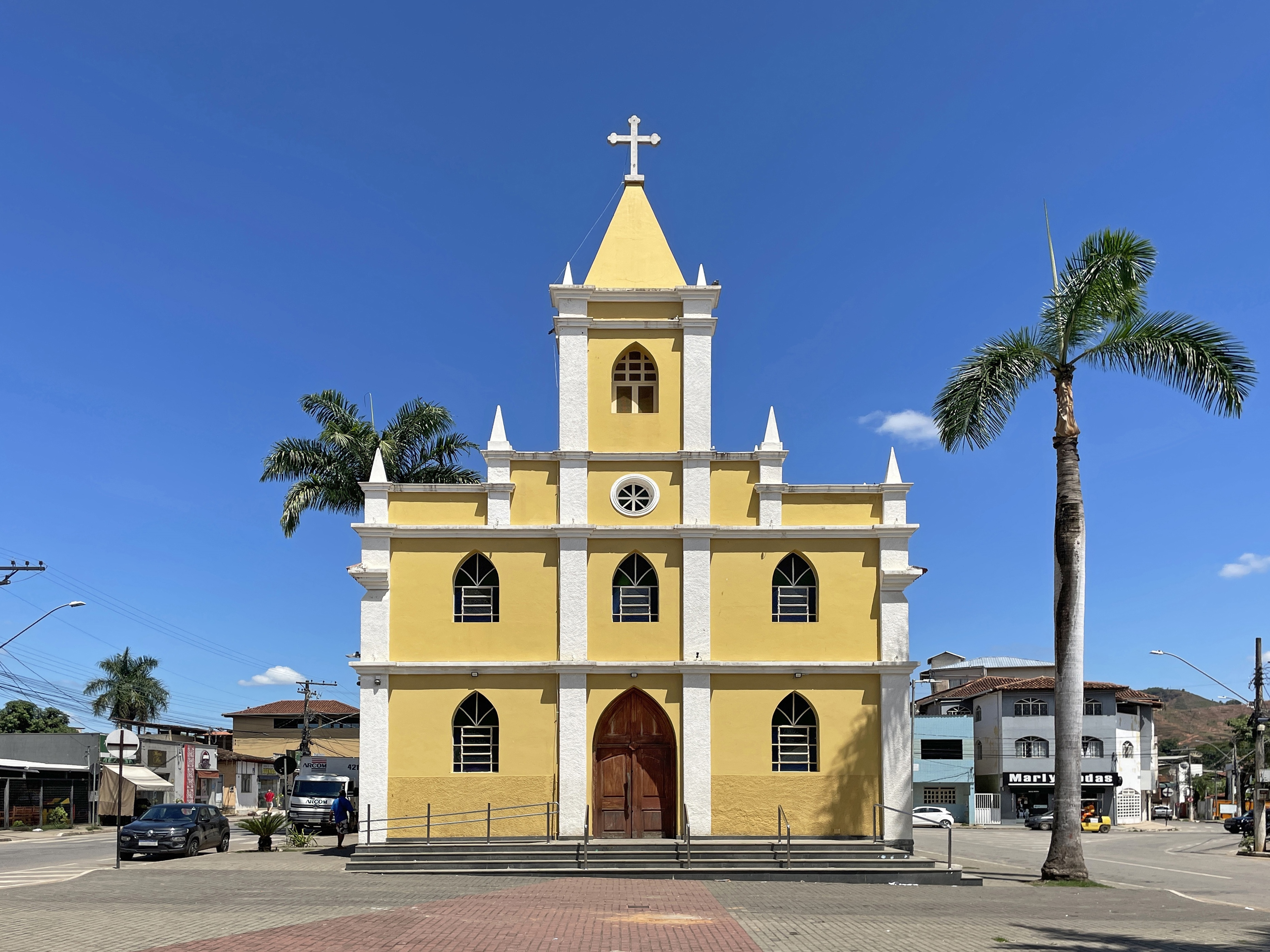
Santana Mother Church

In 2022, the population consisted of 26,169 pardos (58.41%), 13,150 whites (29.35%), 5,417 blacks (12.09%), 48 Asians (0.11%), and 16 indigenous people (0.04%). In 2010, by region of birth, 26,593 were born in the Southeast (97.54%), 319 in the Northeast (1.17%), 87 in the Central-West (0.32%), 54 in the South (0.20%), and 29 in the North (0.11%). Of these, 25,451 were natives of Minas Gerais (93.35%), with 9,323 born in Santana do Paraíso (34.20%). Among the 1,814 born in other states, São Paulo had the highest representation with 693 people (2.54%), followed by Espírito Santo, with 261 residents (0.96%), and Rio de Janeiro, with 188 residents (0.69%).

According to the 2022 IBGE census, the population aged ten or older comprised 17,482 Catholics (45.69%), 15,982 Evangelicals (41.77%), 1,960 people with no religion (5.12%), 140 followers of Umbanda and Candomblé (0.37%), with the remaining 7.05% distributed among other religions. The Santana Parish, part of Pastoral Region III of the Diocese of Itabira-Fabriciano, covers the municipal territory and is divided into 12 communities. Its headquarters, the Santana Mother Church, located in downtown Santana do Paraíso, is one of the municipality’s main landmarks.

== Politics and administration ==
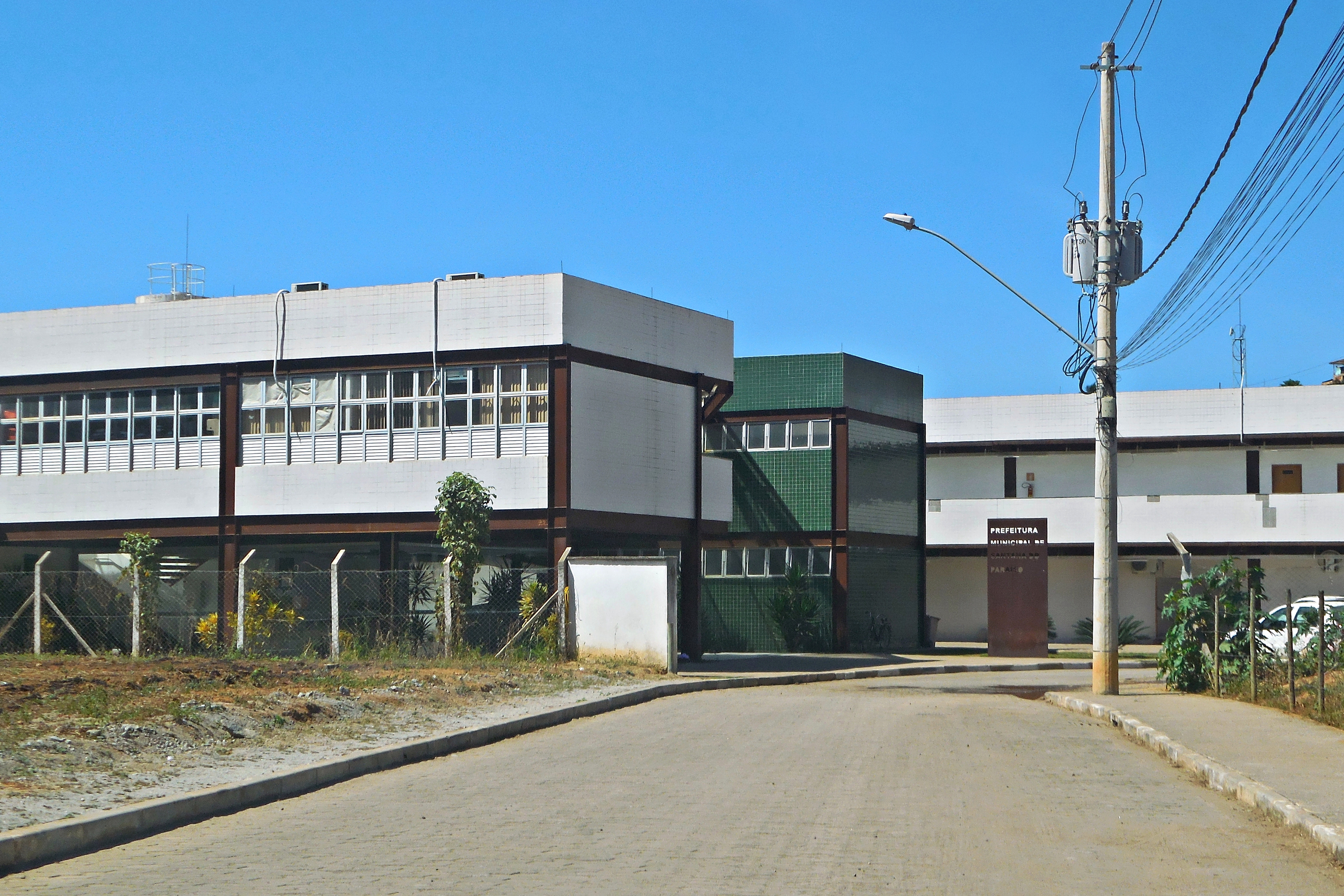
Santana do Paraíso City Hall

Municipal administration is carried out by the Executive and Legislative branches. The Executive is led by the mayor, supported by a cabinet of secretaries. The first Executive representative was Antônio Luiz, known as Maneca, elected after the city’s emancipation. The mayor elected in the 2024 municipal elections was Bruno Morato Campos, re-elected by Avante with 90.02% of valid votes for his second consecutive term, alongside José Anício de Almeida (Oliveirinha, MDB) as vice-mayor. The Legislative branch is represented by the municipal chamber, composed of eleven councilors. The council is responsible for drafting and voting on fundamental laws for administration and the Executive, particularly the participatory budget (Budget guidelines law). Complementing the legislative process and the work of the secretariats, several municipal councils are active, including those for children’s and adolescents’ rights (established in 1996) and guardianship (1996). Santana do Paraíso is governed by its organic law, promulgated on May 1, 1990, and since March 2010, it has been part of the Ipatinga District, under the state judiciary, along with the municipality of Ipaba. As of September 2024, the municipality had 25,989 voters, according to the Superior Electoral Court (TSE).

== Subdivisions ==
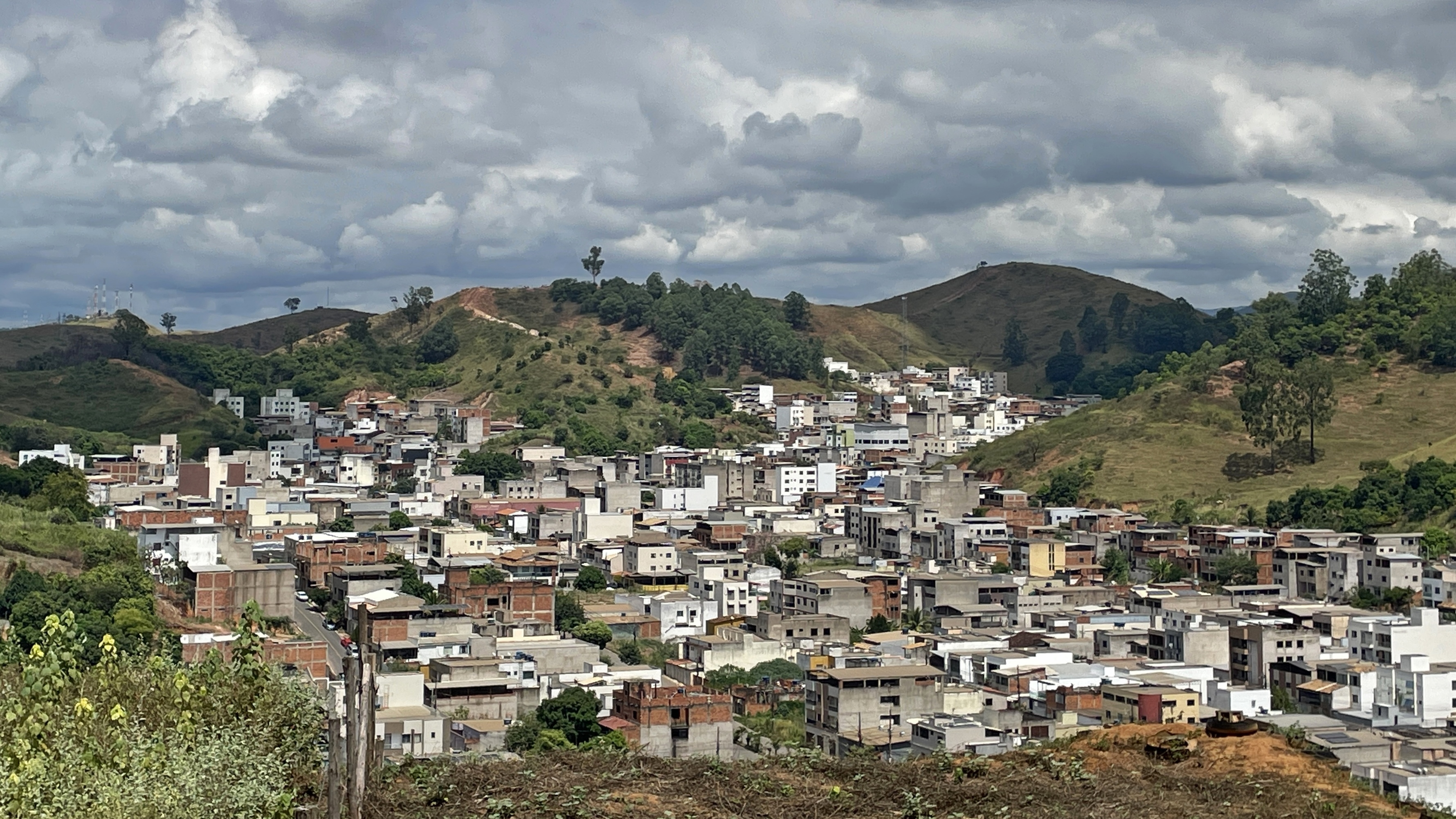
Partial view of the Jardim Vitória neighborhood, which forms a conurbation with Ipatinga.

Santana do Paraíso is not divided into districts. The municipality is organized into 12 neighborhoods within its urban perimeter. It also has ten rural communities and the Industrial District. Most neighborhoods in the central area are older and house about 40% of the municipal population, according to the IBGE in 2010. This zone includes the Alto Santana, Centro, Josefino Anício dos Reis, Oliveira, Residencial Paraíso, São Francisco, São José, Vale do Paraíso, and Veraneio neighborhoods.

Generally, irregular subdivisions and hillside occupations are concentrated in the central area, which also contains watercourses used for sewage disposal. Outside the central region and near Ipatinga’s urban perimeter, the Águas Claras and Industrial neighborhoods, established before Santana do Paraíso’s emancipation, account for about 39% of the population. The Ipaba do Paraíso neighborhood lies on the border with Ipaba, along the Doce River, and comprises about 7% of the population.

In conurbation with Ipatinga are several relatively recent subdivisions, established after the 1990s, including Cidade Nova, Jardim Vitória, Parque, Parque Caravelas, Residencial Betânia, and Residencial Bom Pastor. These areas have many vacant lots or ongoing constructions, but most new subdivisions feature considerable infrastructure. Notable are the small farms, primarily for high-standard residences, such as Chácaras Aeroporto, Chácaras do Vale, Chácaras do Vale Expansão, and Chácaras Paraíso I and II.

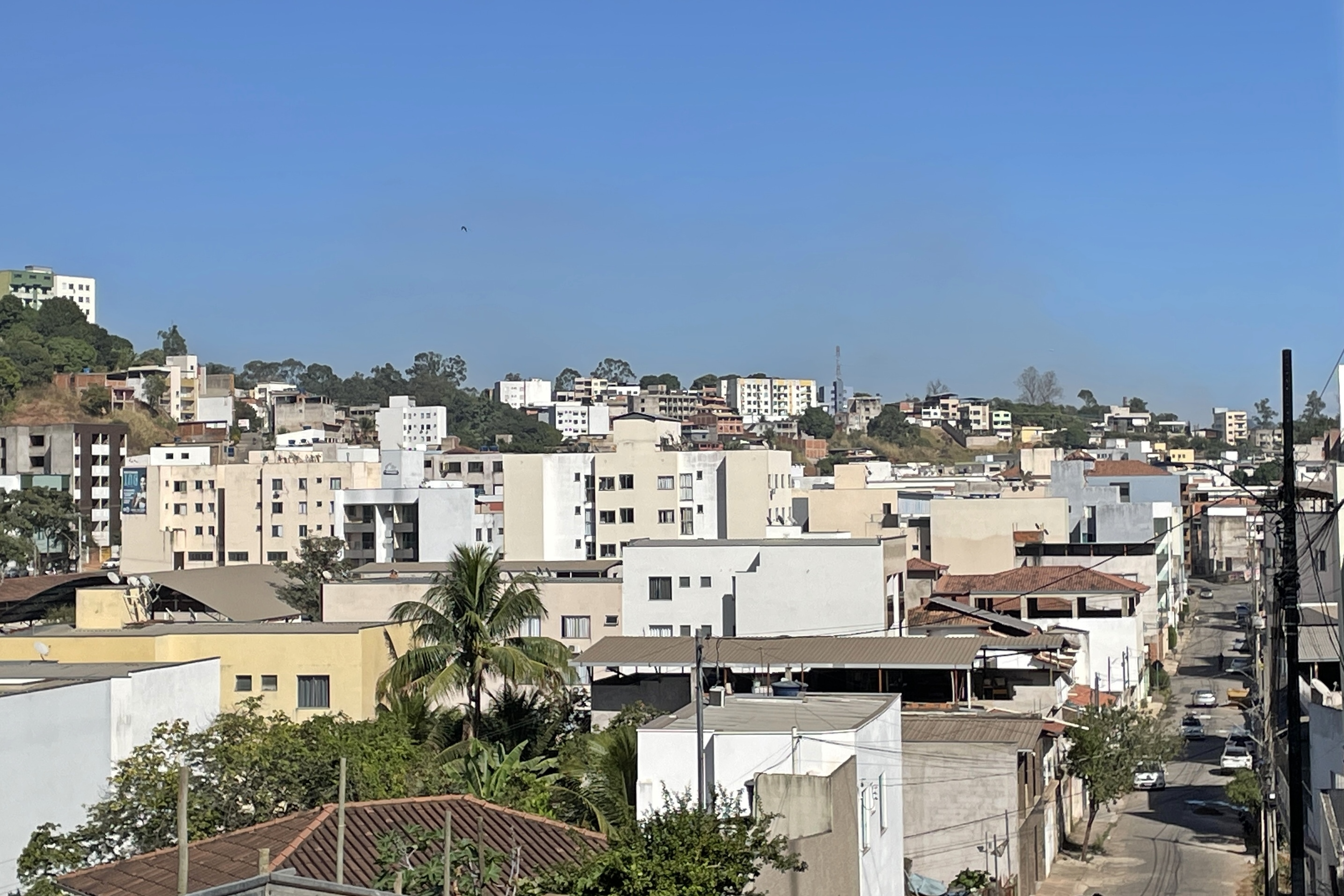
Partial view of the Cidade Nova neighborhood

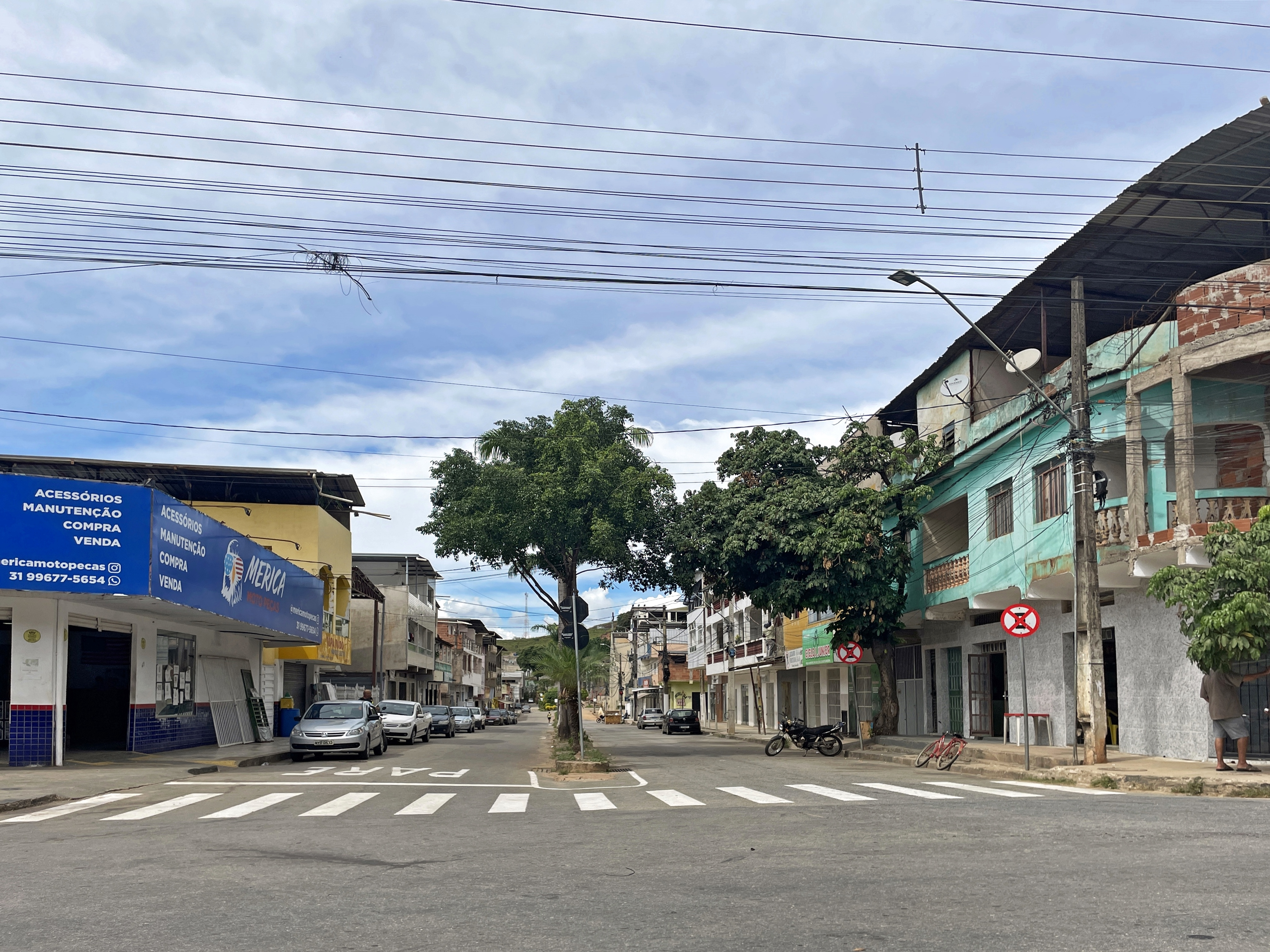
Lafaiete Lopes Avenue in the Industrial neighborhood

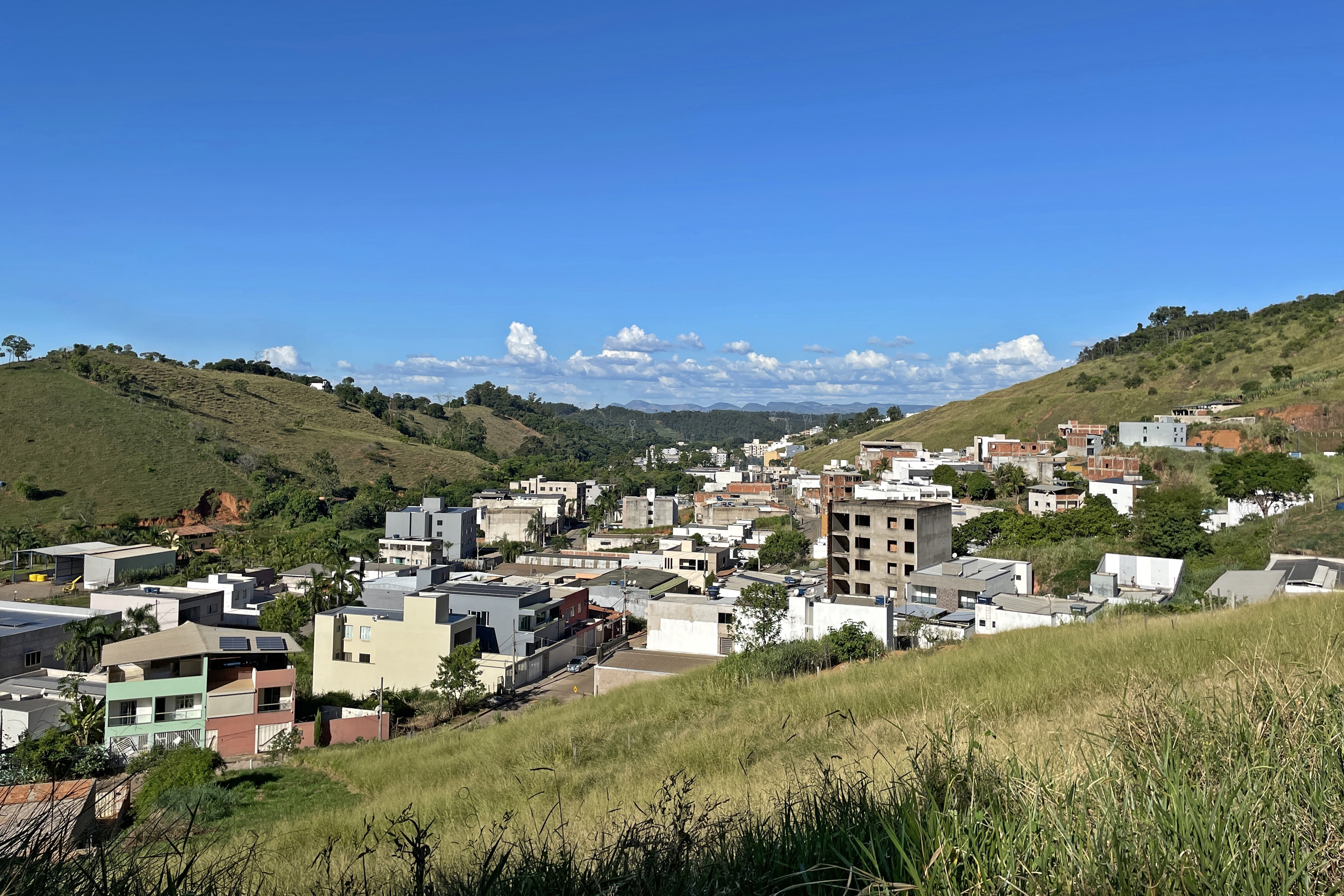
View of Residencial Betânia

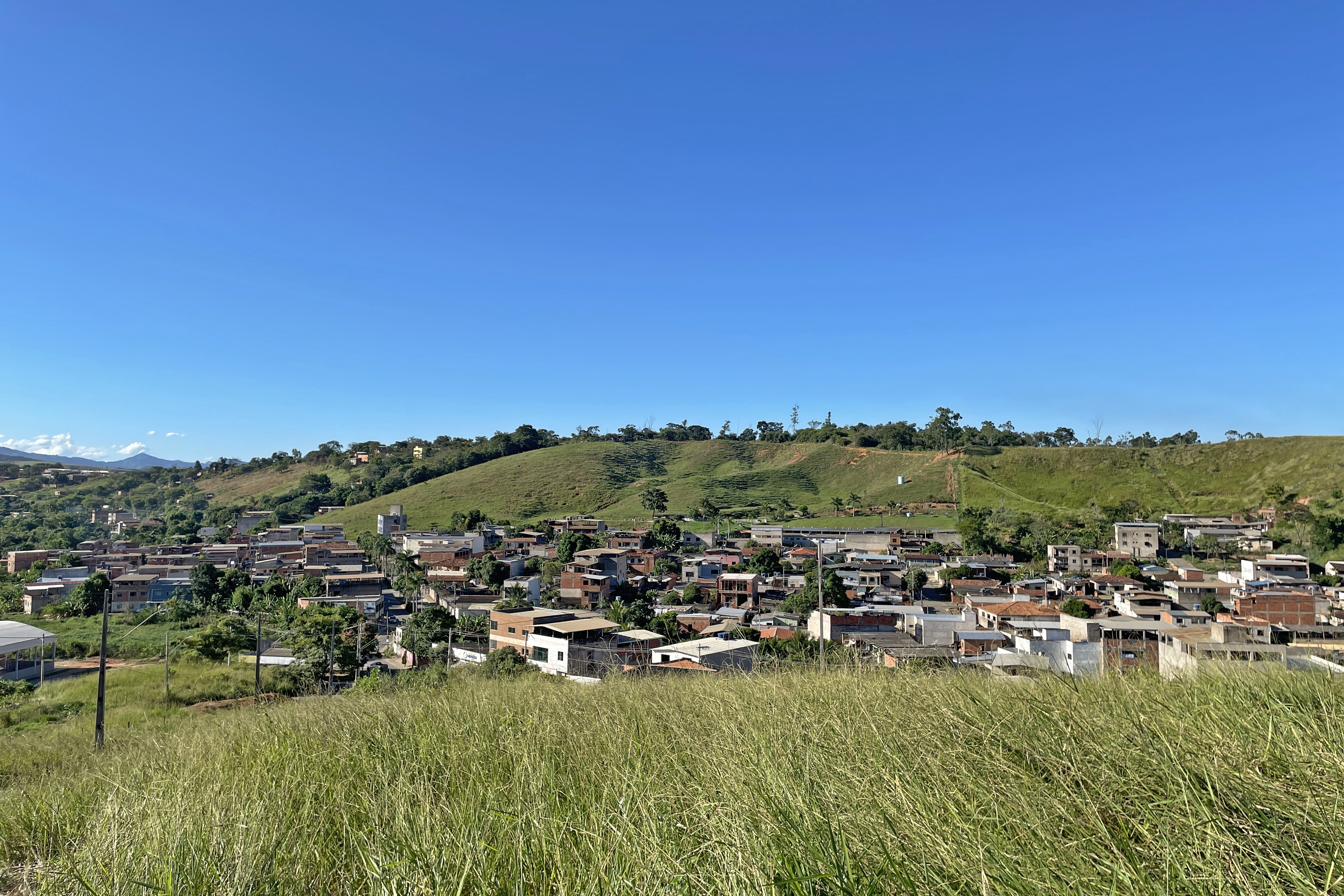
Partial view of the Águas Claras neighborhood

== Economy ==
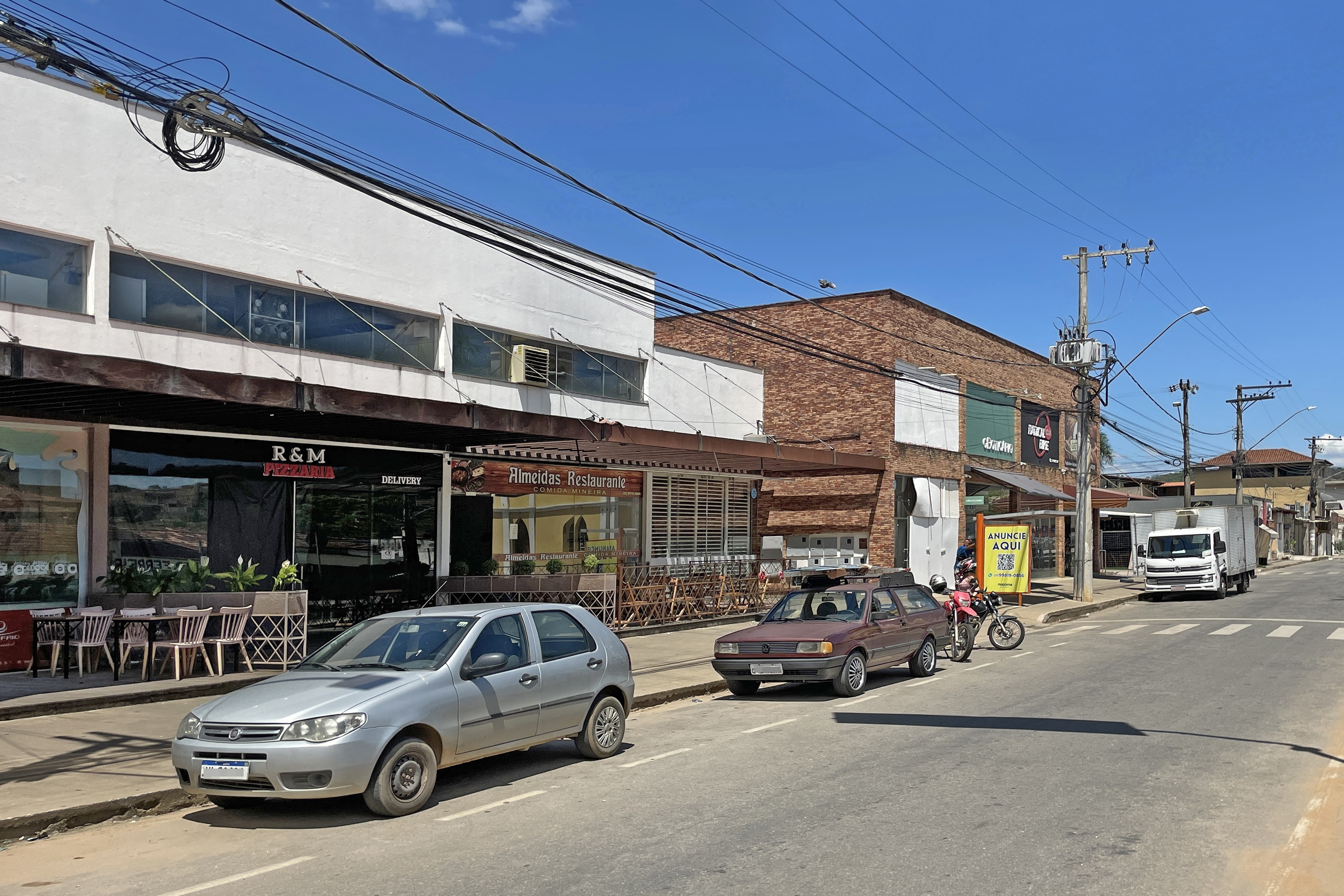
Commerce in downtown Santana do Paraíso

In the Gross Domestic Product (GDP) of Santana do Paraíso, the industrial and service sectors stand out. According to 2021 IBGE data, the municipality’s GDP at current prices was R$750,462,520. R$85,949,020 came from taxes on products net of subsidies at current prices, and the per capita GDP was R$20,818.42. In 2010, 67.30% of the population over 18 was economically active, with an unemployment rate of 10.39%. Notably, about 50% of the population commuted to another municipality for work, given the proximity and easy access to industrial complexes in other Vale do Aço Metropolitan Region municipalities.

In 2022, salaries and other remunerations totaled R$176,901,000, with an average monthly salary of 2 minimum wages. There were 1,552 local units. According to the IBGE in 2010, 67.93% of households survived on less than one minimum wage per resident (5,361 households), 26.62% had between one and three minimum wages per person (2,101 households), 2.31% earned between three and five wages (182 households), 0.72% had incomes above five minimum wages (57 households), and 2.41% had no income (190 households).

=== Agriculture and livestock ===
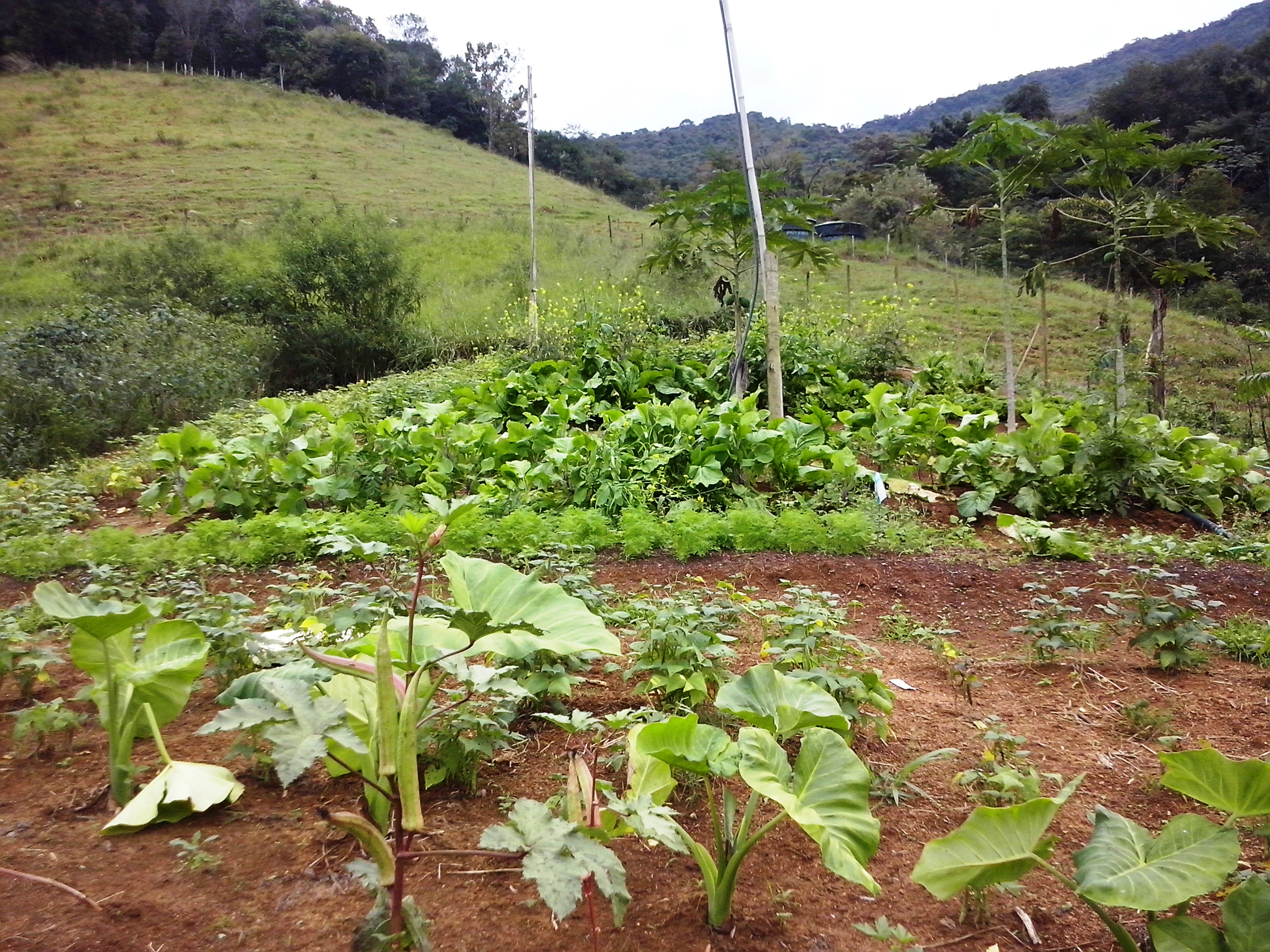
Agriculture in Santana do Paraíso

In 2021, livestock and agriculture contributed R$12,578,830 to Santana do Paraíso’s economy, while in 2010, 6.45% of the economically active population was employed in this sector. According to the IBGE in 2023, the municipality had a herd of 5,131 bovines, 4,120 gallinaceous birds, 625 equids, 412 pigs, 84 goats, 41 sheep, and 11 buffaloes. That year, the city produced 3,298,000 liters of milk from 910 cows, 16,000 dozens of chicken eggs from 1,310 hens, and 16,800 kilograms of honey from bees. In aquaculture, 2,000 kg of tilapia and 650 kg of carp were produced.

In temporary farming in 2023, the largest planted areas were for beans (46 hectares), corn (30 hectares), sugarcane (6 hectares), and manioc (1 hectare). In permanent agriculture, notable crops included coffee (12 hectares), bananas (3 hectares), and coconuts (1 hectare). The municipality has family farms that sell produce at open-air markets and local establishments, as well as agro-industries that export to other municipalities.

=== Industry and services ===
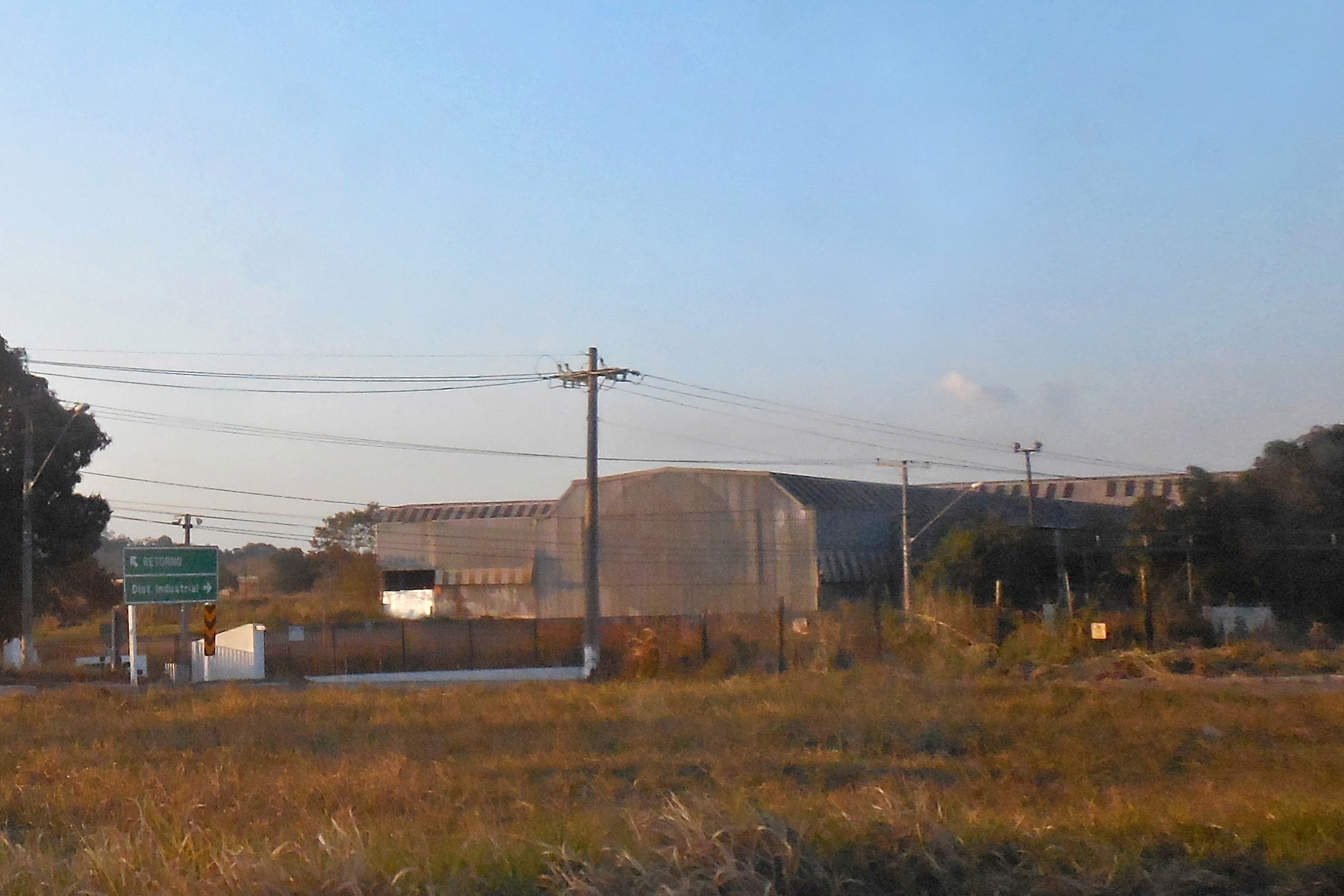
Warehouses in Santana do Paraíso’s Industrial District, along BR-458.

In 2021, industry was the second-largest contributor to the municipal economy, with R$182,546,570 of the gross added value from the secondary sector. In 2010, 0.40% of workers were employed in extractive industries and 21.48% in manufacturing. Santana do Paraíso has an industrial district, established in 2000, covering about 920,965 square metres (9,913,180 sq ft).

Among other industries, Santana do Paraíso is known for furniture manufacturing, food and beverage production, metalworking, and the Cimentos Cauê factory, as well as eucalyptus extraction to supply the Cenibra pulp mill in Belo Oriente. In 2023, according to the IBGE, 135,600 cubic meters of eucalyptus logs were extracted, with 99.63% destined for paper and pulp production.

In 2010, 12.97% of the employed population was engaged in the construction sector, 1.35% in public utilities, 11.99% in commerce, and 36.17% in the service sector. In 2021, 298,909.26 thousand reais of the municipal GDP came from the gross value added by the service sector, and 170,478.84 thousand reais from the gross value added by public administration. Commercial activity in Santana do Paraíso is relatively modest compared to other municipalities in the Vale do Aço Metropolitan Region. However, the city’s primary economic corridors include a segment encompassing Getúlio Vargas and Minas Gerais avenues and Sagrados Corações Street in the Centro district, where public services, commercial establishments, educational institutions, and healthcare facilities are concentrated.

== Infrastructure ==
=== Healthcare ===
The healthcare network in Santana do Paraíso comprises 12 primary healthcare units and one Psychosocial Care Center (CAPS), according to 2018 data. The city lacks hospitals and hospital beds, necessitating the transfer of severe cases and hospitalizations to neighboring municipalities. In 2010, there were 0.33 nurses, 0.37 dentists, and 0.2 physicians per thousand inhabitants, below the national averages of 0.69, 0.54, and 1.5, respectively. In 2022, 222 deaths were recorded due to morbidity, with diseases of the circulatory system being the leading cause (29.28%), followed by tumors (18.02%). In the same year, 746 live births were recorded, with an infant mortality rate of 5.36 deaths of children under one year per thousand live births. Notably, in 2010, 3.35% of girls aged 10 to 17 had given birth.

=== Education ===
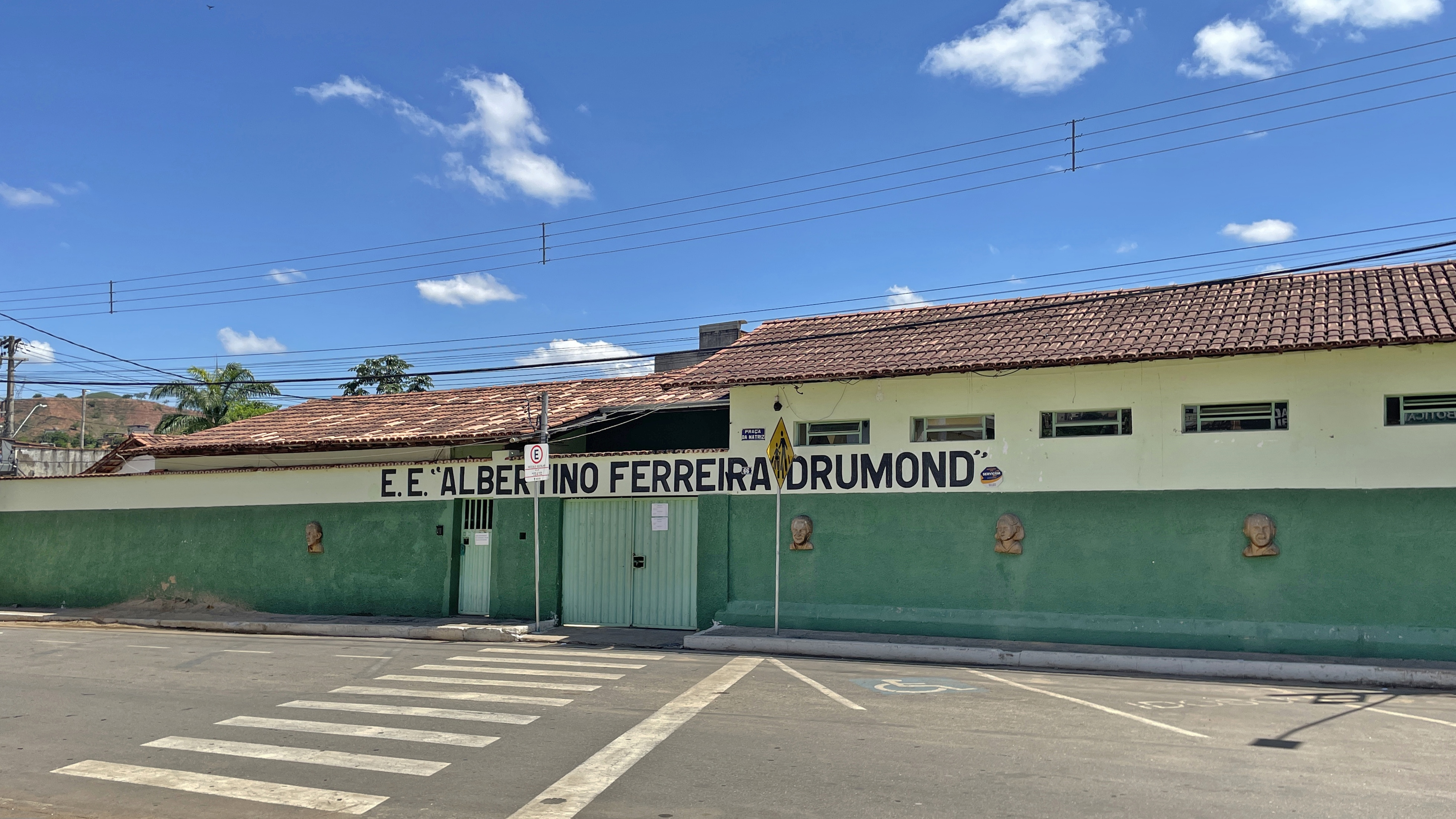
Facade of the Albertino Ferreira Drumond State School

In education, the Basic Education Development Index (IDEB) average score for early-year primary education students in Santana do Paraíso’s public schools was 6.2 in 2023, on a scale from 1 to 10, while final-year primary students scored 4.3. In 2022, 33.19% of children aged zero to three, 88.04% of those aged four to five, 98.9% of those aged six to 14, and 89.98% of adolescents aged 15 to 17 were enrolled in schools. Additionally, 17.95% of residents aged 18 to 24 and 4.29% of those 25 or older attended educational institutions.

Among residents aged 18 or older in 2022, 31.83% had not completed primary education, 12.47% had completed only primary education, 43.88% had completed secondary education, and 11.82% had completed higher education. On average, individuals aged 11 or older had 9.1 years of schooling. The literacy rate among residents aged 15 or older was 96.42%, leaving 3.58% of this age group illiterate. In 2023, there were 5,940 enrollments in the city’s early childhood education, primary, and secondary schools.

Education in Santana do Paraíso in numbers (2023)
Level	Enrollments	Teachers	Schools (Total)
Early childhood education	1,311	112	14
Primary education	3,587	215	13
Secondary education	1,042	111	6

=== Housing, services, and communications ===
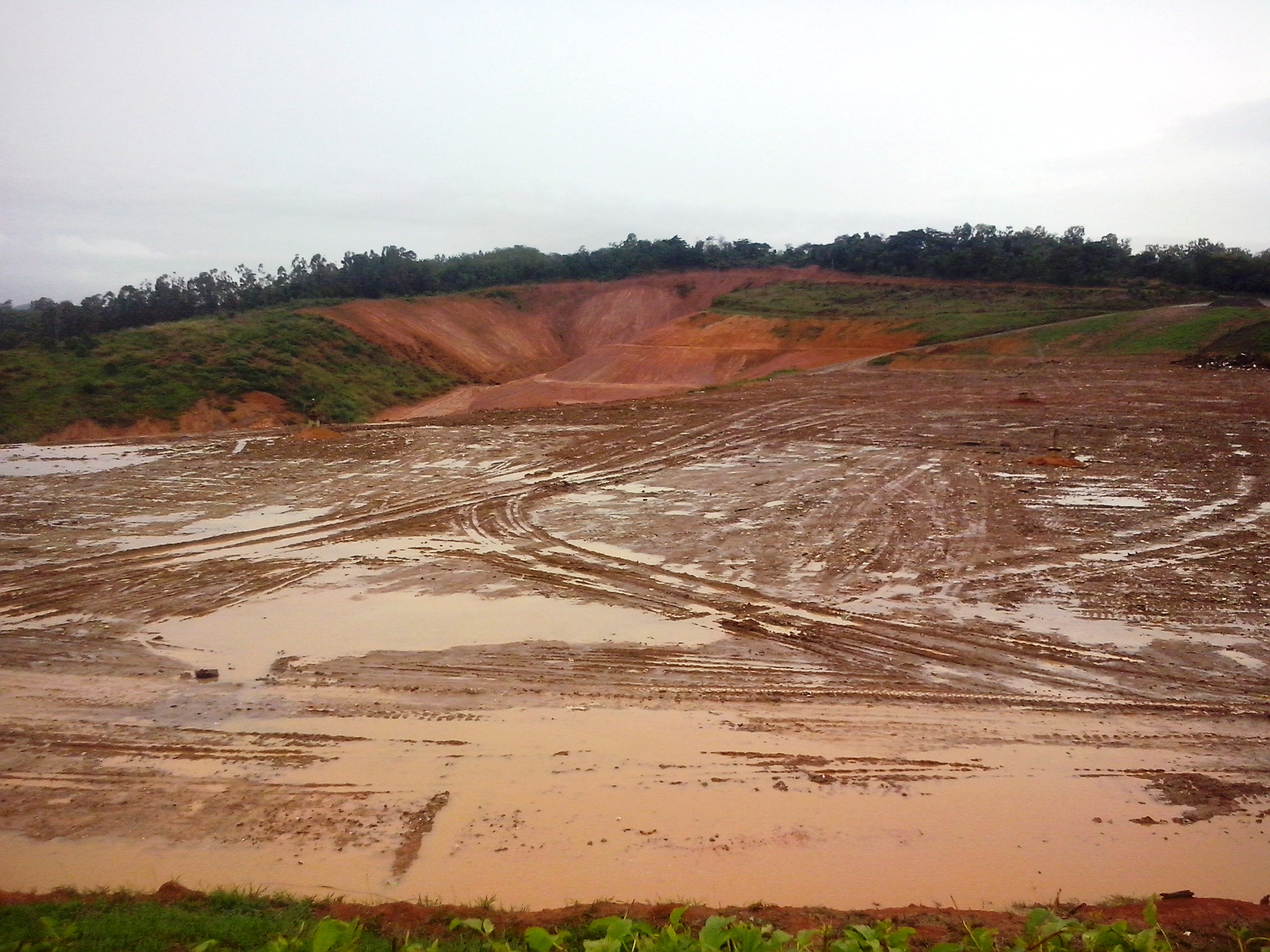
Landfill of the Vale do Aço Waste Center (CRVA)

In 2022, Santana do Paraíso had 16,720 occupied permanent private households. Of these, 11,331 were houses (67.77%), 5,338 were apartments (31.93%), 33 were houses in villages or condominiums (0.20%), 13 were tenements (0.08%), and five were degraded or unfinished structures (0.03%). Of the occupied households, 11,617 were owned (69.47%), with 9,310 fully paid and 2,306 under acquisition; 4,581 were rented (27.40%); 496 were loaned or ceded (2.97%); and 28 were occupied in other forms (0.17%).

Water supply and sewage collection services are provided by the Minas Gerais Sanitation Company (Copasa). In 2022, according to IBGE, 85.49% of households had access to the general water network as their primary supply source, and 99.99% had exclusive-use bathrooms. Regarding sewage disposal, 90.81% of households were served by the general or stormwater network. Much of the water used to supply the city and the Vale do Aço region comes from an alluvial aquifer located underground, extracted and treated at Copasa’s water treatment plant in the Amaro Lanari neighborhood of Coronel Fabriciano. However, Santana do Paraíso has five smaller collection and treatment points serving certain areas of the municipality. In March 2024, the sewage treatment plant (ETE) of the Garrafa Stream began operations, increasing the percentage of treated wastewater in the municipality from 1.5% to 80%, according to Copasa.

Electricity supply is managed by the Minas Gerais Energy Company (Cemig), which serves much of the state. In 2010, 99.6% of households had access to the electrical network, according to IBGE data. Regarding waste disposal, 99.16% of households were served by collection services in 2022, according to the census, with waste directed to the Vale do Aço Waste Center (CRVA). Operational since 2003, it is located near the Águas Claras neighborhood and also receives waste from other Vale do Aço municipalities and surrounding areas. Waste pickers maintain an informal waste-sorting system for recyclable materials.

The telephone area code (DDD) for Santana do Paraíso has been 031 since March 2013, replacing the former 033. The postal code (CEP) ranges from 35179-000 to 35179-999. On November 10, 2008, the city began offering number portability. Postal services are provided by Correios post offices in the Centro, Industrial, and Ipaba do Paraíso neighborhoods. The city has local community radio and FM stations, as well as newspapers published locally or in the Vale do Aço Metropolitan Region, such as Diário do Aço.

== Security and crime ==
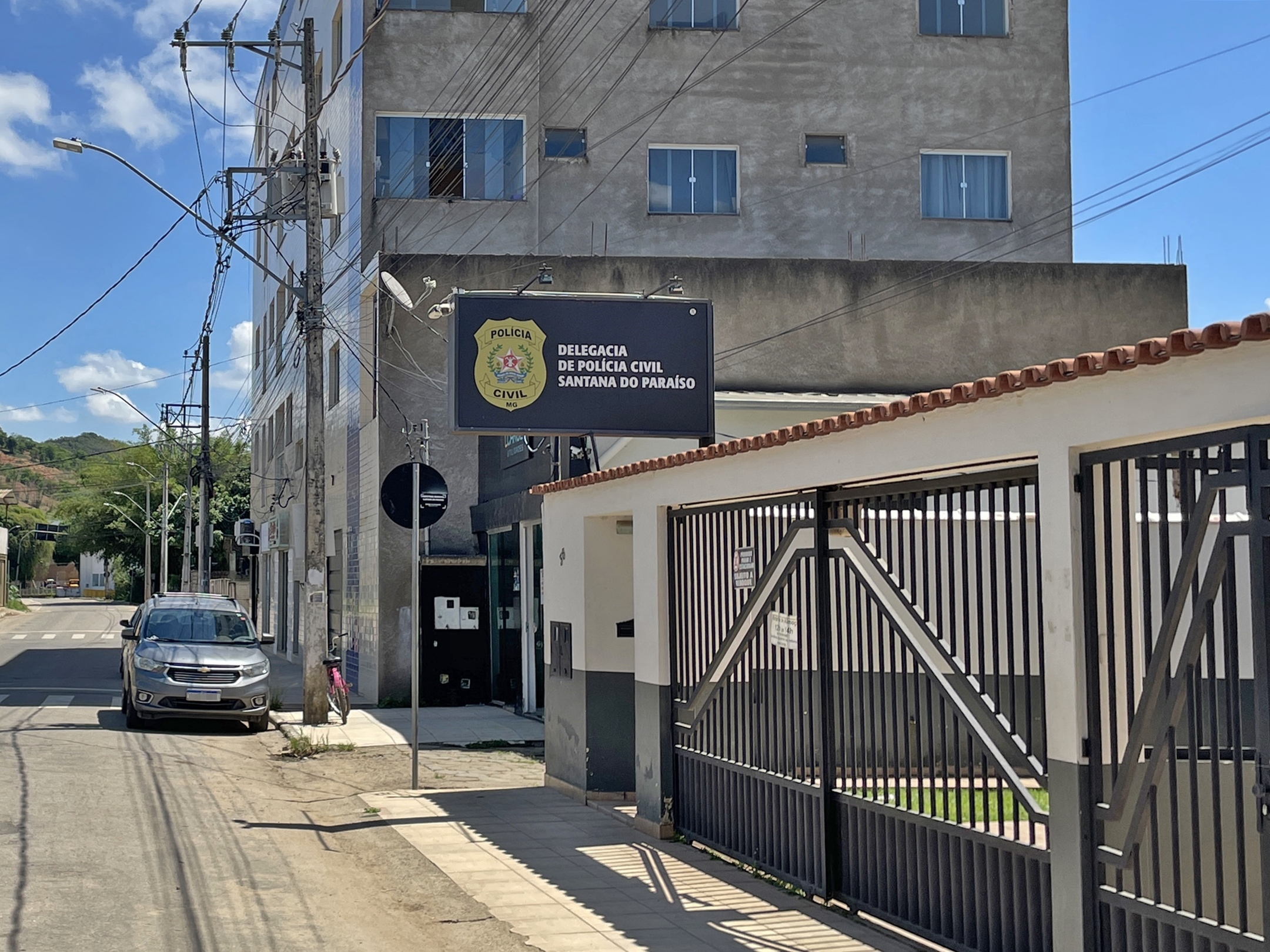
Police station of the Civil Police in Santana do Paraíso

Public safety in Santana do Paraíso is provided by various organizations. The Military Police of Minas Gerais State, a state-level force, is responsible for policing cities, patrolling banks, protecting the environment, securing prisons, ensuring school safety, and providing security for special events. The force also carries out social integration initiatives. The municipality is served by the Ipatinga Military Police Battalion. The Civil Police of Minas Gerais aims to combat and investigate crimes and infractions. The city's Civil Police station constitutes an Integrated Public Safety Area (AISP), which is subordinate to the Ipatinga Regional Civil Police Department. The Civil Defense, under the municipal government, also operates in the area.

In 2013, the Military Police recorded a total of 91 violent crimes, including 60 robberies (65.9%), 16 attempted homicides (17.6%), and 15 homicides (16.5%). In 2022, three homicides were recorded, a decrease from five in 2021. The worst year from 2000 to 2022 was 2011, with 15 incidents. Some homicides are linked to drug trafficking, which also contributes to other crimes, as users often steal and rob to sustain their addictions. The Industrial and Cidade Nova neighborhoods are identified by the police as the most violent, where the majority of incidents in the municipality are concentrated.

== Transport ==
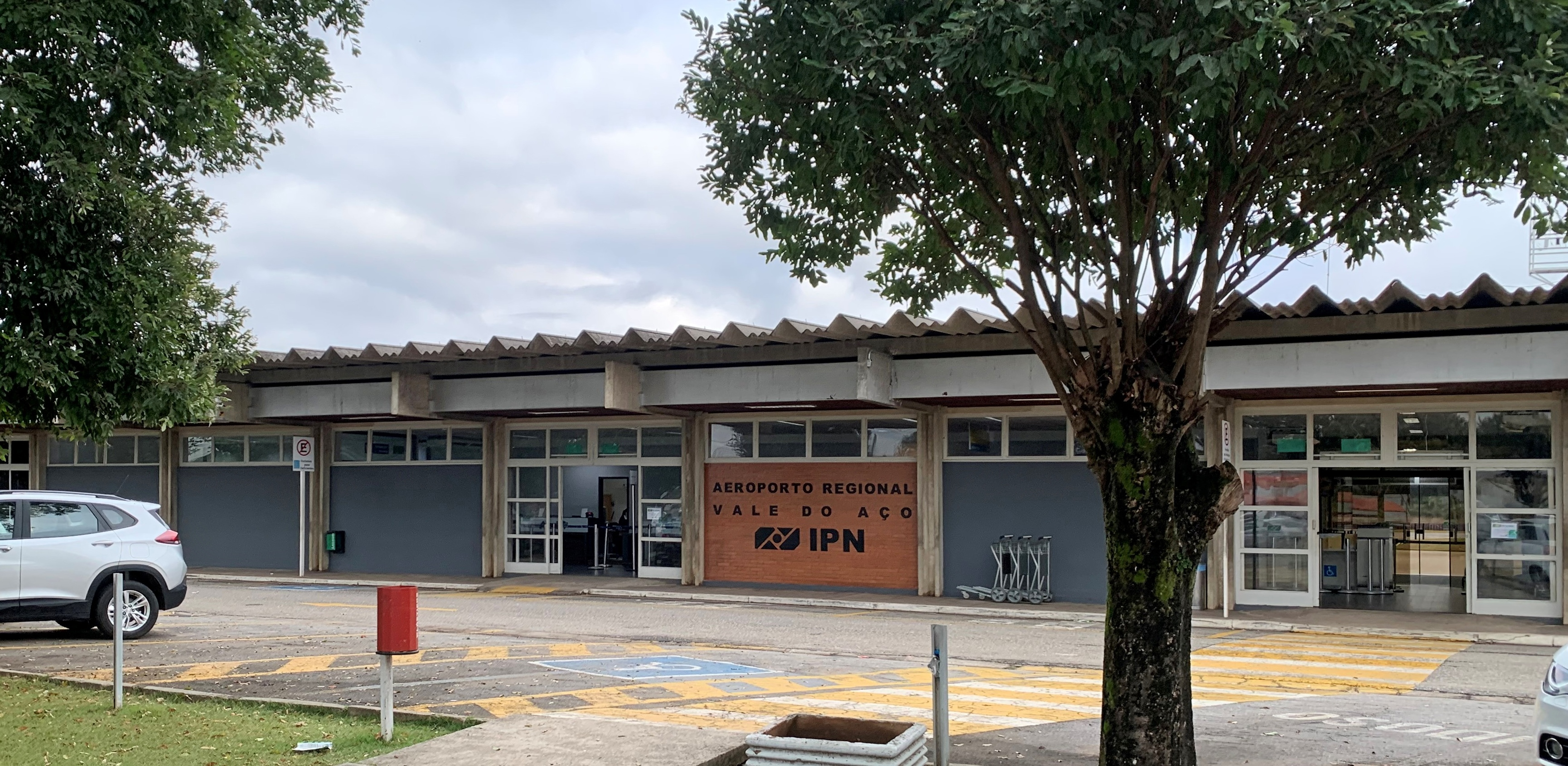
Passenger terminal of the Vale do Aço Regional Airport, located in Santana do Paraíso.

Air transport is available through the Ipatinga Airport (IATA: IPN, ICAO: SBIP), known as the Vale do Aço Regional Airport, located in Santana do Paraíso. Built by Usiminas, it is situated approximately 3 kilometres (1.9 mi) from the center of the neighboring city and serves the entire Vale do Aço Metropolitan Region with daily flights to the Belo Horizonte Metropolitan Region, although it has offered other destinations in the past. The municipality is also crossed by the Vitória-Minas Railway (EFVM), which enables passenger rail transport through the station located in Ipaba do Paraíso.

The municipal vehicle fleet in 2023 consisted of 13,408 vehicles, including 7,205 cars, 3,694 motorcycles, 868 pickup trucks, 368 trucks, 360 vans, 236 trailers, 213 mopeds, 100 scooters, 96 tractor-trucks, 84 utility vehicles, 58 buses, 56 minibuses, 56 semi-trailers, eight wheel tractors, five tricycles, and one sidecar. In 2024, a 10 kilometres (6.2 mi) bike lane was paved along the MG-232, connecting the Industrial neighborhood to the center of Santana do Paraíso. However, sidewalk infrastructure is deficient in many neighborhoods, with issues such as irregularities, obstacles, and lack of pavement continuity. The municipality is intersected by the federal highways BR-381, the main route to the state capital and Espírito Santo; and BR-458, connecting the Vale do Aço to the BR-116. However, only the MG-232 directly serves the city center, linking it to Ipatinga and extending to the MG-010, near the Belo Horizonte Metropolitan Region. Univale Transport provides direct bus lines connecting the main neighborhoods of the municipality to Ipatinga.

== Culture ==
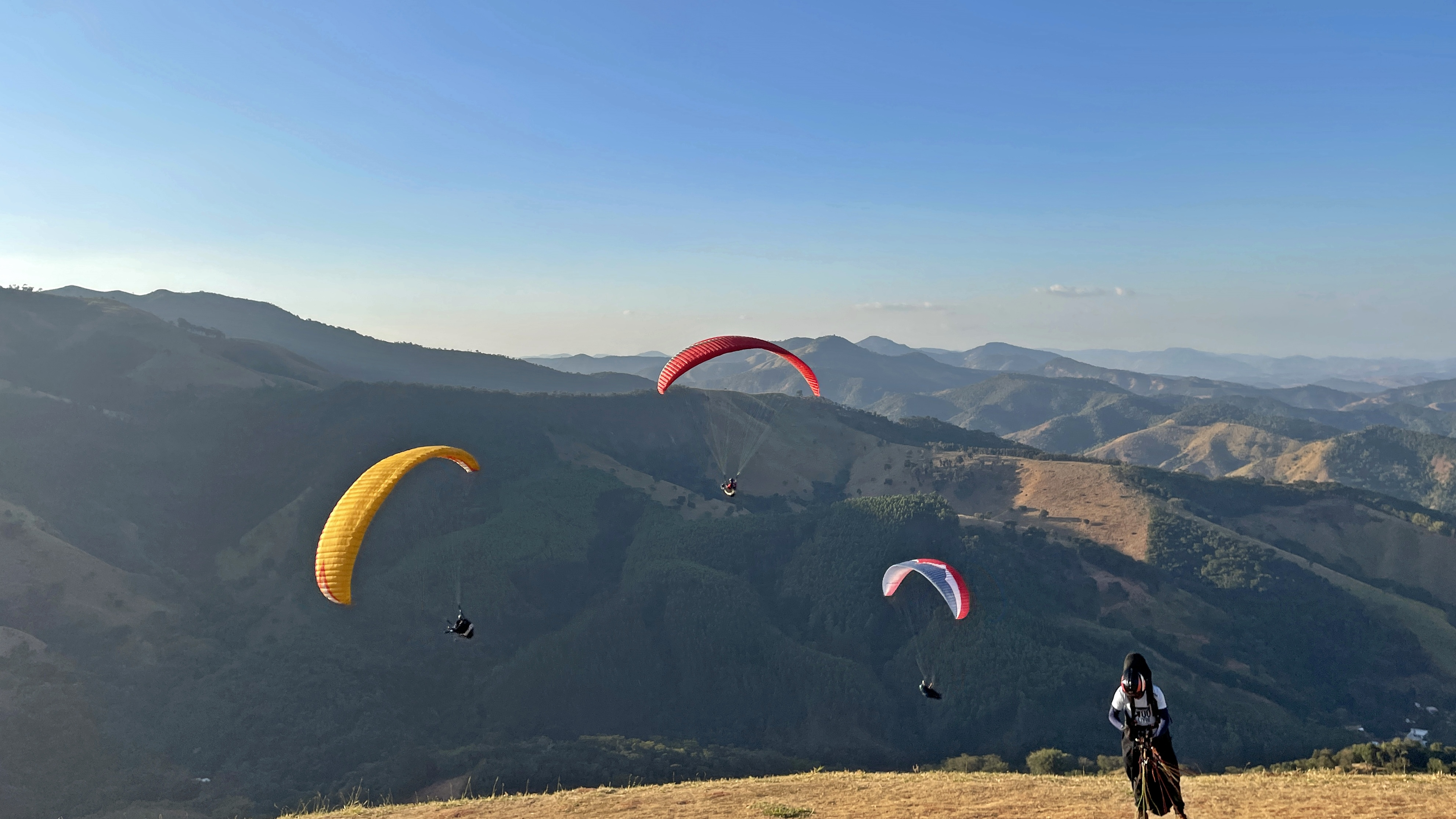
Paragliding jump at Serra da Viúva

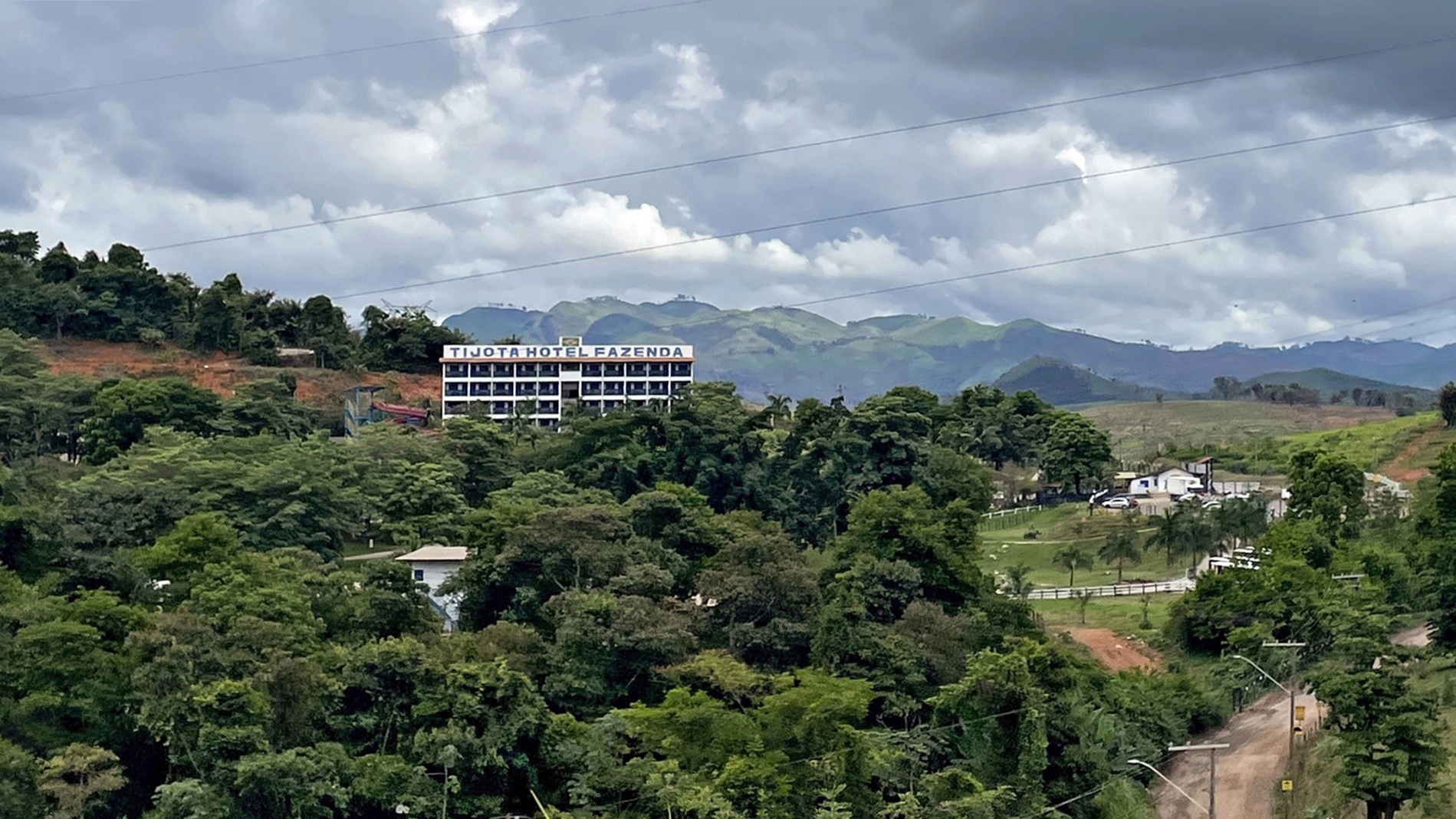
Tijota Hotel Fazenda, a guesthouse in the rural area of the municipality.

Santana do Paraíso has a municipal culture council, established in 2006, which is deliberative and composed of equal representation from government and civil society. There are also municipal laws for the protection of tangible cultural heritage, managed by a department of the municipal government responsible for cultural affairs. The municipality's cultural policy score for the ICMS Cultural calculation, valid for 2024, was 1.50 on a scale from 0 to 4. The total score, considering factors such as conservation, expenditure, and the number of registered or listed heritage assets, was 8.35.

=== Arts and folklore ===
Among the cultural spaces, a publicly maintained library and sports stadiums or gymnasiums stand out, according to the IBGE in 2005 and 2012. There are artistic groups for theater, dance, choir, folklore, and music, according to the IBGE in 2012. Handicrafts are one of the most spontaneous forms of cultural expression in Santana do Paraíso, with the main artisanal activities, according to the IBGE, being embroidery and work with recyclable materials. In rural areas, family farming stands out with the production of sausages, honey, coffee, sweets, biscuits, bread, requeijão, and avoador, among other homemade foods. At times, the municipality's artisanal production is exported to neighboring municipalities.

The city has a rich and diverse folklore. One of its main cultural manifestations is the Congado de Nossa Senhora do Rosário, a traditional marujada group that sings marches in honor of Our Lady of the Rosary during festive occasions in the city. Founded by a group of farmers in the 1960s, it faced the risk of disbanding after the death of Albertino Daniel, one of its pioneers, but persisted with around 20 members, according to 2011 information. Through the Rouanet Law, Usiminas, in partnership with the municipal government, occasionally brings a diverse program to Santana do Paraíso, including workshops, cultural performances, and cinema. These events take place in schools and the city's main squares, open to the general public.

=== Landmarks and events ===
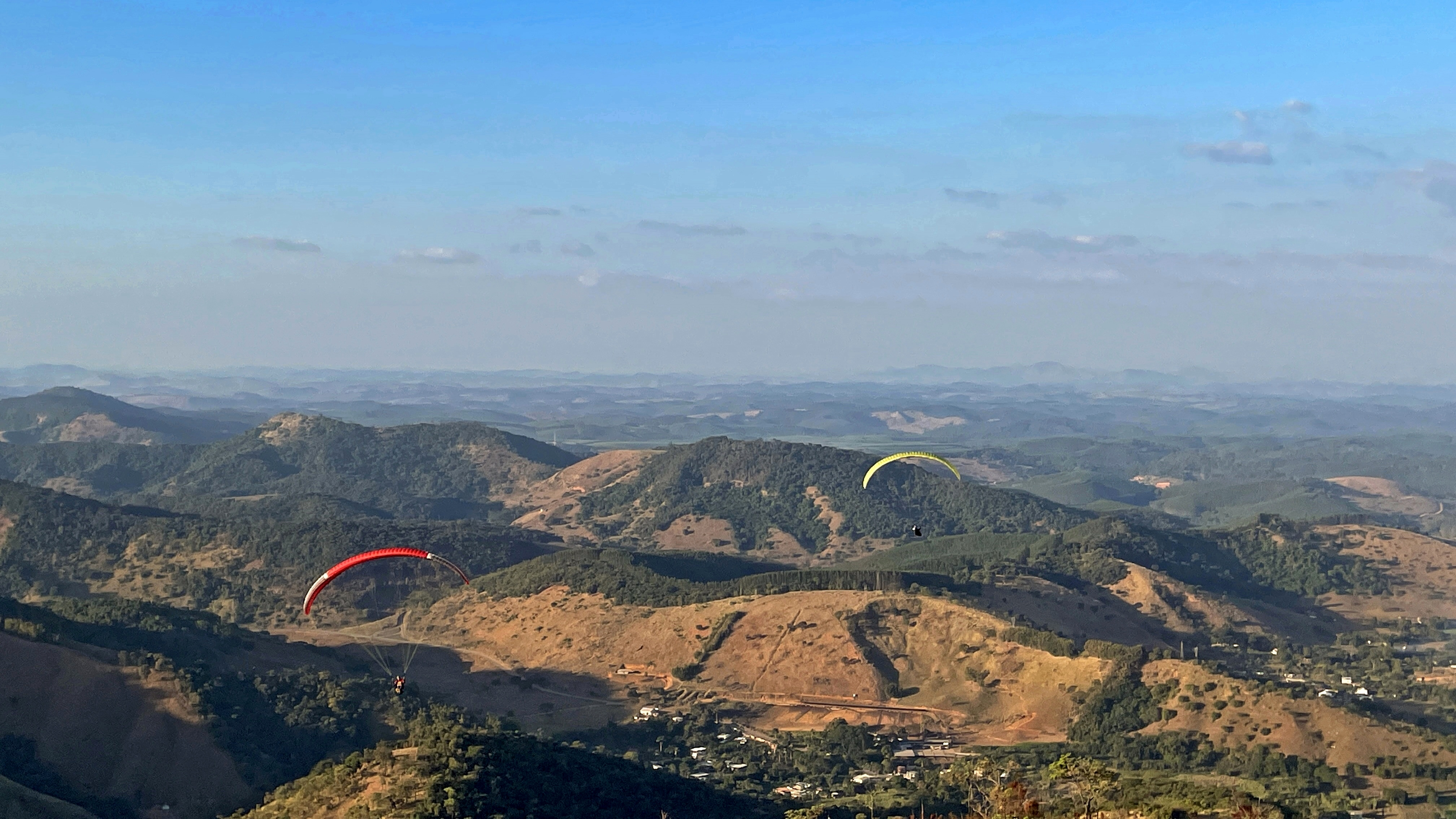
Horizon of the municipality seen from Serra da Viúva

Santana do Paraíso is part of the Mata Atlântica de Minas Gerais Tourist Circuit, officially established in 2010 by the Minas Gerais State Tourism Secretariat to promote tourism in the region. The main natural attractions of the municipality are the numerous trails, forests, lagoons, and waterfalls in the rural area, some equipped with infrastructure for visitors. Among the most visited waterfalls are Engenho, Cima, Bela Vista, and Bitinga. Many of its small rivers are suitable for extreme sports such as aqua-trekking, and there are rock formations used for climbing and paragliding jumps.

One of the sites used for paragliding is Serra da Viúva, which reaches an altitude of 900 meters. The José Paulino dos Santos Paragliding Ramp, located in this geological formation, is a reference for the sport in the region and has attracted practitioners from other states and countries. It is open to visitors and also offers scenic views. Another geographical landmark used for tourism is Pedra dos Tancredos, located near the city center. It serves as a city reference point and is used for climbing.

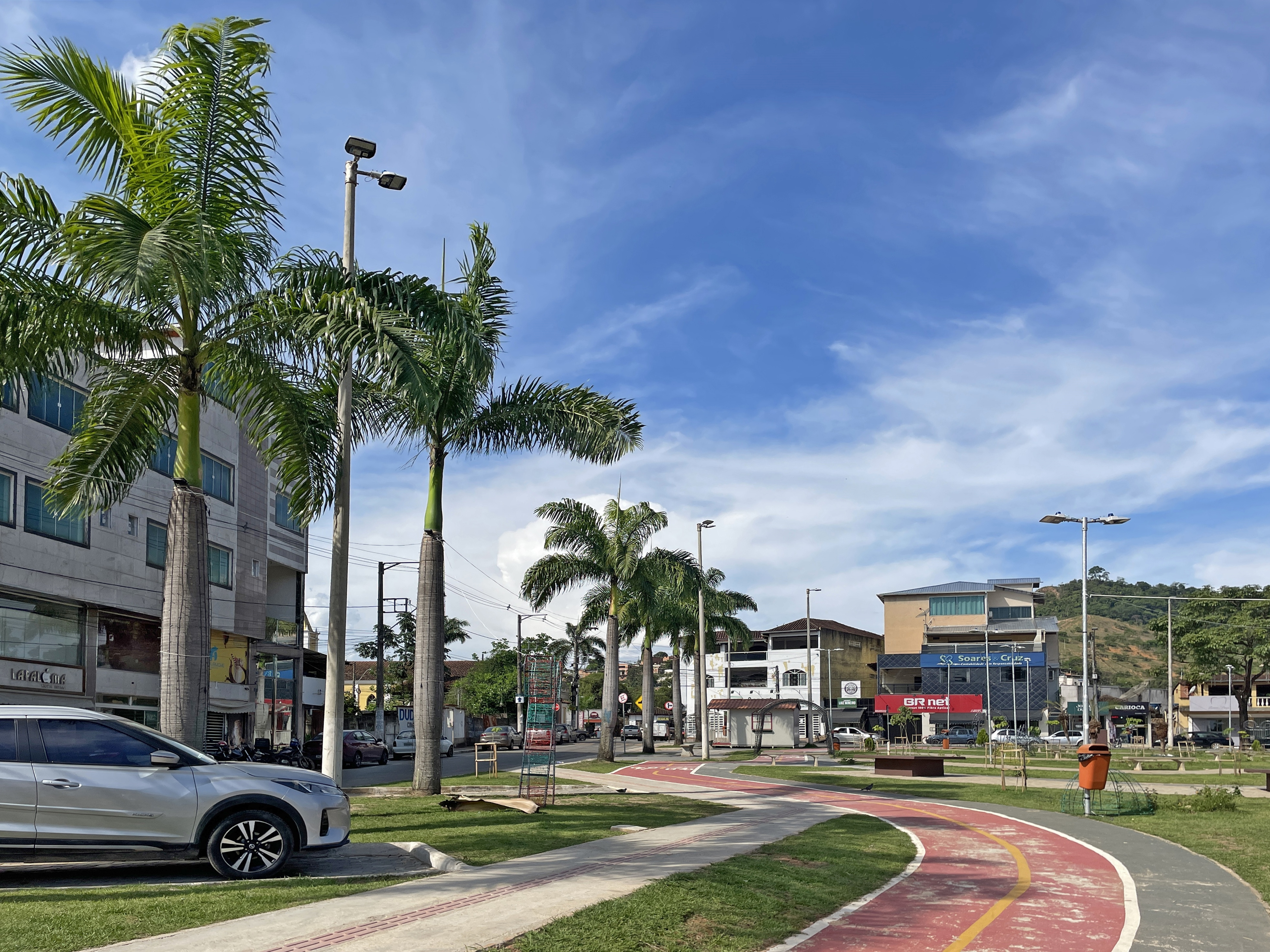
Pedestrian and cyclist paths at Dona Maria do Carmo Events Square

In the urban area, notable assets listed as cultural heritage by the municipal government include the Santana Mother Church, located in Praça da Matriz in the city center, maintained by the Santana Parish; the mulberry tree on Minas Gerais Avenue, a landmark at the city's entrance via MG-232; and the Ipaba do Paraíso Manor, which served as a residence for railway workers involved in the construction of the Vitória-Minas Railway (EFVM) in the region and later functioned as a school and health center. Both Praça da Matriz and Dona Maria do Carmo Events Square, both in the city center, are also city landmarks and frequently used to host events.

Among the main events regularly held in Santana do Paraíso, which are significant attractions, are the Feast of the Divine, held with the participation of the Congado de Nossa Senhora do Rosário in January; the city's anniversary celebrations, marked on 28 April but featuring a program spanning several days with exhibitions, contests, religious events, a race, and musical performances with regional bands, along with a cake symbolizing the city's age in meters; and the feast of Saint Anne, the municipal patron saint, held annually in July with food stalls, musical performances, special religious celebrations, and a fireworks show that attracts thousands of people in some editions.

=== Holidays ===
In Santana do Paraíso, there are two municipal holidays and eight national holidays, in addition to optional holidays. The municipal holidays are the city's anniversary, celebrated on 28 April; and the day of Saint Anne, the municipal patron saint, observed on 26 July.

== See also ==
- List of municipalities in Minas Gerais
