= Governador Valadares, Minas Gerais =

Governador Valadares
- Municipality
- Municipality of Governador Valadares
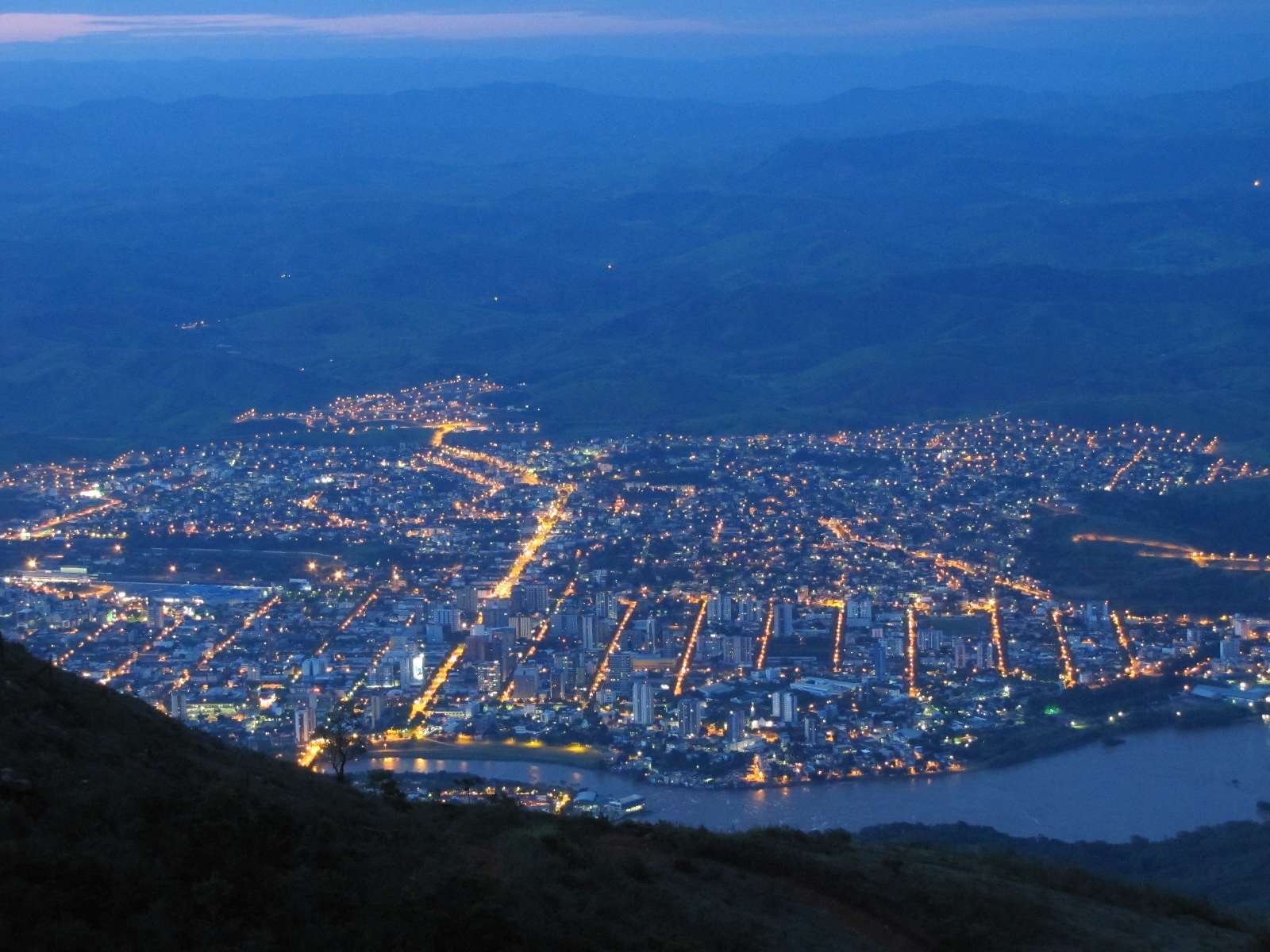
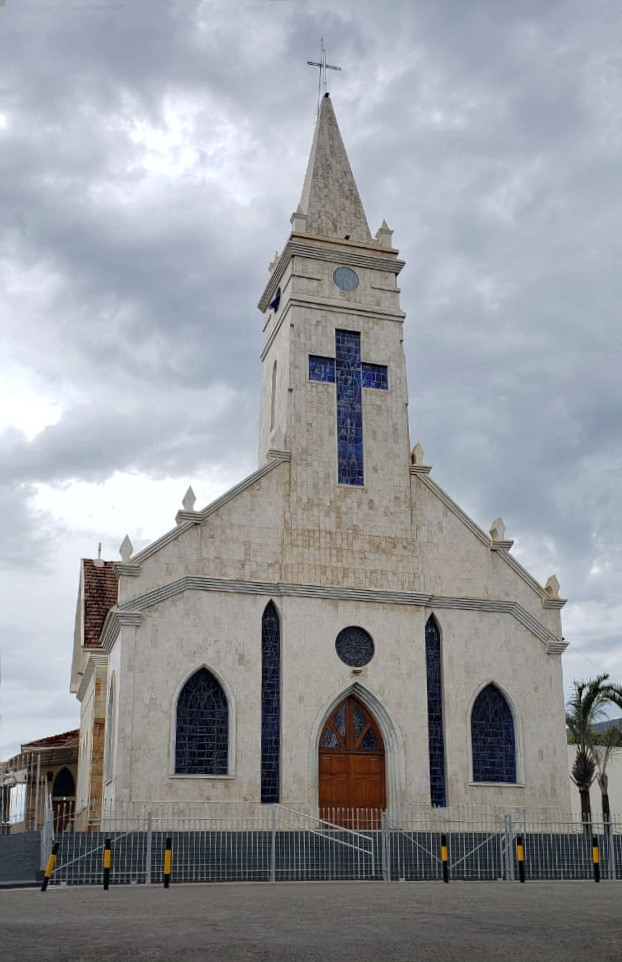
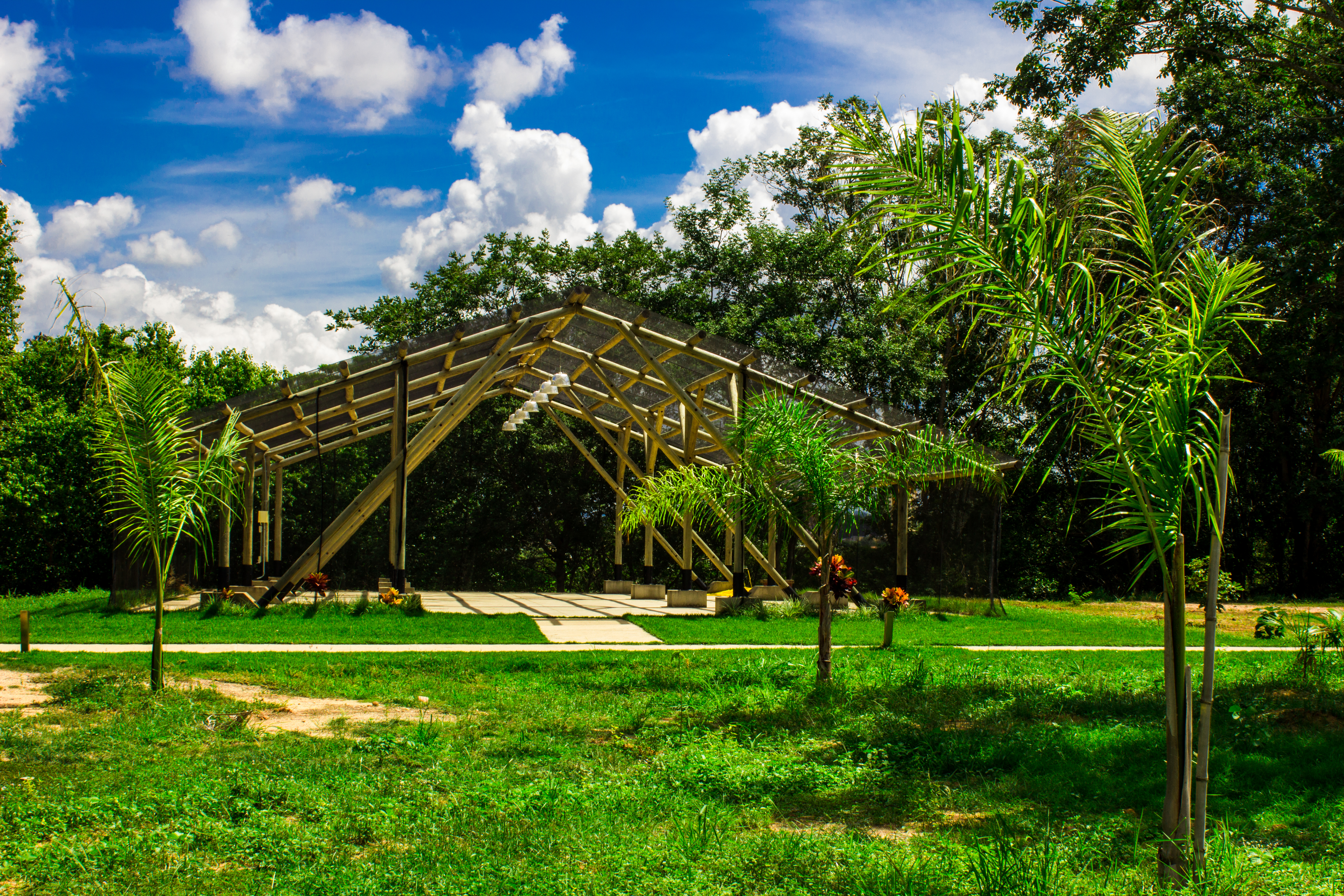
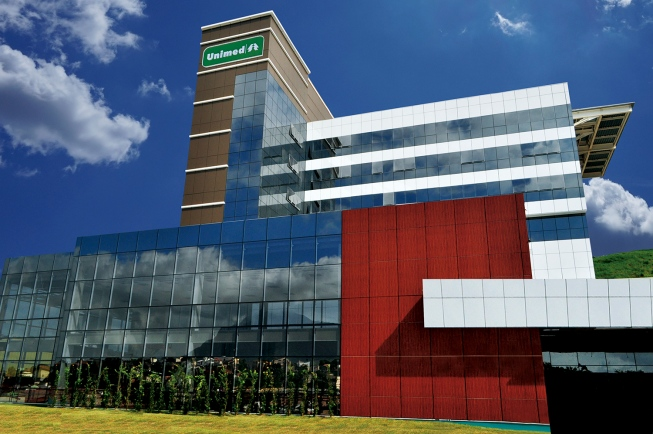
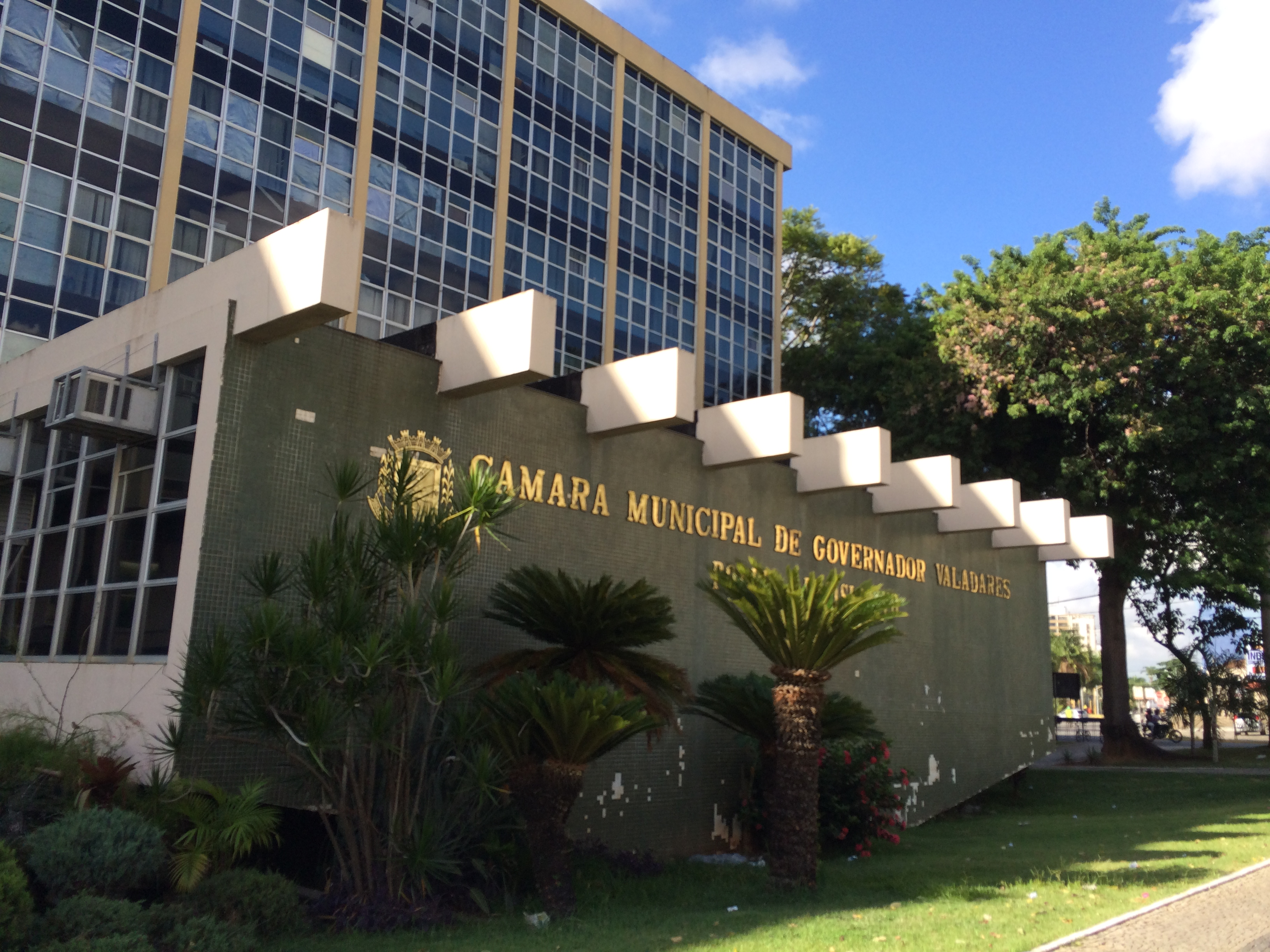
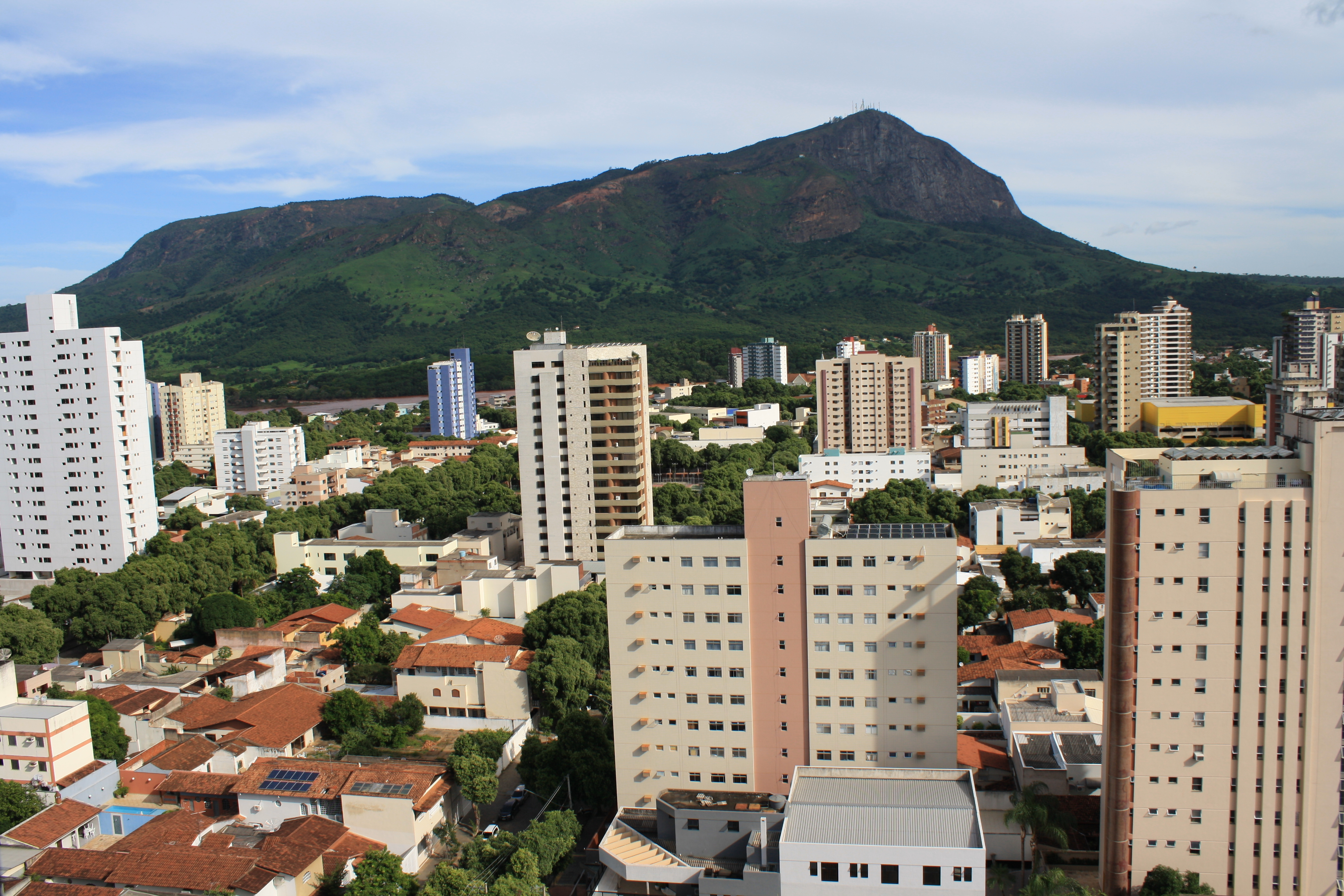
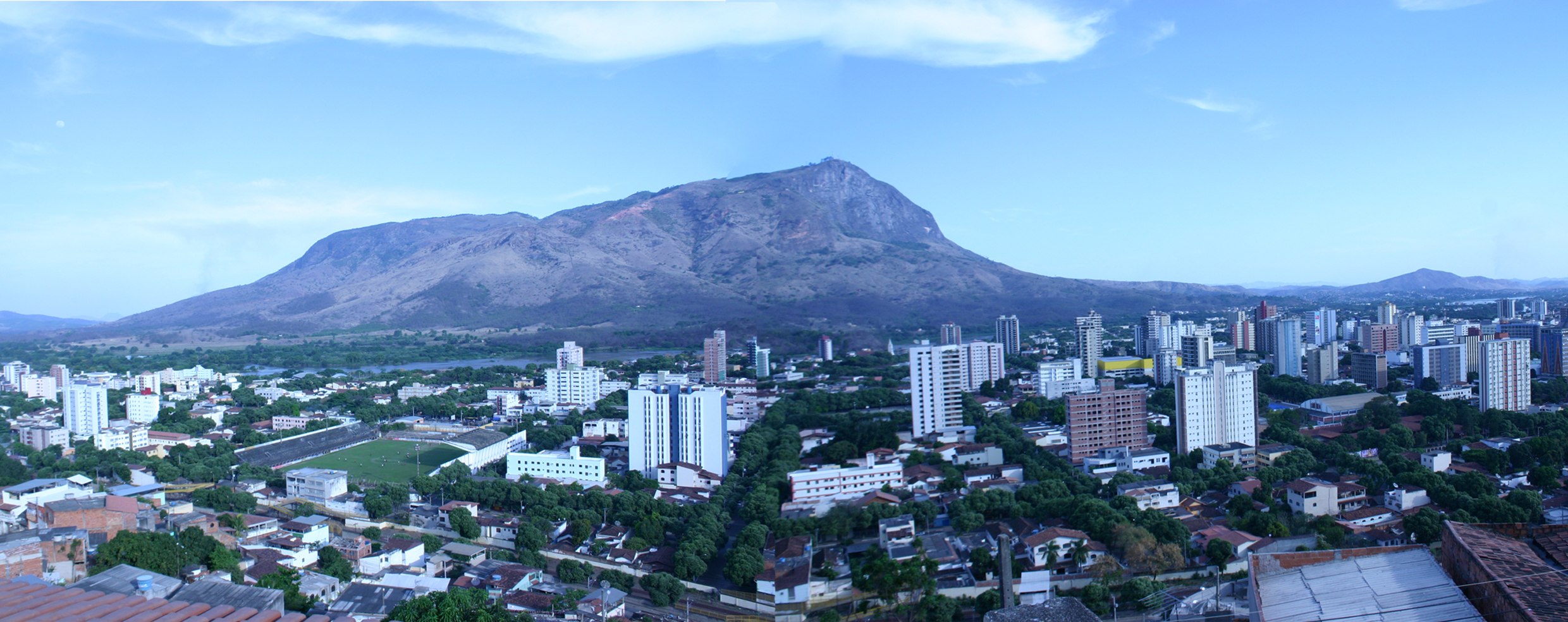
- Governador Valadares

- Flag Coat of arms
- Motto: Princesinha do Vale (Little Princess of the Valley)
- Location in the state of Minas Gerais

- Location within Brazil
- Coordinates: 18°51′03″S 41°56′56″W
- Country: Brazil
- State: Minas Gerais
- Region: Southeast
- Intermediate Region: Governador Valadares
- Immediate Region: Governador Valadares
- Founded: 30 January 1938
- Named for: Benedito Valadares Ribeiro

Government
  - Mayor: Sandro Lúcio Fonseca (PL)

Area
  - Total: 2,348.1 km^{2} (906.6 sq mi)
- Elevation: 170 m (560 ft)

Population (2022 Brazilian census)
  - Total: 257,171
  - Estimate (2025): 266,561
  - Density: 109.52/km^{2} (283.66/sq mi)
- Demonym: valadarense
- Time zone: UTC−3 (BRT)
- HDI (2010): 0.727 – high
- Website: www.valadares.mg.gov.br

Governador Valadares is a Brazilian municipality in the countryside of Minas Gerais. In 2025, its population was 266,561 inhabitants, thus being the ninth most populated city in the state. It is an economical axis of the middle valley of the Doce River (Rio Doce, lit. "Sweet River"), having a significant influence on the east and northeast portion of Minas Gerais and local authorities of the state of Espírito Santo. Governador Valadares sits on the bank of the Doce River (Rio Doce), 324 km from Belo Horizonte, the state's capital. Governador Valadares has an area of about 2 342 km^{2}, of which only 58 km^{2} is urban area.

The discovery of the city started at the beginning of the 16th century, that explored the Doce River searching for precious metals. The settlement began between the 18th and 19th centuries, constructing barracks destined to keep an eye at the Amerindians, who used to attack the settlers and merchants. With the construction of the EFVM (Vitória-Minas Railway), in 1907, the settlements were consolidated. The growth of the population and commercial development was improved due to the location of the city, that was near to coffee farms and wood extraction fields. The municipality was emancipated from Peçanha in the 1930s.

After the 1940s, the extraction of precious metals brought a notable population growth, along with livestock and commerce. However, with the decline of natural resources, the money could only be earned through the investment of immigrants, who would later go to other countries. Commerce is the most important source of income in the city, along with agribusiness and regional manufactured products.

== Geography ==
According to the modern (2017) geographic classification by Brazil's National Institute of Geography and Statistics (IBGE), the city is the main municipality in the Intermediate Geographic Region of Governador Valadares.

Until 2017, Governador Valadares was a statistical micro-region including 25 municipalities: Alpercata, Campanário, Capitão Andrade, Coroaci, Divino das Laranjeiras, Engenheiro Caldas, Fernandes Tourinho, Frei Inocêncio, Galiléia, Governador Valadares, Itambacuri, Itanhomi, Jampruca, Marilac, Mathias Lobato, Nacip Raydan, Nova Módica, Pescador, São Geraldo da Piedade, São Geraldo do Baixio, São José da Safira, São José do Divino, Sobrália, Tumiritinga, and Virgolândia. Its population (2006) was estimated by the IBGE to be 407,815 inhabitants in a total area of 11, 327 km^{2}.

=== Relief and hydrography ===
In general, the municipal territory is divided into two geomorphological units: 60% of the Valadares territory is undulating, 25% is rugged and 15% is flat. The areas to the south, where the urban perimeter is located, are located in the interplanal depression of the Rio Doce Valley, whose relief is the result of a river dissection that occurred in the Precambrian period and follows the course of the Doce River. This is a relatively flat region, with average altitudes ranging from 250 to 500 meters, with the presence of gentle hills, valleys, and excessive watercourses, and the highest altitudes are found in isolated steep elevations, in addition to the Pico da Ibituruna, which is 1,123 meters high and separated from the urban area by the Doce River. This unit is dominated by soils with schist, mica schist, biotite-gneiss, and quartz. The Uplifted Plateau/Mountainous Massif, in turn, corresponds to a region of rugged terrain to the north and northwest of the municipality. It is made up of steep valleys and crested hills that are on average 850 to 900 meters high, and soils with granite-gneiss, granites and biotite-gneiss can be found.

=== Climate ===
Temperature:

- Annual average: 32.6 °C (90.7 °F])
- Annual maximum average: 40.7 °C (105.3 °F)
- Annual minimum average: 18.3 °C (65 °F)

Average annual rainfall index: 1,350 mm

=== Climate ===
Climate data for Governador Valadares (1981–2010)
Month	Jan	Feb	Mar	Apr	May	Jun	Jul	Aug	Sep	Oct	Nov	Dec	Year
Mean daily maximum °C (°F)	32.2 (90.0)	33.2 (91.8)	32.2 (90.0)	30.7 (87.3)	28.7 (83.7)	27.9 (82.2)	27.8 (82.0)	28.6 (83.5)	29.7 (85.5)	30.9 (87.6)	30.8 (87.4)	31.2 (88.2)	30.3 (86.5)
Daily mean °C (°F)	26.5 (79.7)	26.6 (79.9)	26.1 (79.0)	24.8 (76.6)	22.5 (72.5)	21.1 (70.0)	20.9 (69.6)	21.9 (71.4)	23.7 (74.7)	25.0 (77.0)	25.8 (78.4)	25.9 (78.6)	24.2 (75.6)
Mean daily minimum °C (°F)	21.9 (71.4)	21.6 (70.9)	21.3 (70.3)	20.1 (68.2)	17.5 (63.5)	15.8 (60.4)	15.2 (59.4)	16.4 (61.5)	18.0 (64.4)	19.7 (67.5)	20.7 (69.3)	21.5 (70.7)	19.1 (66.4)
Average precipitation mm (inches)	173.0 (6.81)	83.5 (3.29)	113.0 (4.45)	48.8 (1.92)	23.1 (0.91)	13.6 (0.54)	8.0 (0.31)	13.6 (0.54)	33.9 (1.33)	69.8 (2.75)	170.4 (6.71)	234.9 (9.25)	985.6 (38.80)
Average precipitation days (≥ 1.0 mm)	10	7	9	5	3	2	2	2	3	6	11	14	74
Average relative humidity (%)	78.6	76.3	77.6	78.6	78.1	78.3	75.3	72.0	68.8	69.6	75.7	78.4	75.6
Mean monthly sunshine hours	196.4	188.5	187.1	177.4	161.6	157.8	168.0	178.3	145.0	145.4	128.7	138.9	1,973.1
Source: Instituto Nacional de Meteorologia

== History ==
=== Colonization of the region ===
Today's location of the municipality of Governador Valadares was found to be inhabited by Amerindians for at least 10 thousand years and registers from the first explorers of the region after Brazil's discovery, in 1500, provides us information that they were still numerous on that occasion. The exploration of this region began in the 16th century, with expeditions like the ones from Sebastião Fernandes Tourinho, that went by the Rio Doce route in the search for precious metals. Fernandes Tourinho went through the inverse route of the river until finding the Santo Antônio River, but the settlement was prohibited in the beginning of the 17th century, due to the efforts to not having ways to have illegal gold extraction on the Diamantina, Minas Gerais region.

The settlement was allowed on 1755 and to guarantee to safety of the colonizers and merchants that used the Doce River, barracks were installed with the mission to keep an eye on the Botocudos. The barrack of Baguari was the first territory of today's municipality and along with him, near settlements also appeared, one of them being Figueira, that correspond to today's municipality. The Amerindians were seen as a threat to the colonizers and the barracks worked as a strategy of forcing them to leave the region. Near Figueira, in 1818, the D.Manoel barrack was created, on the left side of the Doce River, working as a little port that attended to military service and would also form a trading post. Later, the settlement was ranked up to a district subjected to Peçanha by the provincial law nº 3.198 of September 23 of 1884, coming to be called Santo Antônio da Figueira.

==== General information ====
The area around Governador Valadares was explored in colonial serve the residences of the town. It was powered by steam.

- 1923 – Figueira

In 1937, the municipality of Figueira do Rio Doce was established, which then changed its name to Governador Valadares, in honor of the governor at the time, Benedito Valadares.

Since the 1980s, Governador Valadares is known as one of the main sources of Brazilian immigrants to the United States, even earning the nickname "Governador Valadolares" in reference to expatriates sending remittances of their dollar salaries. However, the late 2000s recession made many of the Valadares immigrants to return home since financial security became worse in the United States.

== Economy ==
Production and the intense trade in precious stones is the reason the "Brazil Gem Show" takes place in the local authority every year: an event that consists of the commerce of precious stones with Brazilians and foreign visitors

Governador Valadares is the biggest city and commercial center of the Eastern region of the state of Minas Gerais, having several cities in its area of influence, such as Teófilo Otoni and Caratinga. At present, Governador Valadares is growing in industrial development, due to its strategic position, human resources and international reputation.

It is a trade and industrial center. Sawmills and food-processing plants are in the city, and mica and beryl are mined in the area. Governador Valadares is one of the most famous gem-trading centres in Brazil. Gem minerals include amethyst, chrysoberyl, brazilianite, topaz and quartz. The Golconda mine, one of the oldest in the city, attracts the curiosity of tourists and stone collectors from all over the world.

== Transportation ==
The city is served by the railroad Vitória-Minas, of Vale S.A. and by the highway Rio-Bahia (BR-116). It is also connected with the capital of the state by the BR-381.

The city is on the Belo Horizonte–Vitória railway and on the Rio de Janeiro–Salvador highway. Distances from major centers:

- Belo Horizonte – 311 km
- Rio de Janeiro – 580 km
- São Paulo – 891 km
- Brasília – 1,045 km
- Vitória – 420 km

== Sport ==
The city hosts of one of the stages of the Brazilian hang gliding championship from the peak of Ibituruna, where it is possible to catch sight of the whole valley of Rio Doce. It also hosts several international hang gliding championships.

The city is known internationally for the World Paragliding Championships that has been held at Ibituruna Peak (1123 meters).

== Neighborhoods ==
- Vila Imperio

== Sister cities ==
Governador Valadares is twinned with the following cities:

- Framingham, Massachusetts, United States
- Everett, Massachusetts, United States
- Newark, New Jersey, United States
- Bridgeport, Connecticut, United States

== Notable people ==
- Warlley Alves, MMA fighter
- Eike Batista, entrepreneur
- Geraldão, football player
- Lucas Venuto, football player
- Yasmim, football player

== Gallery ==
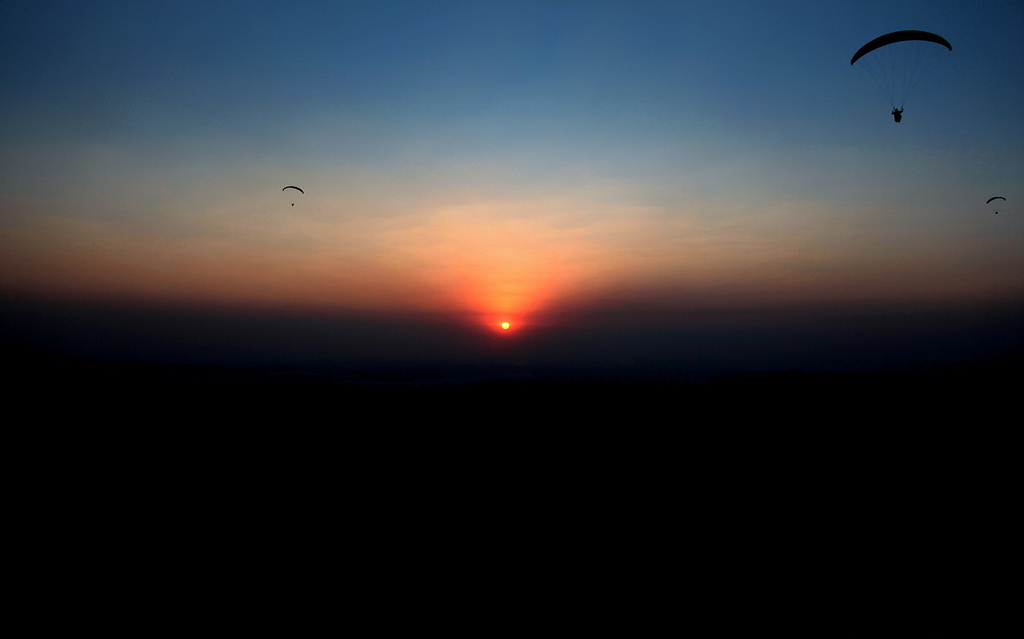
Sunset in Governador Valadares

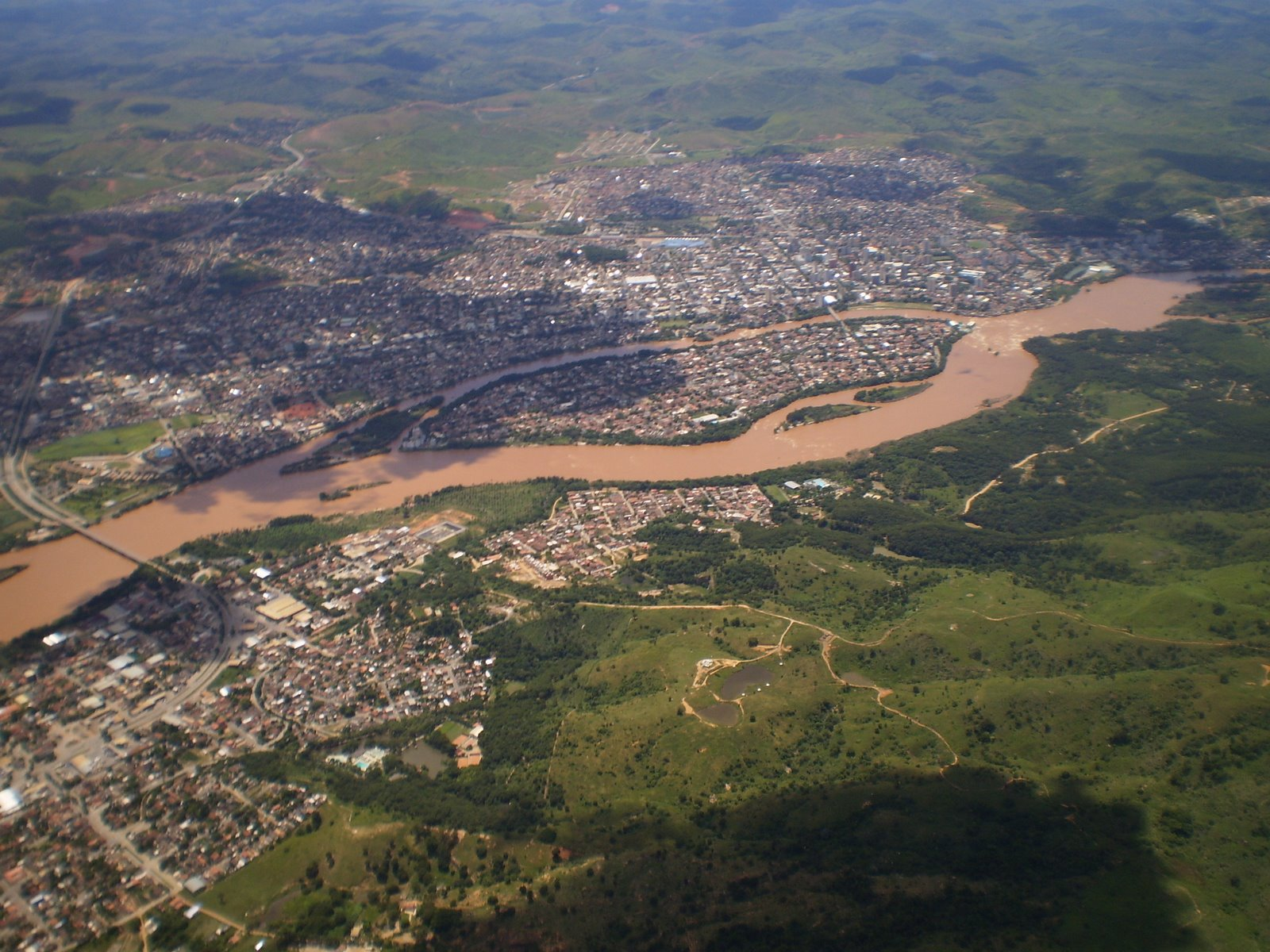
view of the city from above

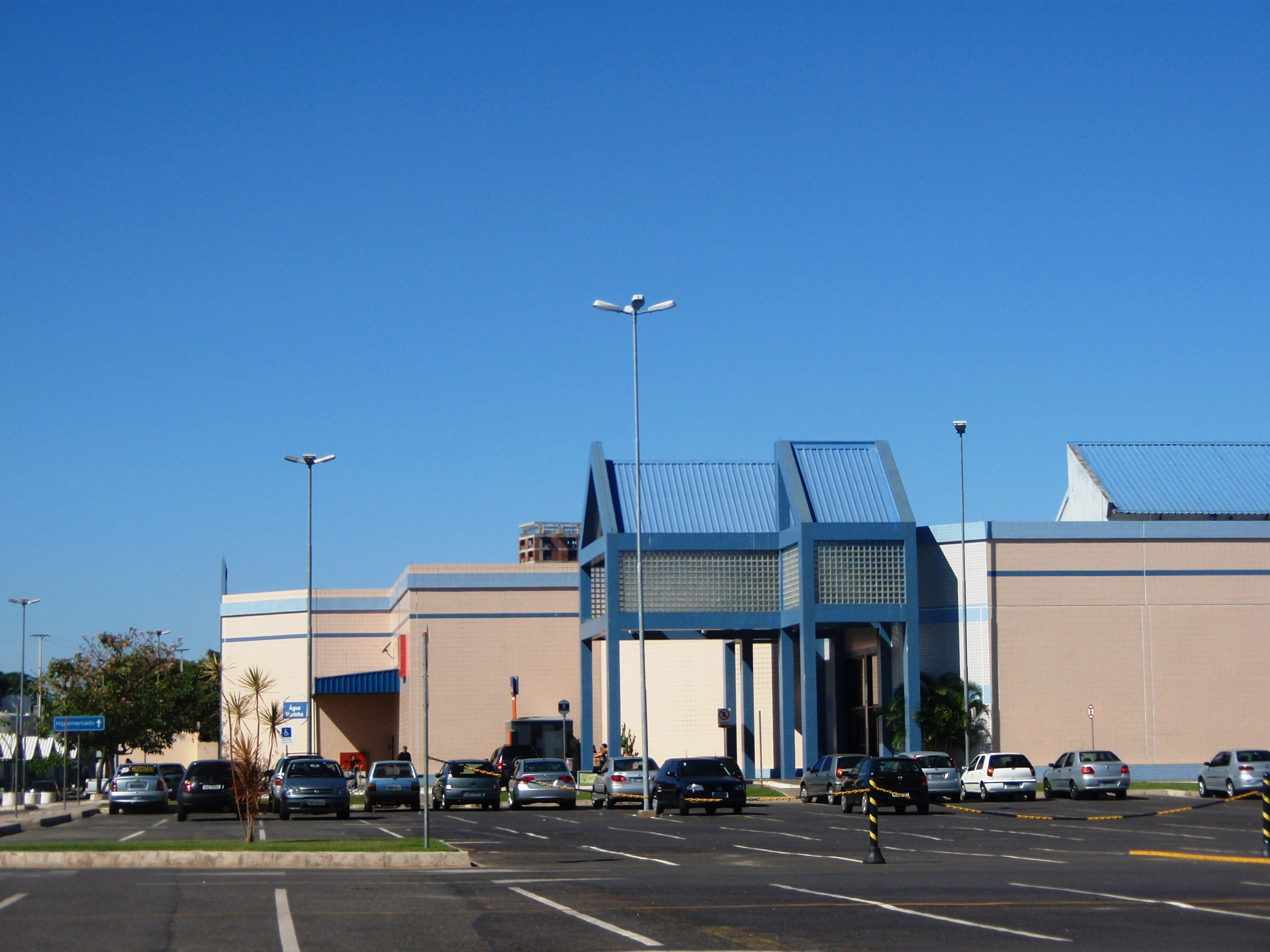
Shopping mall

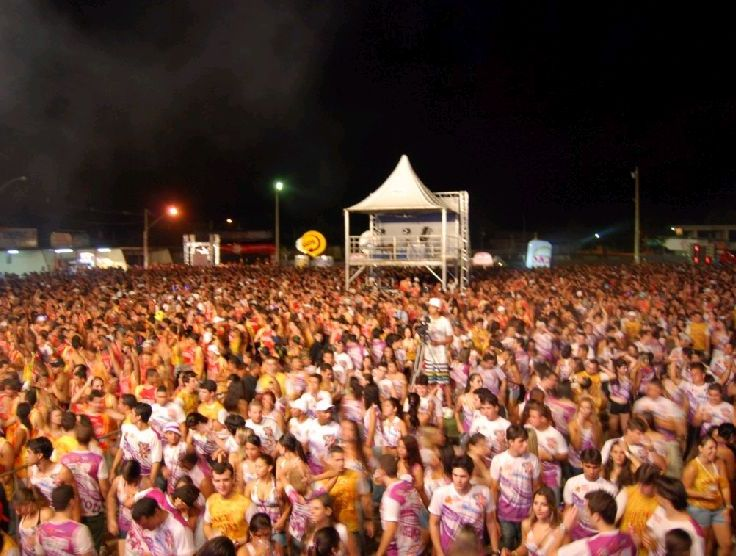
Carnival

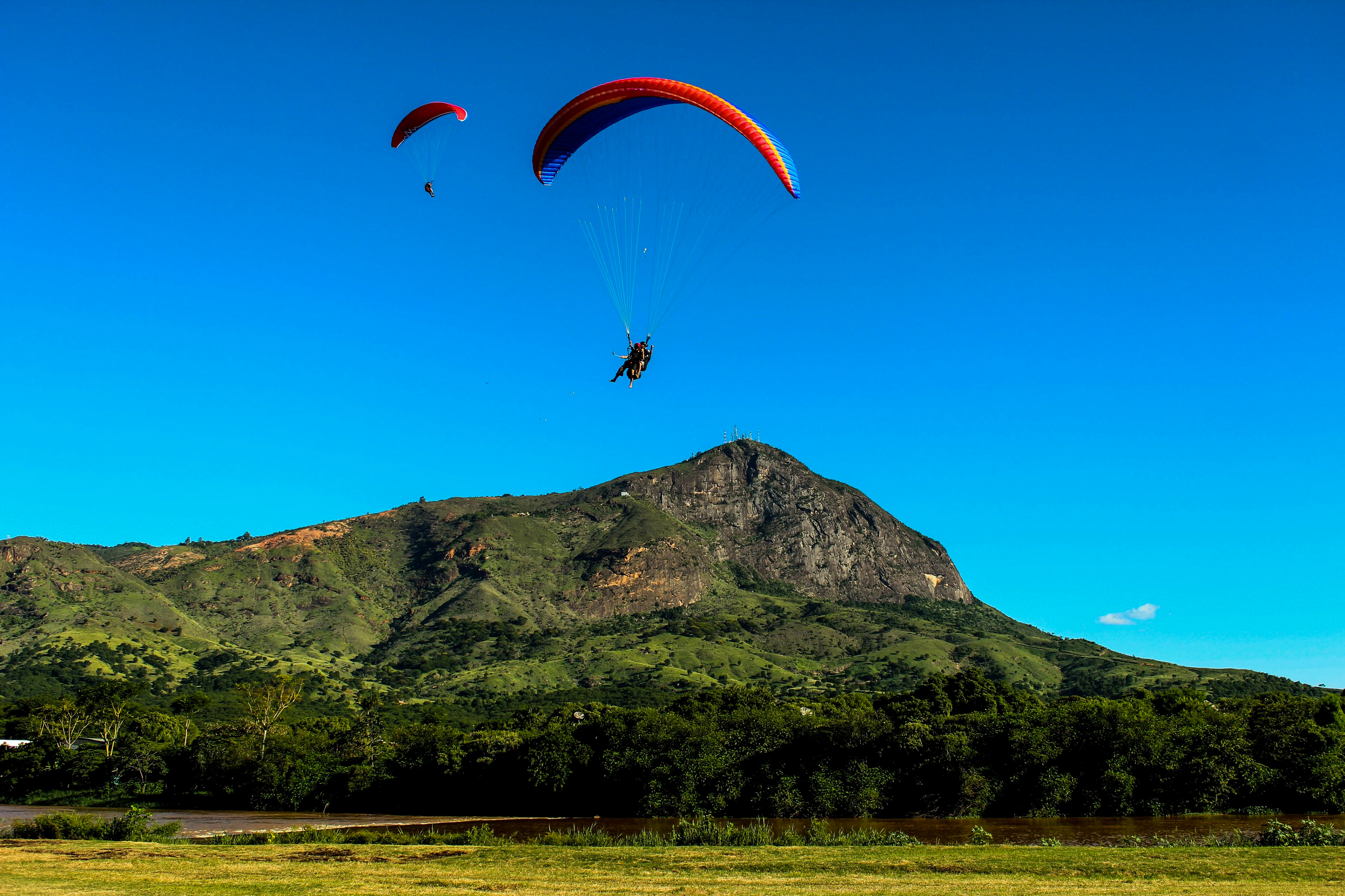
Paragliding, the main sport of the city

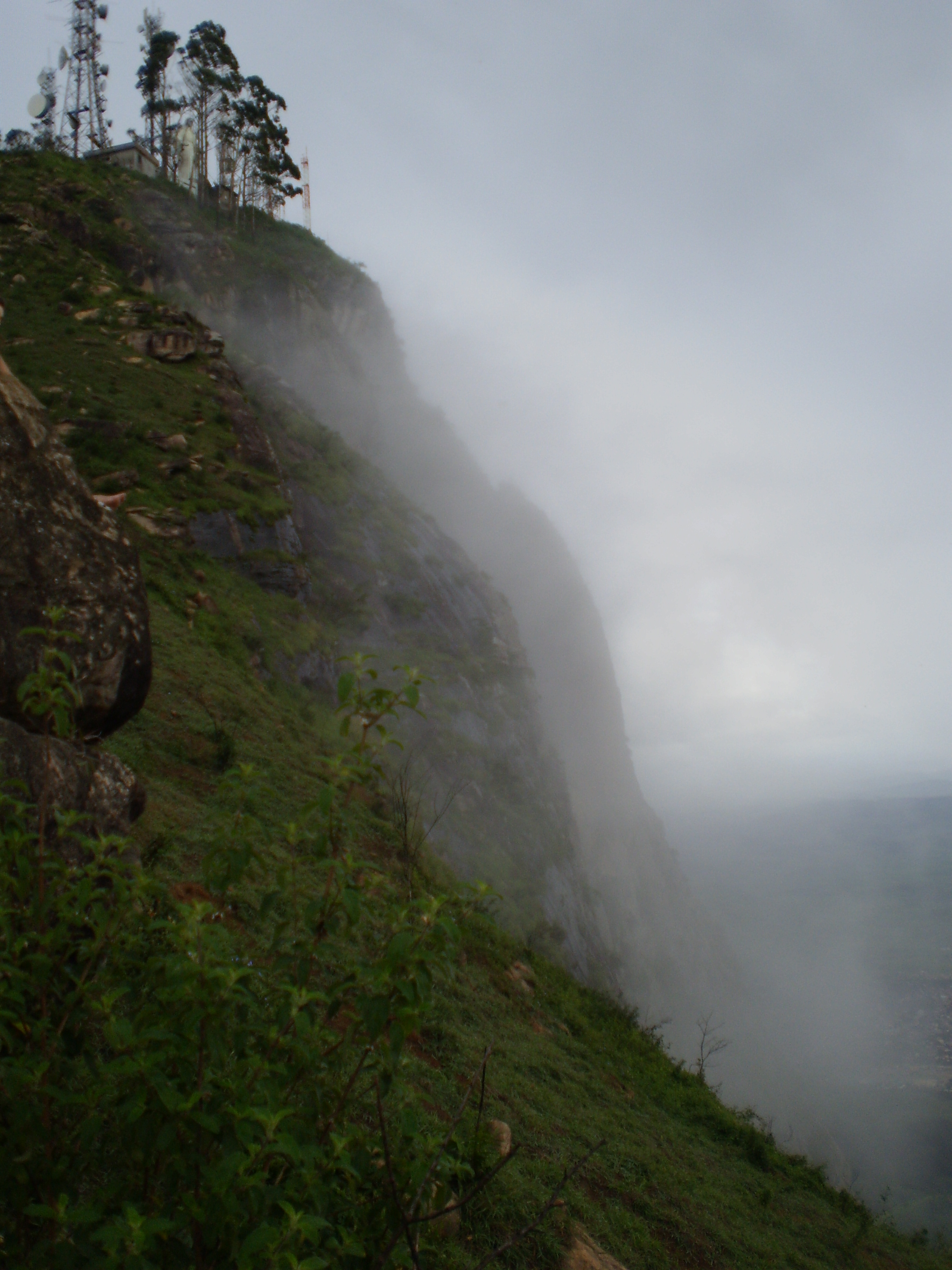
Top of the Ibituruna mountain

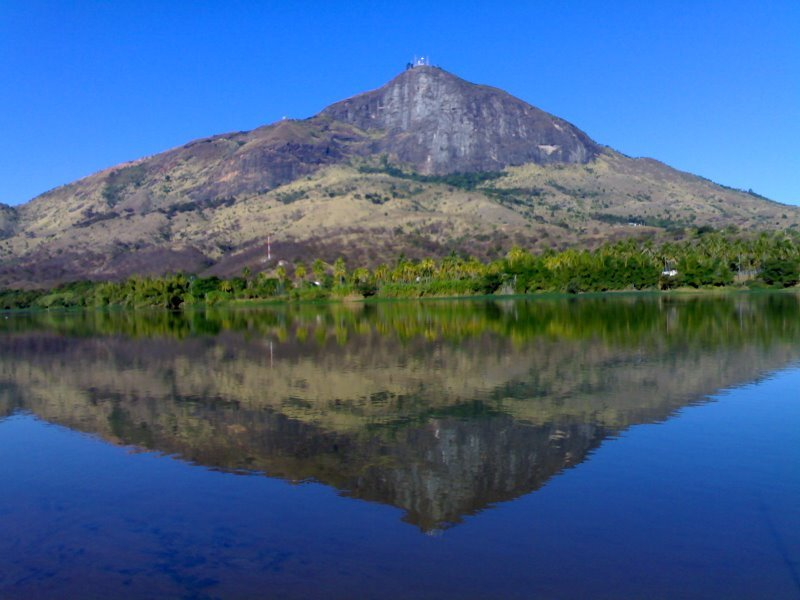
Ibituruna mountain reflection on Rio Doce river

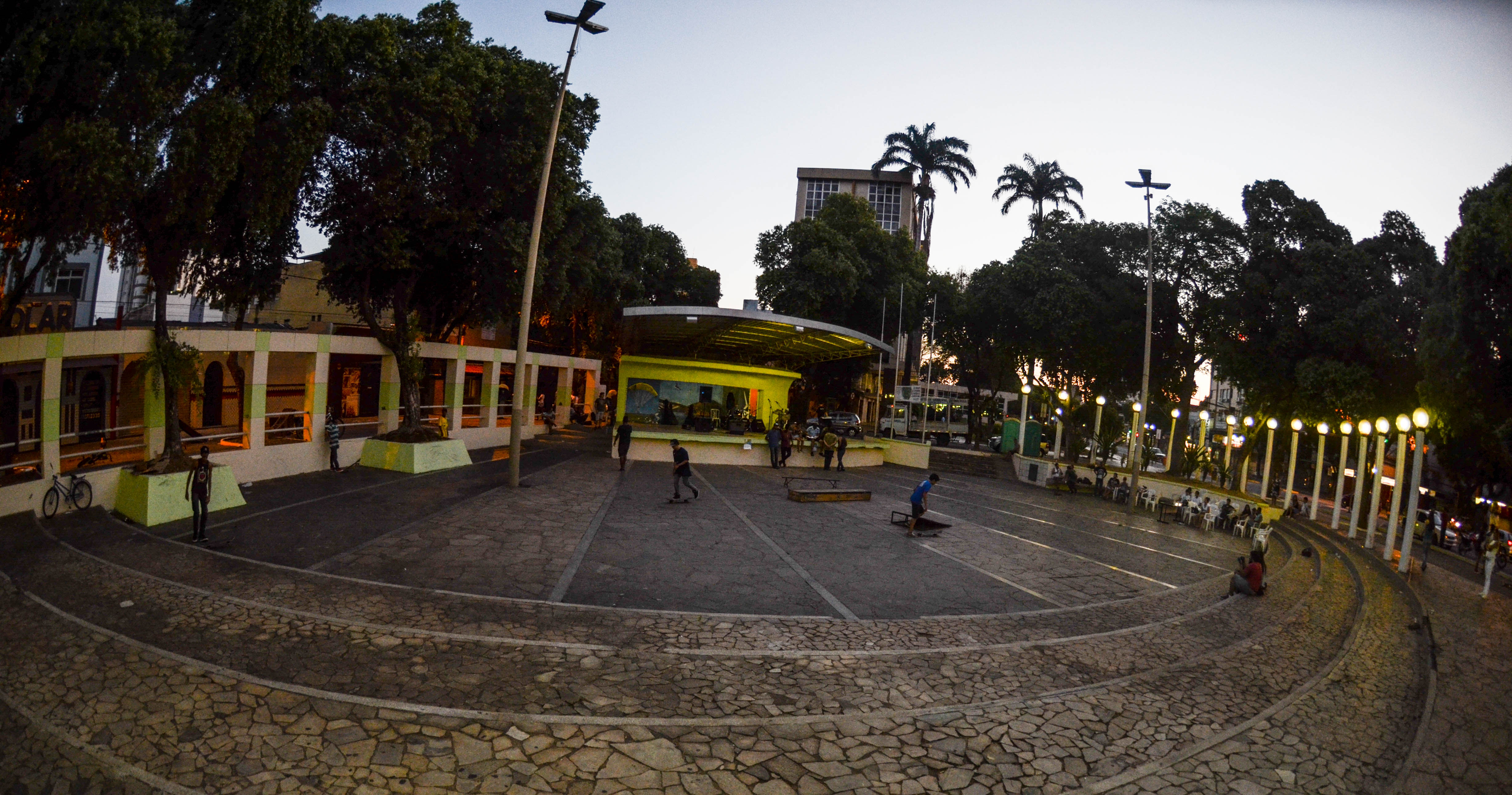
Downtown

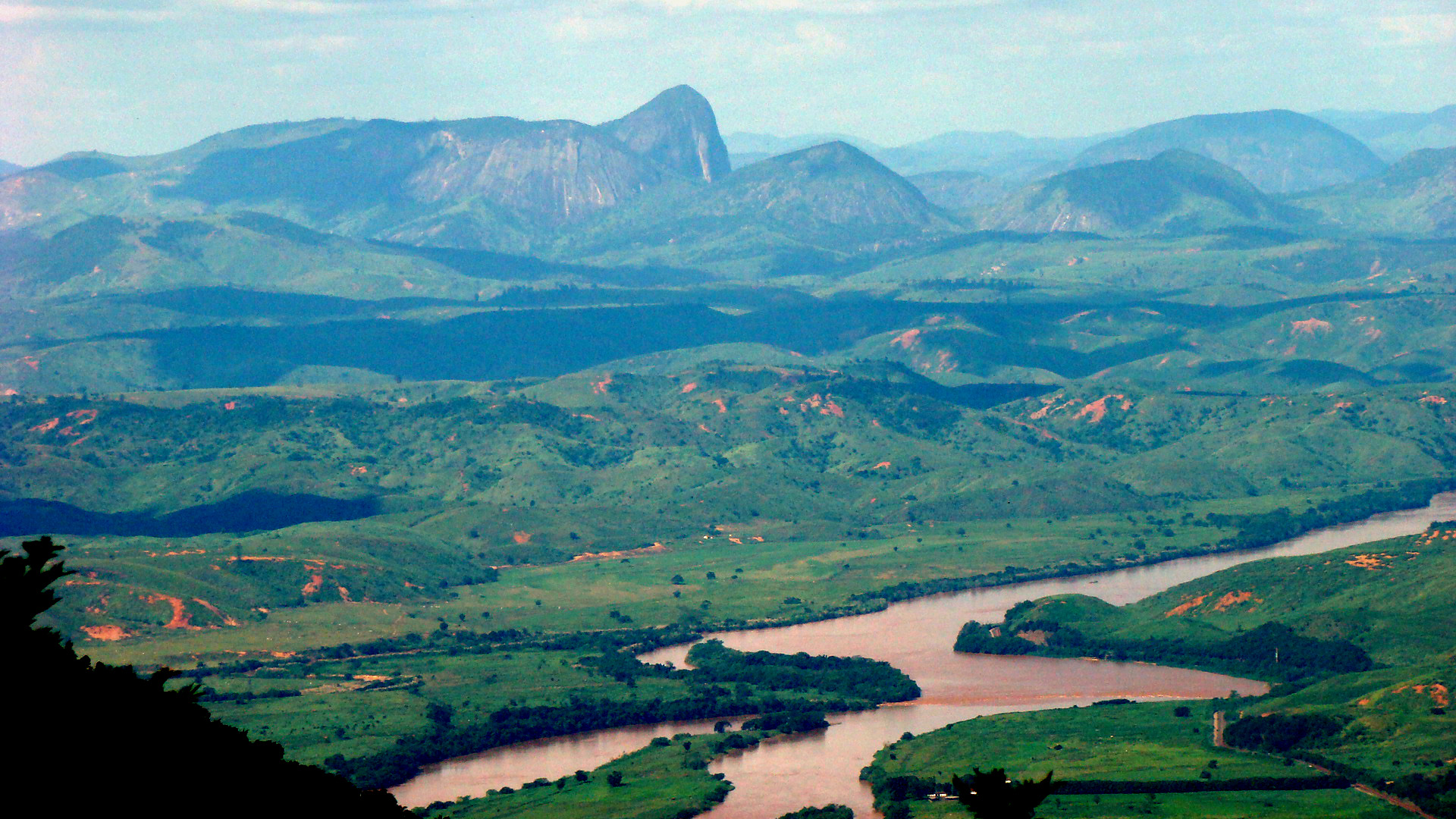
Rio Doce

== See also ==
- List of municipalities in Minas Gerais
