= Coroaci =

Brazilian municipality located in the northeast of the state of Minas Gerais

Coordinates: 18°37′19″S 42°17′09″W

- Municipality
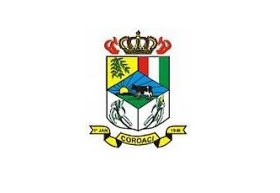
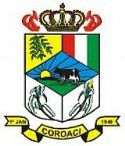
- Flag Coat of arms
- Interactive map of Coroaci
- Country: Brazil
- State: Minas Gerais
- Region: Southeast

Population (2022 Census)
  - Total: 10,884
  - Estimate (2025): 11,240
- Time zone: UTC−3 (BRT)

Location of Coroaci on a map of the state of Minas Gerais

Coroaci is a Brazilian municipality located in the east of the state of Minas Gerais. Its population in 2010 was 11,240 people living in a total area of 576 km^{2} (222 sq mi). The city belongs to the meso-region of Vale do Rio Doce and to the micro-region of Governador Valadares. It became a municipality in 1949.

== Geography ==
The city center of Coroaci is located at an elevation of 268 meters in the valley of the Suaçui River. Neighboring municipalities are Nacip Raydan and Virgolândia (N), Matias Lobato and Governador Valadares (S and E) and Peçanha (W).

=== Distances ===
- Belo Horizonte: 420 km (south on BR-116 to Governador Valadares, then southwest on BR-341)
- Governador Valadares: 68 km southwest on MG-314 and BR-259
- Peçanha: 45 km east on MG-314
- Sardoá: 50 km southwest on MG-314 and BR-259.

== Economic activities ==
Services and agriculture are the main economic activities. The GDP in 2005 was approximately R$32 million, with 21 million reais from services, 4 million reais from industry, and 7 million reais from agriculture. There were 487 rural producers on 30,000 hectares of land (2006). Approximately 1,450 persons were employed in agriculture. The main crops are sugarcane, beans, and corn. There were 19,000 head of cattle, of which 4,500 were milk cows (2006). Only 22 of the rural properties had tractors in 2006.

There was only one bank (2007). In the vehicle fleet there were 258 automobiles, 34 trucks, 46 pickup trucks, 8 buses, and 568 motorcycles (2007).

== Health and education ==
In the health sector there were 4 health clinics and 1 private hospital with 25 beds (2005). Educational needs of 2,800 students were met by 11 primary schools, 3 middle schools, and 2 pre-primary schools.

- Municipal Human Development Index: 0.699 (2000)
- State ranking: 550 out of 853 municipalities as of 2000
- National ranking: 3,010 out of 5,138 municipalities as of 2000
- Literacy rate: 81%
- Life expectancy: 68 years
- Per capital monthly income: R$139.00

In 2000 the per capita monthly income of R$139.00 was below the state average of R$276.00 and below the national average of R$297.00. Poços de Caldas had the highest per capita monthly income in the state in 2000 with R$435.00. The lowest was in the state was Setubinha with R$73.00.

The highest ranking municipality in Minas Gerais in 2000 was Poços de Caldas with 0.841, while the lowest was Setubinha with 0.568. Nationally the highest was São Caetano do Sul in São Paulo with 0.919, while the lowest was Setubinha. In more recent statistics (considering 5,507 municipalities) Manari in the state of Pernambuco has the lowest rating in the country—0,467—putting it in last place.

== See also ==
- List of municipalities in Minas Gerais
