= 1985 hailstorm in eastern Minas Gerais =

- Native name: Chuva de granizo no leste de Minas Gerais em 1985
- Date: September 30, 1985
- Location: Rio Doce and Mucuri valleys, in Minas Gerais, Brazil, Itabirinha (which suffered the most damage)
- Type: Natural disaster, hailstorm
- Deaths: 22
- Property damage: Thousands of houses damaged, dozens of homes completely destroyed and 50% of Itabirinha's coffee crop lost

The 1985 hailstorm in eastern Minas Gerais was a hailstorm and heavy rainfall event that severely affected areas of the Rio Doce and Mucuri valleys, in the countryside of Minas Gerais, on September 30, 1985. The municipality of Itabirinha, then called Itabirinha de Mantena, was the most affected. It had about 10,000 inhabitants in 1985, of which 4,000 were left homeless. Twenty victims and six hundred wounded were registered in this town alone.

The storm in Itabirinha, with hailstones weighing up to 2.2 pounds (1 kilogram), lasted about fifteen minutes, enough to affect more than 50% of the residences in the urban center, including 1,800 damaged houses and fifty completely destroyed. In the rural area, 50% of the municipality's coffee crop was lost. In Ipatinga, in the Vale do Aço (Steel Valley), the hailstorm caused two deaths and material damage. The regions of Teófilo Otoni and Mantena also registered storms.

== History ==
On the afternoon of September 30, 1985, multiple areas in the Rio Doce and Mucuri valleys registered severe storms. In Ipatinga, hail accompanied by gusts of wind, lightning, and flooding caused two deaths, the destruction of houses and cars, as well as landslides. According to the Civil Defense, other regions hit by storms were Mantena and Teófilo Otoni. However, the most affected locality that day was the municipality of Itabirinha, where the hail storm reached severe proportions and with subsequent international repercussions, with ice stones weighing up to one kilogram.

The daily total precipitation on October 1, at a Mineral Resources Research Company measuring point in Ataléia (a neighboring municipality), was 79.0 mm. In addition to the water from the heavy rain, the ice that melted in the following days raised the level of some of the watercourses in the municipality, causing new floods. The hailstorm lasted between fifteen and twenty minutes and was enough to affect 50% to 70% of the homes in the urban area of Itabirinha. There were reports of 1,800 houses damaged and fifty destroyed. Of the 10,000 inhabitants, approximately 4,000 were left homeless, 600 were injured, and 20 died. Some of the victims were found in the following days frozen, trapped between broken furniture, and in the debris of the houses. Others were simply buried by the layer of ice, which reached almost 5 feet (1.5 meters). Initial estimates by the Civil Defense indicated that the death toll could reach 40.

The city hall, police headquarters, schools, and the city hotel were also damaged. In the rural area of Itabirinha, about 50% of the coffee harvest, the main economic activity of the municipality, was lost, the equivalent of 800,000 sacks. According to the then mayor Clóvis de Castro, 150,000 coffee trees were destroyed. The water and electricity supply, and telecommunication services were interrupted throughout the city and 24 hours later had still not been restored. On October 4, excessive ice on the streets caused the Fire Department to suspend the search for two bodies that were still missing. By then, eighteen victims had been confirmed.

By October 5, 100 cases of pneumonia and six cases of typhus were reported at the São Lucas Hospital, which, despite having also been damaged, had already received more than 1,200 patients. The medicine stocks almost ran out, but the visit of state health secretary Raimundo Resende on the 5th ensured the transfer of medicines and necessary vaccines. Heavy rains continued to hit eastern Minas Gerais in the first days of October, but sunny weather predominated in Itabirinha from the 3rd, contributing to the melting of the ice and cleaning up. According to the Civil Defense, 15 tractors and 80 trucks were engaged in cleaning the city. On day 6, the process of clearing the roads was not yet completed and there were still blocks of ice near the rivers.

== Help and repercussion ==
The day after the tragedy in Itabirinha on October 1, shipments of food, medicine, tents, mattresses, and power generators began to arrive, much of it brought by two trucks from Governador Valadares and the Fundo Especial de Calamidade Pública da Defesa Civil ("state Civil Defense Special Public Calamity Fund"). Doctors, military, and firemen from neighboring cities Mantena and Governador Valadares were also called to Itabirinha. Drinking water was supplied by tanker trucks from the Fire Department and the Departamento de Estradas de Rodagem ("Department of Roads"), which was carrying out works in the region, at the request of the Civil Defense. Most of the homeless were taken to churches and schools, 100 of them to the Itabirense Commercial College, which had to be covered with tarps due to the damage. On October 2, a state of emergency was decreed, and Cr$ 1 billion was granted by Interior Minister Ronaldo Costa Couto for victim assistance. A checkings account was also opened at Banco do Brasil to collect donations.

According to the then National Weather Service, the absence of meteorological equipment at that time made the storm unpredictable. The closest monitoring station was located in Rio de Janeiro, and it was not possible to reach the most affected locations. The chief of the 5th Meteorological District, Luiz Ladeira, stated that these were "localized" meteorological phenomena and that he could not give further explanations due to the lack of monitoring in these areas. However, isolated and rapid storms are not uncommon at this time of year in the region, marking the beginning of the rainy season. Despite the episode, which had national and international repercussion, the municipality recovered with the passage of time. September 30 was decreed as an optional day off for some years, in memory of the victims.
