= Alpercata =

Brazilian municipality located in the northeast of the state of Minas Gerais

Coordinates: 18°58′49″S 41°58′58″W

- Municipality
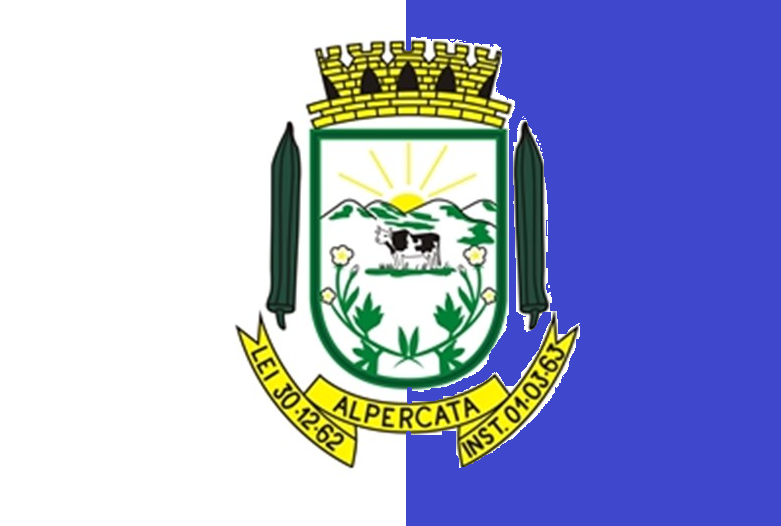
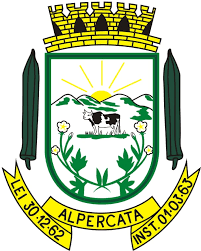
- Flag Coat of arms
- Interactive map of Alpercata
- Country: Brazil
- State: Minas Gerais
- Region: Southeast

Population (2022 Census)
  - Total: 6,903
  - Estimate (2025): 7,019
- Time zone: UTC−3 (BRT)

Location of Alpercata on a map of the state of Minas Gerais

Alpercata is a Brazilian municipality located in the northeast of the state of Minas Gerais. Its population as of 2025 was 7,019 people living in a total area of 167 km^{2}. The city belongs to the meso-region of Vale do Rio Doce and to the micro-region of Governador Valadares. It became a municipality in 1962.

== Geography ==
The city center of Alpercata is located at an elevation of 192 meters on the important federal highway BR-116 just south of Governador Valadares. Neighboring municipalities are: Governador Valadares (W and N), Tumiritinga (NE), Capitão Andrade, Engenheiro Caldas, and Fernandes Tourinho (S), and Sobrália (SW).

Distances

- Belo Horizonte: 330 km (north on BR-116 to Governador Valadares, then southwest on BR)
- Governador Valadares: 13 km north on BR-116
- Engenheiro Caldas: 34 km south on BR-116

== Economic activities ==
Services and small industries are the main economic activities. The GDP in 2005 was approximately R$31 million, with 17 million reais from services, 7 million reais from industry, and 3 million reais from agriculture. There were 245 rural producers on 9,000 hectares of land (2006). Approximately 1,000 persons were occupied in agriculture. The main crops are coffee, sugarcane, rice, beans, and corn. There were 18,000 head of cattle, of which 3,600 were milk cows (2006). Only 13 of the rural properties had tractors in 2006.

Of the working force there were 147 workers in 14 small industries, 169 workers in 86 retail units, and 266 workers in public administration (2006).

There were no banks (2007) In the vehicle fleet there were 314 automobiles, 48 trucks, 33 pickup trucks, 4 buses, and 169 motorcycles (2007).

== Health and education ==
In the health sector there were 5 health establishments, which included 4 public health clinics, and 1 private clinic (2005). Educational needs of 1,600 students were met by 8 primary schools, 1 middle school, and 4 pre-primary schools.

- Municipal Human Development Index: 0.702 (2000)
- State ranking: 533 out of 853 municipalities as of 2000
- National ranking: 2,952 out of 5,138 municipalities as of 2000
- Literacy rate: 78%
- Life expectancy: 70 (average of males and females)

In 2000 the per capita monthly income of R$148.00 was below the state average of R$276.00 and below the national average of R$297.00. Poços de Caldas had the highest per capita monthly income in 2000 with R$435.00. The lowest was Setubinha with R$73.00.

The highest ranking municipality in Minas Gerais in 2000 was Poços de Caldas with 0.841, while the lowest was Setubinha with 0.568. Nationally the highest was São Caetano do Sul in São Paulo with 0.919, while the lowest was Setubinha. In more recent statistics (considering 5,507 municipalities) Manari in the state of Pernambuco has the lowest rating in the country—0,467—putting it in last place.

== See also ==
- List of municipalities in Minas Gerais
