= Vila Império =

Urbanized settlement in Brazil

- Neighborhood of Brazil
- Bairro Vila Império: (English: Neighborhood of Vila Império)
- Large home in the Vila Império

- Map of the Vila Império

- Location in Minas Gerais Vila Império (Brazil)
- Coordinates: 18°53′07″S 41°58′26″W
- Country: Brazil
- State: Minas Gerais
- Municipality/City: Governador Valadares
- District: Região XVII (Region 17)

Area
  - Total: 0.3 km^{2} (0.12 sq mi)
- Demonym: Vila-Impériense
- CEP code: 35050-560, 35050-790, 35050-580, 35050-590, 35050-600, 35050-610
- Official language: Portuguese

Vila Império (Note: The official name of the neighborhood is "Vila Império" but will be commonly used and said outside of Brazil as "Vila Imperio".) (Portuguese pronunciation: [ˈvilɐˈĩ.pɛ.ɾi.u] VILUH-IM-PÉ-RIO; English: Imperial Village), officially known as the Bairro Vila Império (English: Neighborhood of Vila Império) is an urbanized neighborhood (bairro) in the Brazilian municipality of Governador Valadares, Minas Gerais, Brazil. This neighborhood is located on the western side of Governador Valadares, with Avenida Pecuarista Carlos Machado Rangel and Rua Crisolino Ferreira da Costa as the neighborhood's main thoroughfares and Rua Joaquim Pereira Duarte as its largest street. Vila Império is located on what is called Region XVII in Governador Valadares, shared with a large group of other neighborhoods across the western half of the city.

Vila Império and the region in which it is in across the Doce River, was once inhabited by Borun Indians, whose communities have diminished over time.

The neighborhood along with a tiny portion of smaller adjacent neighborhood, Castanheiras are home to Memorial Park Cemitério Jardim (English: Cemetery Garden Memorial Park) a cemetery-memorial park in the southern portion of it which is the neighborhood's primary attraction. Vila Império is also home to several shops and borders the municipality's airport, Governador Valadares Airport.

== History ==
=== Colonization of the region ===
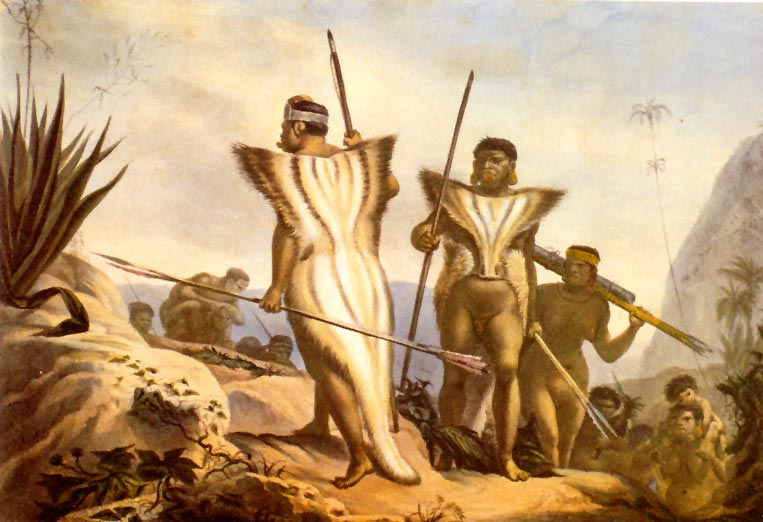
The Borun, the indigenous people of the area where the neighborhood now is.

The region of the neighborhood of Vila Império had been inhabited by indigenous people for an estimated 10,000 years, and records from the first explorers of the region after the "discovery" of Brazil in 1500 indicate that they were still numerous at that time. The exploration of the area began in the 16th century, in expeditions such as that of Sebastião Fernandes Tourinho, who followed the course of the Doce River in search of precious metals on its banks. Tourinho followed the reverse path of the Doce River until he reached the Santo Antônio River. However, settlement of the region was prohibited at the beginning of the 17th century in order to prevent smuggling of gold extracted in the Diamantina region.

The settlement was liberated in 1755 and to guarantee the safety of settlers and traders who sailed along the Doce River, barracks were set up to monitor the Borun. Boruns were the indigenous people who inhabited the Doce River valley (called Watu by them) and its tributary, the Piracicaba River, in the region where municipalities such as Ipatinga, Timóteo, Jaguaraçu and Marliéria are located today.

=== Foundation ===
While there are no records or information on the exact foundation of the neighborhood. It was most likely founded in the 1970s or 80s during the westward expansion of the municipality.

=== Name ===
The name "Vila Império" translates to "Imperial Village" in Portuguese. Formerly, in Roman times and then in the Middle Ages, the term "Vila" (Meaning "village") had the connotation of country or solar residence as it is still today. The term's variant "Villa" is also used in the Spanish, Italian, French, German and Norwegian languages. The second term "Império" (meaning "Empire") and originating from the Latin word "imperium" is a connotation of something relevant, important or with great grandeur.

== Geography ==
=== Borders ===
The neighborhood of Vila Império has a total area of 0.3 km^{2} and is bordered by other smaller neighborhoods such as São Cristóvão (Saint Christopher) which takes up most of its eastern border along the streets of Rua Joaquim Pereira Duarte, Rua B, Rua C etc. However, in its west the neighborhood, Castanheiras (Chestnut trees) has the neighborhoods largest border which interlocks at the Cemetery Garden Memorial Park shared between the two. Lastly the neighborhood shares its northern border with the neighborhood of Sagrada Familia (Holy Family) which enters the neighborhood via Rua Joaquim Pereira Duarte.

=== Roads ===
Vila Império consists of 24 roads shared between it and other neighborhoods and other roads that are located already inside the neighborhood, these roads are the ones which form and created the urbanization of the neighborhood. The neighborhood can be accessed by the roads: Rua Joaquim Pereira Duarte in the north, Avenida Getúlio Vargas in the southeast and Avenida Pecuarista Carlos Machado Rangel in between the west and the east parts of the neighborhood.

=== Terrain ===
Vila Império constitutes the only green area of the inner parts of the municipality of Governador Valadares. This specific area is found at the Cemetery Garden Memorial Park shared between Vila Império and the neighborhood of Castanheiras.

=== Climate ===
The climate of the municipality, neighborhood and the overall area is primarily hot "semi-humid" tropical, with an average annual temperature of 24 °C and average rainfall of 990 mm/year, concentrated between the months of October and March. The rainy season comprises the hottest months, while the dry season encompasses the warmer months. autumn and spring. Precipitation falls mainly in the form of rain and sporadically, hail, which may also be accompanied by electrical discharges, large blackouts, and strong wind gusts.

=== Rua Joaquim Pereira Duarte confusions ===
A part of the Rua Joaquim Pereira Duarte (shown in teal) and labeled "Rua Joaquim Duarte" as it borders adjacent São Cristóvão.

Rua Joaquim Pereira Duarte (English: Joaquim Pereira Duarte Road) formally known as Rua A (A Street) is the Vila Império's largest and most populous road out of all the 24 roads within the neighborhood. The road consists of four non-adjacent and unconnected sides, a rare phenomenon in geography especially for roads internationally. The first side of the road is more urbanized as it houses a large condominium which dominates the entire part. The other part however is even more populated and more urbanized. The other two parts however are small, with around one to ten homes within them while being fully separated from the two mainland parts of the road.

==== Urbanized/border part ====
The primary and most known part of the Rua Joaquim Pereira Duarte is the part of it as it borders the São Cristóvão neighborhood. This part of the road is the main section of it used to show the road on maps, such as when it is accessed upon in Google Maps. This section is also home to nearly 300 homes, having a church and several shops within which fully contribute to the urbanization of the neighborhood of which the road is in, the Vila Império.

== Happenings ==
=== 2010s ===
==== 2019 water problems ====
On the day 13 June 2019, a re-establishment and repairing of the waters of the municipality of Governador Valadares conducted by the SAAE (Serviço Autônomo de Água e Esgoto) created an interruption and affected the water being transferred across to over 100 neighborhoods of the city including the Vila Império.

=== 2020s ===
==== 2020 Rua D fire ====
On 14 October 2020, a fire started in the basement of one of the houses in the neighborhood's street, Rua D. The fire department of the municipality was called towards the situation and conveyed that no one was injured in it, which was televised statewide by TV Globo Minas. It was also later conveyed to police by witnesses that the fire was started by the owner of the home himself which was investigated by the Policia Civil (Civil Police).

Emergency announcement made by AEGEA to all of the city.

==== 2023 electrical problems ====
Between 4 and 5 May 2023, the neighborhood next to Vila Império, Castanheiras, suffered through an interruption of electrical energy across itself which spread into some Vila-Impériense parts. The interruption was later confirmed to have been caused by a repairment process made by CEMIG, the state of Minas Gerais' organized energy company.

==== 2024 water problems ====
On 14 May 2024, water problems were reported across 11 neighborhoods of the municipality of Governador Valadares, including the Vila Império. The problems primarily only affected the city for around a day before emergency services were put together in order to resume water services. Another subsequent water problem also occurred in the neighborhood after a breaking of a water main in the São Paulo (Saint Paul) neighborhood, affecting the water distribution of 25 neighborhoods. Following the breaking the business responsible for the waters of the city, AEGEA Saneamento, responded by sending groups of workers towards the location of where the breaking occurred in order to fix the problem within 1–2 days.

==== 31 May 2024 blackout ====
Photo of energy fixing in Vila Império

On 31 May 2024, a power outage caused by the falling of an energy post during a car accident in the neighborhood of Castanheiras affected the thousands of residents of the area between Vila Império, Castanheiras and adjacent São Cristóvão, leading to energy blackouts for the consumers in the neighborhoods. The power only managed to come back around two days later when several workers came to fix the area in order for the neighborhoods to regain electricity.

== Crime and police ==
The Vila Império has an overall rising history in terms of crime with the crime rate growing in recent years. Most of the crimes being of robberies of which were usually handled by the Policia Militar and rarely the Civil Police of Governador Valadares, both of which are scattered across the city and have several headquarters which serve the neighborhoods included the Vila Império.

=== Notorious crimes ===
==== 2021 home robbery ====
A notorious robbery occurred on 13 January 2021 when a 36-year-old man robbed a home in the Vila Império, stealing over $300 Brazilian reals, pieces of jewelry and a phone. The man also threatened and tied the home owners in order to succeed in his robbery, which he did. Afterwards he went through the train route between Governador Valadares and Belo Horizonte and was caught the Estação Ferroviária de Antônio Dias by the police force of Antônio Dias.

==== 2024 delivery robbery ====
Another significant robbery happened on 12 June 2024 when a group of robbers assaulted a delivery person, stealing a portion of food along with the persons' phone and motorcycle. The robbers then fled before the restaurant where the person worked at could along with the Policia Militar stations in the city, work towards catching them and retrieving the lost resources.

=== Police stations ===
While the municipality of Governador Valadares offers a range of police services and stations primarily controlled by the 6th battalion Policial Militar of Governador Valadares and the Quinto Companhia Independente, the Vila Império itself has two primary stations which offer services to it nearby. The nearest police station one is in Jardim Pérola (Garden of Pearls), a small neighborhood near to the Vila Império itself and of which offers 24 hour services to the region. Another nearby one governed by the Federal Police of Brazil is located in the Distrito Industrial (Industrial District) neighborhood, not far from the Vila Império.

== Post offices and CEP codes ==
The Vila Império is located on several CEP (ZIP) codes which change for each street that the neighborhood currently has registered with its CEP codes. The codes may differ if the road is shared between two neighborhoods or enters the scope of another one. Also, there are only a selective amount of post offices in the municipality. The closest one to the neighborhood being "CEE Correios Governador Valadares" (EEC Post Governador Valadares).

=== Vila Império CEP codes ===
- Rua Joaquim Pereira Duarte/Rua A: 35050-560
- Rua B: 35050-790
- Rua C: 35050-580
- Rua D: 35050-590
- Rua Edgard Fernandes/Rua Dois: 35050-600
- Rua Professor Cid Pitanga: 35050-610

== Roads ==
- Rua Joaquim Pereira Duarte (Former Rua A, largest road in the neighborhood; has 4 parts to it)
- Rua Edgard Fernandes
- Rua Milwald Alves de Lima
- Avenida Pecuarista Carlos Machado Rangel
- Rua 7
- Rua Tenente Gil Pereira
- Rua Oicilef Guerra
- Rua Walter Vilela
- Rua Sergio Murta de Andrade
- Rua Crisolino Ferreira da Costa
- Rua Marcondes Tedesco
- Rua Olane Tavares Pereira
- Rua Dr. Ruy Debiase
- Rua N
- Rua Diacono Gilberto Metzker
- Rua Paulo Sendas
- Rua Paulo Fernandes Rocha
- Rua José Ferreira de Almeida
- Rua Waldeck Martins
- Rua D
- Rua C
- Rua B
- Rua Professor Cid Pitanga
- Avenida Getúlio Vargas

== See also ==
- Governador Valadares
- List of neighborhoods in Governador Valadares (Note: In the Portuguese Wikipedia)
- Governador Valadares Airport
- Doce River
