= Itabirinha =

Municipality in eastern Minas Gerais state in Brazil

Coordinates: 18°33′57″S 41°13′58″W

- Municipality
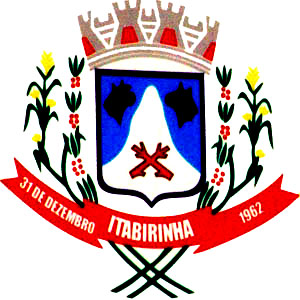
- Coat of arms
- Interactive map of Itabirinha
- Country: Brazil
- State: Minas Gerais
- Region: Southeast

Population (2022 Census)
  - Total: 10,362
  - Estimate (2025): 10,548
- Time zone: UTC−3 (BRT)

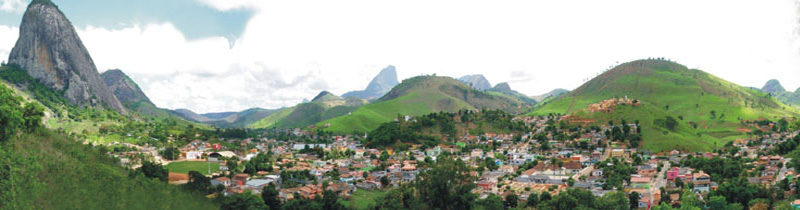
Panoramic view of Itabirinha

Itabirinha (formerly Itabirinha de Mantena) is a municipality in eastern Minas Gerais in Brazil, in the region of Rio Doce. In 2025, the estimate population of the city was 10.548.

== See also ==
- List of municipalities in Minas Gerais
- 1985 hailstorm in eastern Minas Gerais
