= Martinho Lutero Galati =

Brazilian conductor (1953–2020)

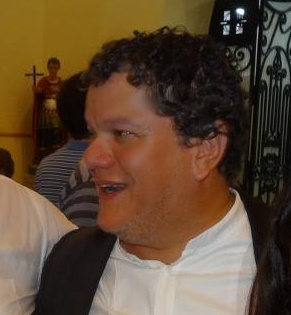
- Galati in 2014
- Born: Martinho Lutero Galati de Oliveira; 29 September 1953; Alpercata, Brazil
- Died: 25 March 2020 (aged 66); São Paulo, Brazil
- Occupation: Conductor

Martinho Lutero Galati de Oliveira (29 September 1953 – 25 March 2020) was a Brazilian conductor born in Alpercata, in the Brazilian state of Minas Gerais. He created and directed the Luther King Choir (1970), the Tchova Xita Duma Cultural Association (1982) and the Cantosospeso Association (1987). (Note: Luther was born in the district of Alpercata, which belonged to Governador Valadares at the time and only became independent in the following decade.)

Lutero wrote the book Do gesture à gestão: um diálogo sobre maestros e liderança. He was director of the Choir of the Municipal Theater of São Paulo from 2013 to 2016, president of the Brazilian Association of Choral Conductors in 2018 and professor at the Free University of Languages and Communication and at the Institute of Musicology of Milan. He died in São Paulo in March 2020 after suffering from COVID-19.

== Biography ==
Luther arrived in São Paulo in 1960, where he completed his basic education and the music training he had begun as a child. He took lessons from renowned conductors such as Jonas Christensen, Hans Joachim Koellheutter and Eleazar de Carvalho. During his teenage years, he conducted the São Paulo Musical Youth Choir (Portuguese: Coro da Juventude Musical de São Paulo), directed the play Hair and participated in concerts at the Municipal Theater.

In 1970, Galati created the Luther King Choir (Coro Luther King) in São Paulo, whose performances highlight cultures that have contributed to the formation of Brazil. The repertoire and sound of the performances conducted by Lutero influenced many choirs in Brazil and led the Luther King Choir to perform in several countries, such as Italy, France, Germany, Cuba, Angola and Tunisia. After spending a season in Buenos Aires, where he completed his orchestral conducting studies at the Torquato di Tella Conservatory, Lutero returned to São Paulo, where he led and coordinated orchestras, concerts and choral music departments at different institutions.

He lived in Africa from 1978 to 1984, where he conducted research into traditional music for UNESCO. In the last year of his visit, he founded the Tchova Xita Dima Cultural Association (Associação Cultural Tchova Xita Dima) in Maputo with a group of intellectuals, university students and journalists in order to promote art in the areas of music and theater. Also in Mozambique, he founded the National School of Music (Escola Nacional de Música), where he taught conducting and composition, produced the first series of traditional African music programs on Radio Mozambique and published the Cancioneiro Infantil Moçambicano.

After 1985, he deepened his musical studies in Europe, where he met important conductors and composers, such as the Italian Luigi Nono. In 1987, he founded the Cantosospeso Association (Associação Cantosospeso) in Milan, aimed at spreading choral practice as an exercise in coexistence and an opportunity to bring people closer to music. In 2012, he was awarded the prize for best choral ensemble by the São Paulo Association of Art Critics (Associação Paulista de Críticos de Arte - APCA). In 2015, he worked as artistic director of the Luther King Choir in the concert I Have a Dream, held in honor of the American Baptist pastor Martin Luther King at the Afro Brasil Museum. From 2013 to 2016, Lutero acted as artistic director of the Mário de Andrade Choir of São Paulo (Coral Paulistano Mário de Andrade) and became president of the Brazilian Association of Choir Conductors (Associação Brasileira de Regentes de Coros).

He worked with Lella Cuberli, Luciana Serra, Celine Imbert, Gilberto Gil, Naná Vasconcelos, Inezita Barroso, Sérgio Ricardo, Cristovão Bastos, Zizi Possi, Marilia Medalha, Tito Martino, Fabiana Cozza, Ivan Vilela, Djalma Correa, Mauro Pagani, Miriam Makeba, Angélique Kidjo, Liz McComb, Dino Salluzzi and Mouna Amari.

In 2020, Martinho Lutero died from complications of COVID-19, a disease caused by the coronavirus.

== Publications ==
- Do gesto à gestão: um diálogo sobre maestros e liderança - co-authored by Rita Fucci Amato and with a foreword by conductor Isaac Karabtchevsky;
- Cantosospeso: storia di un coro diverso;
- Vamos cantar, crianças: Cancioneiro Infantil Moçambicano;
- A música tradicional de Moçambique.

== Recognition ==
=== Awards ===
- André Segovia Prize for conducting in Santiago de Compostela, Spain (1988);
- Luther King Choir - APCA Award for best choir in the city of São Paulo (2012).

=== Honors ===
- Musical Personality of the Year - Maputo, Mozambique (1989);
- Commendation of San Luigi IX - Vatican City (1990);
- Benemerenza Civica - Milan, Italy (2002);
- Title of Citizen of São Paulo (2010).

== See also ==
- Municipal Theatre of São Paulo
