= Ipaba =

Coordinates: 19°23′S 42°25′W

- Municipality
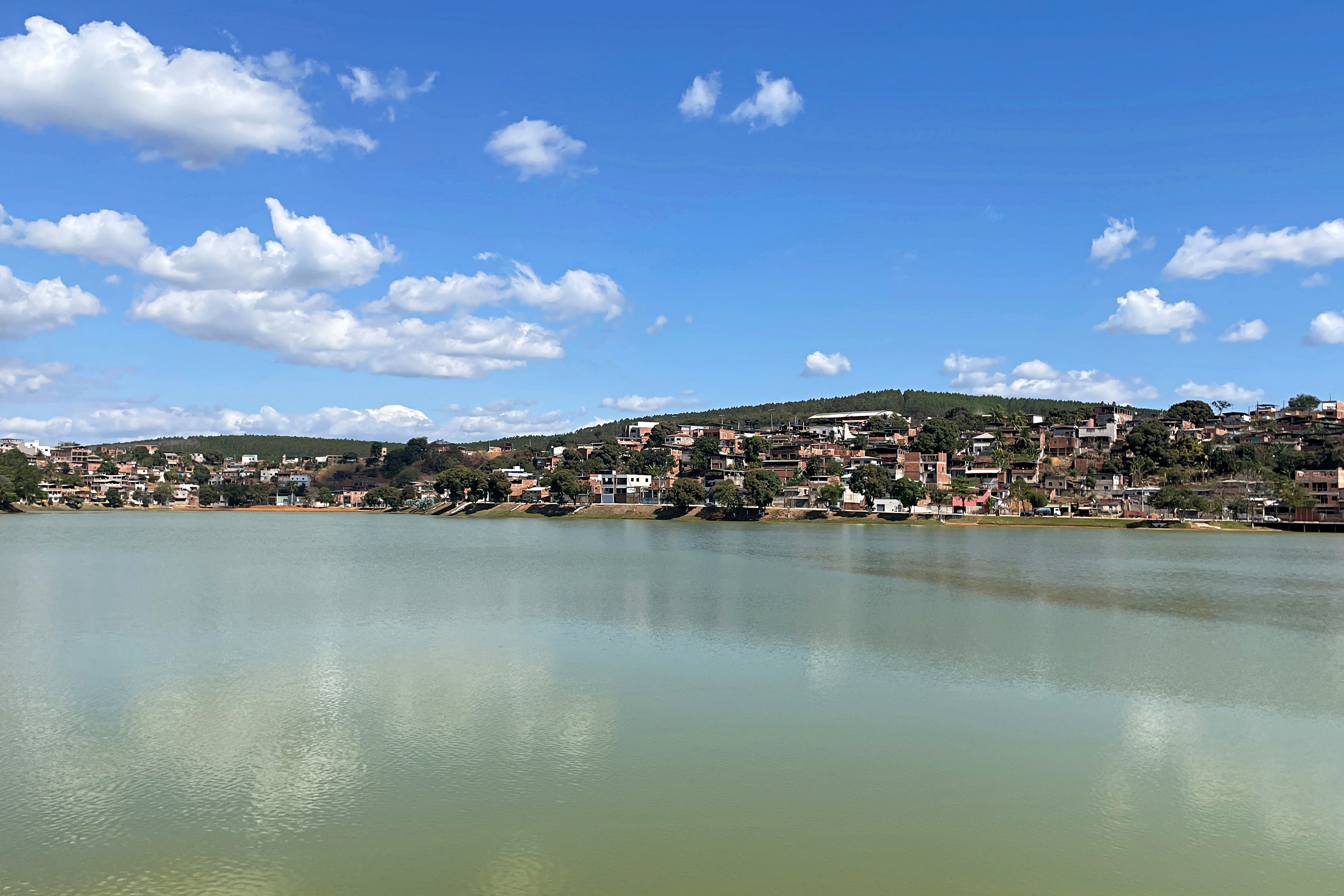
- Central Lagoon of Ipaba

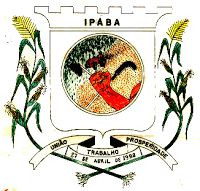
- Coat of arms
- Interactive map of Ipaba
- Country: Brazil
- Region: Southeast
- State: Minas Gerais
- Mesoregion: Vale do Rio Doce

Government
  - Mayor: Geraldo dos Reis Neves (PMBD)

Population (2022 Census)
  - Total: 17,136
  - Estimate (2025): 17,587
- Time zone: UTC−3 (BRT)

Ipaba is a municipality in the state of Minas Gerais in the Southeast region of Brazil.It is located in the Vale do Rio Doce and belongs to the metropolitan collar of the Steel Valley. Its estimated population in 2025 was 17,587 inhabitants.

== History ==
The area of the current municipality of Ipaba was first explored by João Antônio de Oliveira, João Caetano do Nascimento, João da Cruz and João Tomás, opening the way for the settlement of Ipaba. The place name comes from the word received Tupi upaba, which means "land of much water". By state law No. 8,285, of October 8, 1982, the district was subordinated to Caratinga, with dismembered lands of the district of São Cândido. The emancipation was decreed by state law No. 10,704, of April 27, 1992, and was installed on January 1, 1993. On June 15, 1998, by municipal law 242, there was the creation of the district of Vale Verde de Minas .

== Geography ==
According to the regional division in force since 2017, established by IBGE, the municipality belongs to the Intermediate and Immediate Geographic Regions of Ipatinga. Until then, with the validity of the divisions in microregions and mesoregions, it was part of the microregion of Caratinga, which in turn was included in the mesoregion of the Vale do Rio Doce .

== Infrastructure ==
The city houses the Dênio Moreira de Carvalho Penitentiary, which was inaugurated in 1995 and has capacity for 348 prisoners in individual cells. In September 2015, about 230 prisoners were studying and 400 were working, being considered one of the main prison complexes of the state.

== See also ==
- List of municipalities in Minas Gerais
