= Vale do Rio Doce (mesoregion) =

- Mesoregion
- Location within Minas Gerais
- Coordinates: 18°51′03″S 41°56′56″W
- Country: Brazil
- Region: Southeast
- State: Minas Gerais

Area
  - Total: 41,809.873 km^{2} (16,142.882 sq mi)

Population (2006/IBGE)
  - Total: 1,588,122
- Time zone: UTC-3 (BRT)
  - Summer (DST): UTC-2 (BRST)
- Area code: +55 38

Vale do Rio Doce (English: Doce River valley) is one of the twelve mesoregions of the Brazilian state of Minas Gerais. It is composed of 102 municipalities, distributed across 7 microregions.

== Demography ==
Largest cities in Vale do Rio Doce (mesoregion)|the Vale do Rio Doce mesoregion (IBGE 2010 census)
Rank		Microregion	Pop.	Rank		Microregion	Pop.
1	Governador Valadares	Governador Valadares	263594	11	Inhapim	Caratinga	24294
2	Ipatinga	Ipatinga	239177	12	Belo Oriente	Ipatinga	23397
3	Coronel Fabriciano	Ipatinga	103797	13	Itambacuri	Governador Valadares	22797
4	Caratinga	Caratinga	85322	14	Conselheiro Pena	Aimorés	22232
5	Timóteo	Ipatinga	81119	15	Ipanema	Aimorés	18169
6	Guanhães	Guanhães	31266	16	Peçanha	Peçanha	17270
7	Santana do Paraíso	Ipatinga	27258	17	Resplendor	Aimorés	17099
8	Mantena	Mantena	27115	18	Ipaba	Caratinga	16692
9	Mutum	Aimorés	26672	19	Sabinópolis	Guanhães	15707
10	Aimorés	Aimorés	24969	20	São João Evangelista	Guanhães	15538

== See also ==
- 1967 Rio Doce State Park wildfire
