= Governador Valadares Airport =

Coronel Altino Machado de Oliveira Airport Aeroporto Coronel Altino Machado de Oliveira

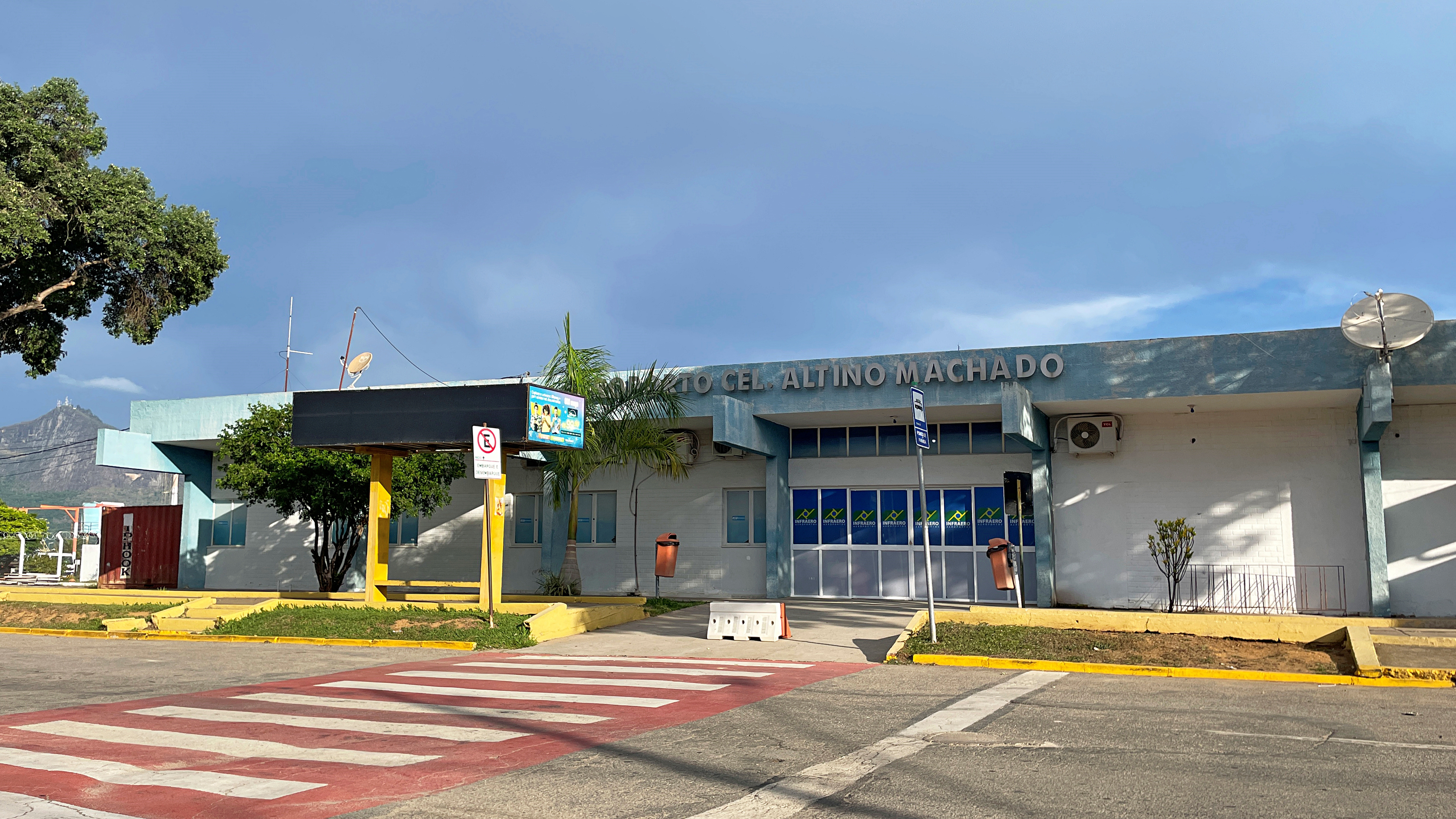
- IATA: GVR; ICAO: SBGV; LID: MG0032

Summary
- Airport type: Public
- Operator: Infraero (2023–present)
- Serves: Governador Valadares
- Time zone: BRT (UTC−03:00)
- Elevation AMSL: 171 m (561 ft)
- Coordinates: 18°53′46″S 041°59′00″W
- Website: www4.infraero.gov.br/aeroporto-governador-valadares/

Map
- Location in Brazil GVR (Brazil)

Runways
Direction	Length		Surface
Direction	m	ft	Surface
07/25	1,701	5,581	Asphalt

Statistics (2025)
- Passengers: 100,682 ▲19%
- Aircraft Operations: 6,919 ▲23%
- Metric tonnes of cargo: 133 ▲13%
- Statistics: Infraero; Sources: Airport Website, ANAC, DECEA

Coronel Altino Machado de Oliveira Airport (IATA: GVR, ICAO: SBGV) is the airport serving the city of Governador Valadares, Brazil.

It is operated by Infraero.

== History ==
On December 12, 2023 the airport started being operated by Infraero.

== Airlines and destinations ==
Airlines	Destinations
Azul Brazilian Airlines	Belo Horizonte–Confins

== Access ==
The airport is located 14 km (9 mi) from downtown Governador Valadares.

== See also ==
- List of airports in Brazil
