= São Geraldo do Baixio =

- Municipality
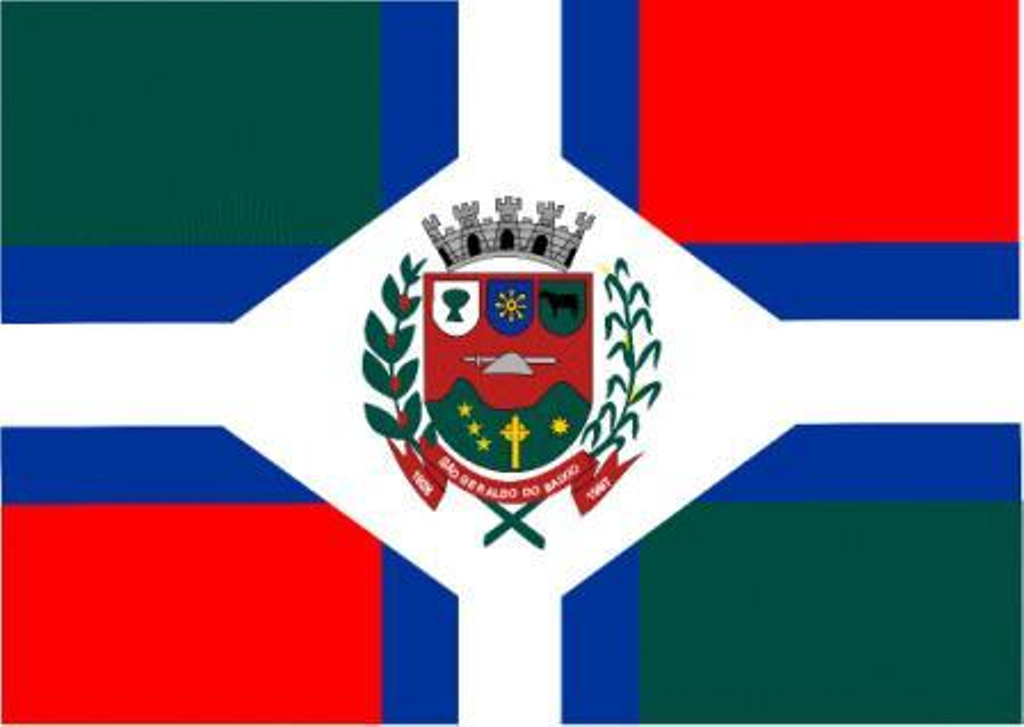
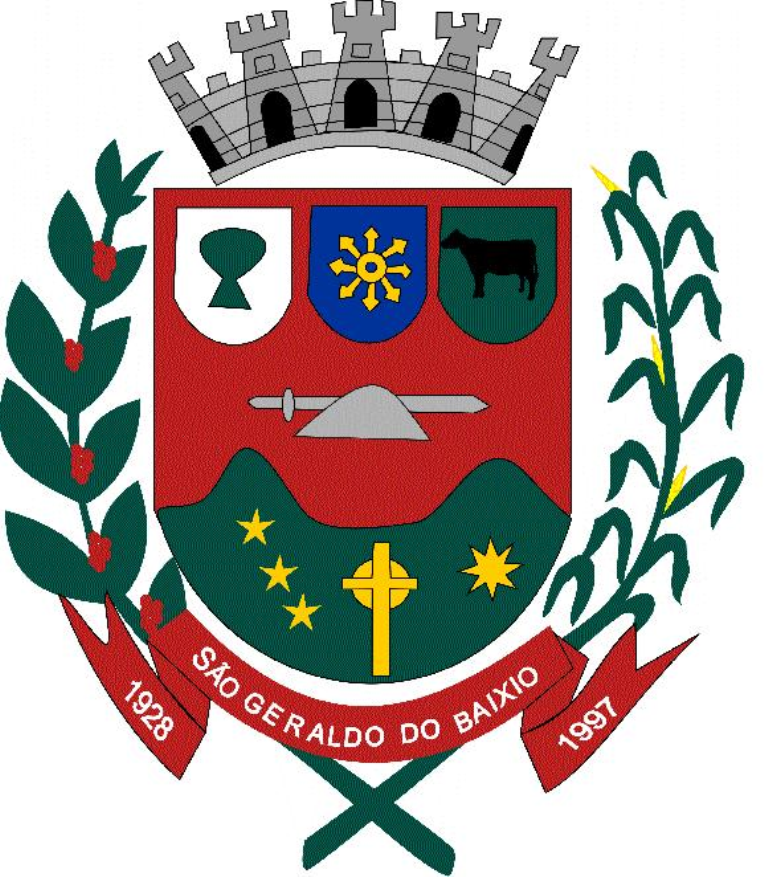
- Flag Coat of arms

- Location in Brazil
- Coordinates: 18°54′00″S 41°21′36″W
- Country: Brazil
- Region: Southeast
- State: Minas Gerais
- Mesoregion: Vale do Rio Doce

Population (2022 Census)
  - Total: 3,143
  - Estimate (2025): 3,158
- Time zone: UTC−3 (BRT)

São Geraldo do Baixio is a municipality in the state of Minas Gerais in the Southeast region of Brazil.

== See also ==
- List of municipalities in Minas Gerais
