= Sardoá =

Coordinates: 18°46′S 42°23′W

- Municipality
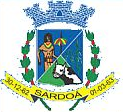
- Coat of arms
- Interactive map of Sardoá
- Country: Brazil
- Region: Southeast
- State: Minas Gerais
- Mesoregion: Vale do Rio Doce

Population (2022 Census)
  - Total: 5,104
  - Estimate (2025): 5,140
- Time zone: UTC−3 (BRT)

Sardoá is a municipality in the state of Minas Gerais in the Southeast region of Brazil.

== See also ==
- List of municipalities in Minas Gerais
