= Mathias Lobato =

Coordinates: 18.5919°S 41.9078°W

- Municipality
- Interactive map of Mathias Lobato
- Country: Brazil
- Region: Southeast
- State: Minas Gerais
- Mesoregion: Vale do Rio Doce

Population (2022 Census)
  - Total: 3,038
  - Estimate (2025): 3,053
- Time zone: UTC−3 (BRT)

Mathias Lobato is a municipality in the state of Minas Gerais in the Southeast region of Brazil.

== See also ==
- List of municipalities in Minas Gerais
