= São José da Safira =

Coordinates: 18°20′S 42°10′W

- Municipality
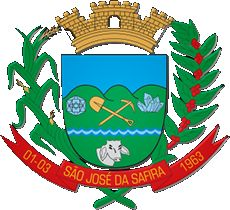
- Coat of arms
- Interactive map of São José da Safira
- Country: Brazil
- Region: Southeast
- State: Minas Gerais
- Mesoregion: Vale do Rio Doce

Population (2022 Census)
  - Total: 3,806
  - Estimate (2025): 3,849
- Time zone: UTC−3 (BRT)

São José da Safira is a municipality in the state of Minas Gerais in the Southeast region of Brazil.

== See also ==
- List of municipalities in Minas Gerais
