= Mantena, Minas Gerais =

Mantena Mantenense Terra boa and Terrinha
- Municipality
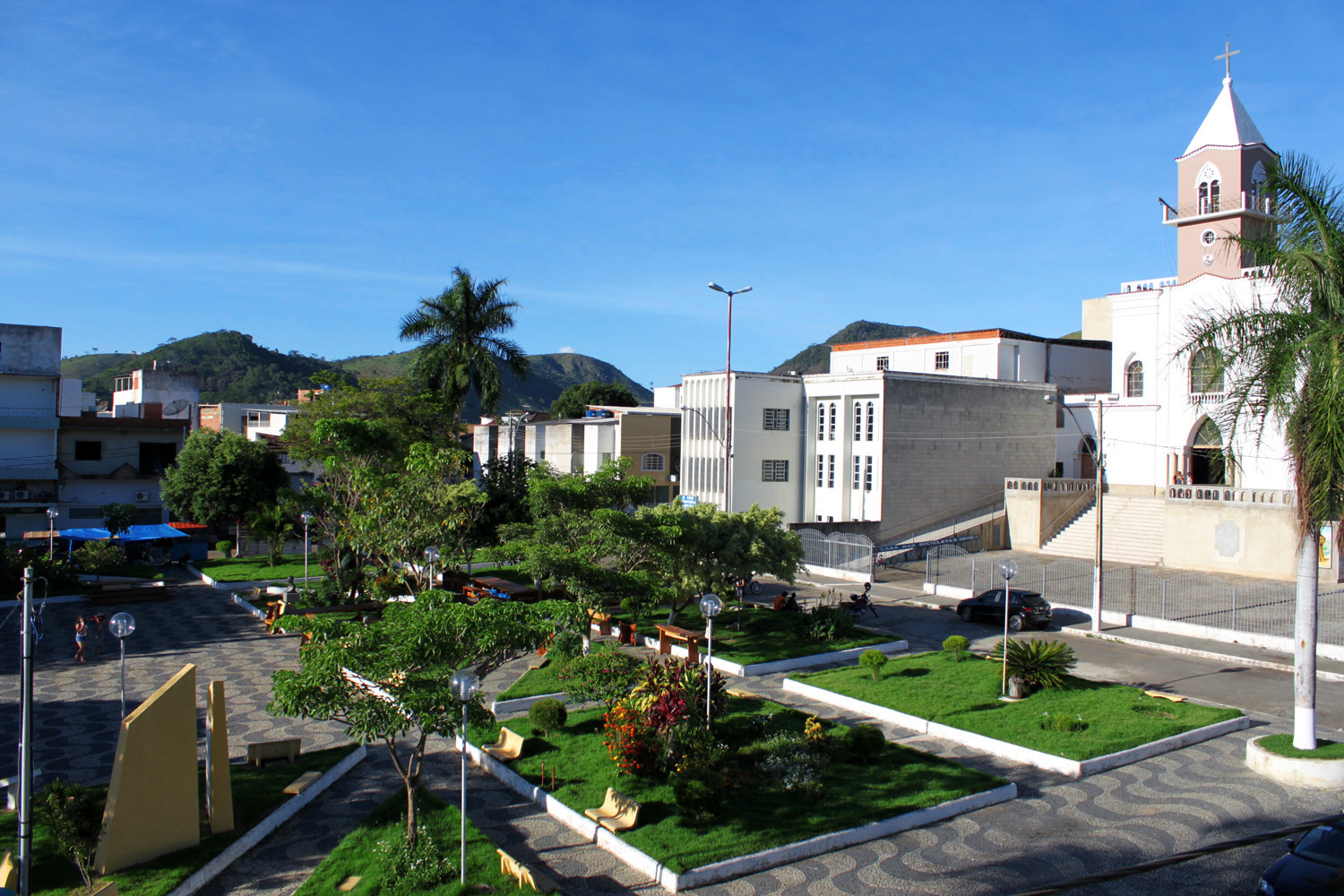

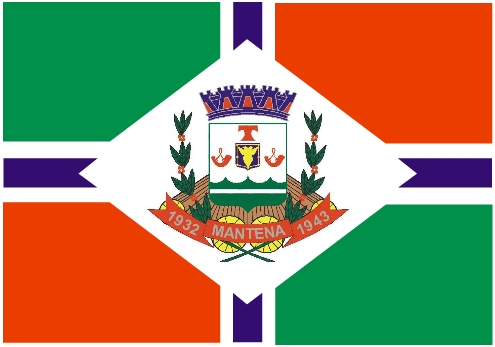
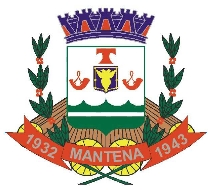
- Flag Coat of arms

- Location in Brazil
- Coordinates: 18°46′55″S 40°58′48″W
- Country: Brazil
- Region: Southeast
- State: Minas Gerais
- Mesoregion: Vale do Rio Doce
- Established: January 1, 2017 until January 1, 2021.

Government
  - Type: Executive, Legislative and Judiciary.
  - Mayor: João Rufino Sobrinho

Area
  - Total: 2,646 sq mi (6,852 km^{2})
- Elevation: 676 ft (206 m)

Population (2022 Census)
  - Total: 26,535
  - Estimate (2025): 27,350
- Time zone: UTC−3 (BRT)
- Postal code: 35290-000
- Area code: + 55 (33) 3241- ####
- Website: https://www.mantena.mg.gov.br/

Mantena is a municipality in the state of Minas Gerais in the Southeast region of Brazil.

Mantena is a Brazilian municipality in the state of Minas Gerais. According to IBGE data, the estimated population in 2025 was 27,350. (That census may omit pertinent data, as the population of the city was almost 50,000 before the separation of the districts of São João da Manteninha and Nova Belém, which were elevated to a city and its districts of Divino of Palmeiras, Santa Rita and Vargem Grande, together forming part of its municipality with a population of approximately 20,000 inhabitants.)

According to the Aurélio XXI Dictionary of Aurélio Buarque de Holanda, Mantena, in Goiás, means "good" or "great". The word also refers to a character who plays the king of the Christians and the Moors, in the cavailas of the municipality of Franca, in São Paulo. Also named are the knights of the Cavalry Association of São Gonçalo and São Benedito de Guaratinguetá, Aparecida and Lorena, all the cities of the Paraíba Valley, in the interior of São Paulo. The name "Mantena" is of indigenous origin and means "good soil", "fertile soil".

== History ==
Around 1920, the territory began to be populated. This happened thanks to the Capuchin priests, among them, Friar Innocent of Comiso. At that time, the lands that today form our Municipality belonged to the Municipality of Itambacuri, being part of the District called Lajão, later the District of Lajão was dismembered of Itambacuri, appearing the Municipality of Conselheiro Pena. In 1930, Emiliano Ferreira Júnior, bought a large part of these lands and came to occupy them with his family.

Two years after his installation in the lands, he was disgusted here due to the death of his daughter and decided to sell his lands to Cândido Ribeiro Gonçalves, known as Cândido Ilhéu. This one bought all the patrimony and donated a part for the construction of the town, with only 7 houses, receiving the name of "Bar of the Stream of the Islanders", in homage to the donor. On December 17, 1938, the mayor of the Municipality of Conselheiro Pena (to which belonged our village), Sebastião Anastácio de Paula, (who still resides in Conselheiro Pena), happy with the growth of the village turned it into a district by Law n0 158, the district of Bom Jesus do Mantena was created, comprising the entire region of São Mateus do Sul, with the participation of the district of Lajão, which became the municipality of Conselheiro Pena.

Eleven years after the creation of the town, the Governor of the State, José de Magalhães Pinto, issued a document (Decree No. 1,058), creating the Municipality of Mantena. On January 4, 1944, the first mayor, José Fernandes Filho (Fernandinho) was appointed by the Governor. On December 30, 1944, by Decree 1291 was installed the Comarca de Mantena, being its first Osvaldino Judge of Paula Salazar. The municipalities of Mendes Pimentel, Itabirinha de Mantena, Central de Minas, São João do Manteninha and Nova Belém belong to the District of Mantena.

The municipality began to experience an economic and geographic expansion of the largest, receiving families that came from several localities here. The production of coffee and the extraction of wood, attracted the attention of all, including the people of Espírito Santo, beginning there the sad story of the Contestado. The Contestado revolt was a conflict from the beginning of the settlement between the state of Espírito Santo and Minas Gerais, which ended only when the Federal Supreme Court established the boundaries between the two states. A treaty was signed that established peace between the two governors concerned: José de Magalhães Pinto (Minas Gerais) and Francisco Lacerda de Aguiar - (Espírito Santo), in September 1963. As of this date, the Municipality continued its expansion, based its economy mainly in the production of coffee, which also contributed to its economic stagnation due to the fall of the price of coffee in the world market. On December 9, 1963, the Official Gazette of the State of Minas Gerais published Resolution 569, Governor Magalhães Pinto. In it, along the "Law 2084 of the State of Espírito Santo", was defined the dividing line of the municipality, between the two states north of the Rio Doce, with the delimitations that it has today. At that time the district composition of the municipality was as follows: Headquarters, São João do Manteninha, Itabirinha. Santo Agostinho de Minas, Água Doce do Mantena and Barra do Ariranha.

The departure of Fernandinho was due to the return to legality in Brazil, after the fall of Getúlio Vargas. It was necessary to leave the government to dispute the marked general elections. In a short period of time other interventors were appointed who succeeded each other even for hours in front of the Municipality. They are: Aduvaldo Santos Pinto (1946, 2 months); José Maria Camargo (1946, 4 months); Adolfo Mário de Oliveira (1946, 4 months) and José Meira Júnior (1947). Fernandinho disputed the elections and was elected, being its mandate from 1948 to 1951. At its side appeared the first Chamber of Aldermen, formed by the masters:

Anselmo Luiz Cantuária Cornelio Fernandes de Araújo David de Almeida Leitão Yards Resende Boechat José Secundino da Fonseca Pedro Cirilo de Paula José Romero Duque José Gomes Vieira José de Sousa Ferreira Sebastião Coelho Bastos Waldir Pereira da Silva Limerick Calders Horsth

Since then, the following mayors have also ruled the municipality:

José Romero Duque (1951/1955) Domingos Jorio Filho (1955/1959) José Romero Duque (1959/1963) Waldir Pereira da Silva (1963/1967) José Monteiro da Gama Neto (1967/1971) (With the resignation of José Monteiro on June 2, 1969, Mayor Ermano Batista Filho assumed the position of Mayor) Adrião Baia (1971/1973) Ermano Batista Filho (1973/1977) Adrião Baia (1977/1983) Joel Garcia dos Santos (1983/1987) Fernando Sathler Mol (1988/1992) Joel Garcia dos Santos (1993/1996) Vicente de Paula Marinho (1997/2000) - (2001/2004) Cláudio de Paula Batista (2005/2008) Maurício Toledo Jacob (2009/2012) Wanderson Elizeu Coelho (2013/2016) João Rufino nephew (2017/2020) Current

Nowadays, the Municipality of Mantena, in spite of its distance from its capital, has been fighting against any stagnation, diversifying its economy, standing out from large textile companies such as Rabbit and granite mining companies, which are exported throughout the country. activities such as cattle raising and milk production also generate revenues and strengthen local trade. The municipality of Mantena also has a Department of Industry and Commerce to support new entrepreneurs who are interested in planting their companies in the region.

== Transport ==
The city has mostly paved streets and avenues, it does not have municipal bus service, which has already been tried because the idea was a failure, some point out that the reason was the majority of the population already have means of self-transport such as cars, motorcycles and bicycles and did not adapt to the buses that traveled through the main streets of the city, has taxi points for private transport and a bus terminal built in the 80s, with a large area for buses with six platforms for boarding and disembarking passengers being the largest terminal in the microregion of mangrove, but needs reforms and investments in bus lines to increase the flow of people and the municipal collection.

The bus terminal has daily lines for the cities of Barra de São Francisco, Colatina, Vitoria, Governador Valadares, Belo Horizonte, Porto Velho, São Paulo and other small municipalities in the region. It also has a runway for landings and take-offs on the highway. connects the municipality to Barra de São Francisco, located right on the border of the states of Minas Gerais and Espirito Santo.

== Geography ==
=== Climate ===
The climate of Mantena is hot and humid with mild temperature in the winter and considerable variations during the day, according to IBGE statistics. The maximum rainfall coincides with summer. Its dry period in the winter ranges from 1 to 3 months and the xerothermic index of the region ranges from 25.47 °C to 11.26 °C. The city was devastated in December 2013 by large amounts of rainfall that caused floods and incalculable damage to the local economy, the city took months to be cleaned due to the large amount of clay and debris that remained in the streets and gradually reestablishing causing serious administrative damages to the municipality the following year. The city has been punished in recent summers for temperatures that have risen from 46 °C, lived a period of drought from 2014 until the end of 2017 with great destruction of the local pastures by the strong sun and little rain, affecting the agribusiness and local livestock, taking many ranchers as alternative EMBRAPA programs like the Full Bucket Project.

=== Relief ===
Its relief is characterized by the presence of small mountains, rising gradually towards the interior, formed by pre-Cambrian crystalline rocks.

=== Vegetation ===
The vegetation diversifies in the region of the ecological sub domain, presents in the Mantena area the transition between hydrophilic coastal forests and the tropical deciduous forest. Not finding large forest reserves destroyed by man in the extraction of hardwood. In 2018 an outbreak of snake appearances in the city was reported, which frightened the local population, fearing the possible Jararacas snakes and true corals, which entered in homes and frightened the population hunted and killed publishing on social networks.

=== Soil ===
Its soil, predominantly clayey - sandy, tends to concentrate salts in the superficial horizon, which is used by livestock.

=== Hydrography ===
Mantena has a small hydrographic basin, started with the streams of the cloudy and cold stream started 6 km from the neighborhood of Vila Nova, join and form the São Francisco stream, the same permeates the entire district of the Vila Nova neighborhood, traveling from the Northwest to South of the city, coming to the Ilhéus Stream which is another small stream with springs near the known Serra Branca de Mantena, forming together the São Francisco River, which runs through the south-facing city to the north-east direction of the city, ending its a route in the city at the Sewage Treatment Station of the SAAE (Autonomous Water and Sewage Service of Mantena) flowing into the São Mateus River already in Capixaba territory, The São Mateus River passes near the Districts of Nazário on the Mineiro side and Café Ralo on the Capixaba side, making a Natural currency between the States 12 km to the North of the urban zone of the city.

In December 2013 the streams that cut the city overflowed causing havoc all over town, many people lost all furniture, home appliances and car dealers lost goods and many other havoc were recorded.

São Mateus River Ilhéus Stream Turvo Stream Cold Stream San Francisco Stream

=== Districts ===
Barra do Ariranha, Limeira de Mantena, Santa Rita and municipal seat.

=== Neighborhoods ===
Alvorada, Bela Vista, Boa Esperança, Centro, Colina, Ebenézer, Esplanada, Frei César, Nicolini, Operários, Philadelfia, Pires de Albuquerque, Santo Antônio, Santos Prates one, Santos Prates two, São Bernardo, São Silvano, Treze de junho, Treze de maio, Tropical, Vila Florindo, Vila Nova, Verli allotment and Maulaz allotment.

== See also ==
- List of municipalities in Minas Gerais
