= Sabinópolis =

Coordinates: 18°40′S 43°06′W

- Municipality
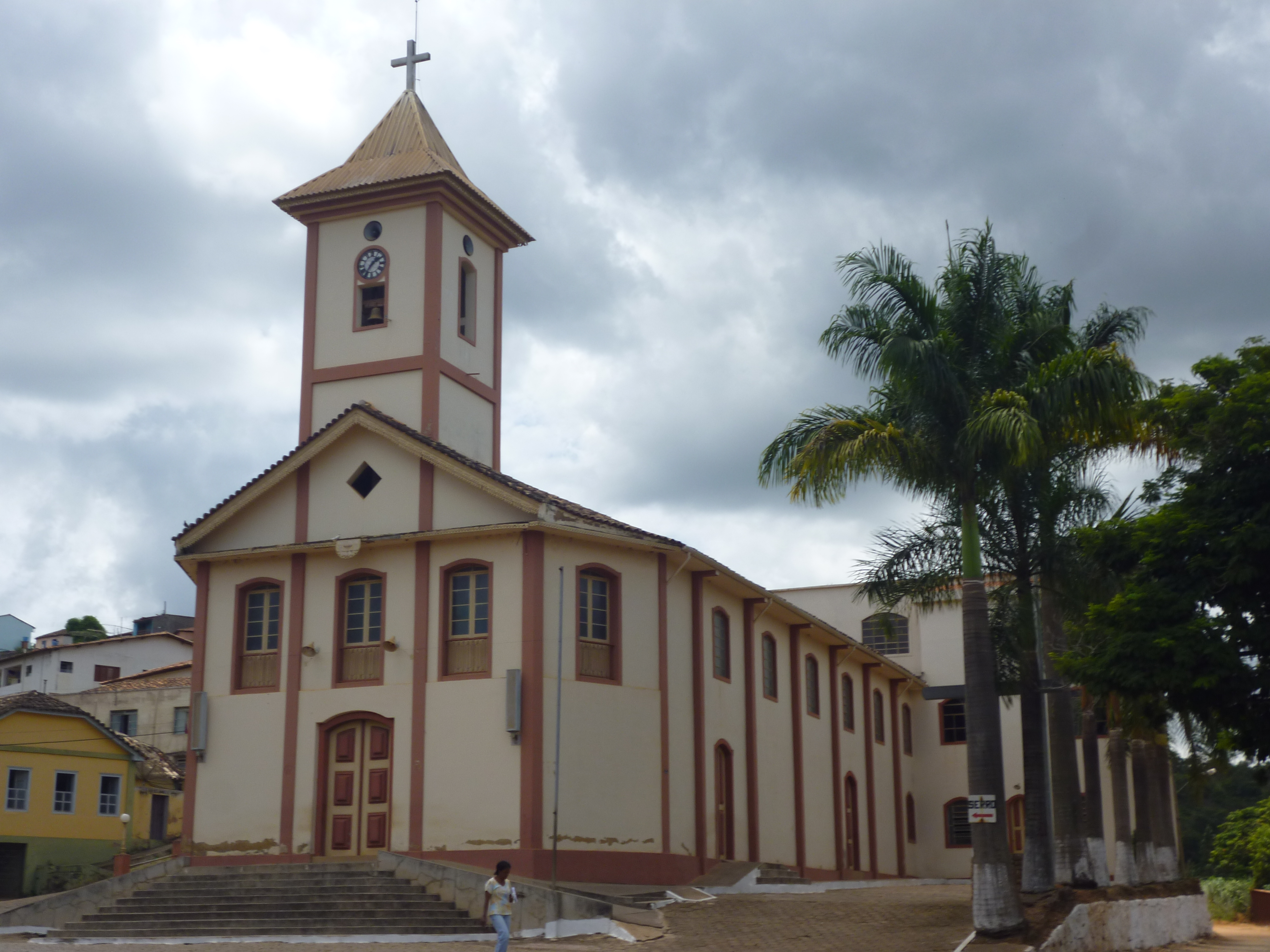

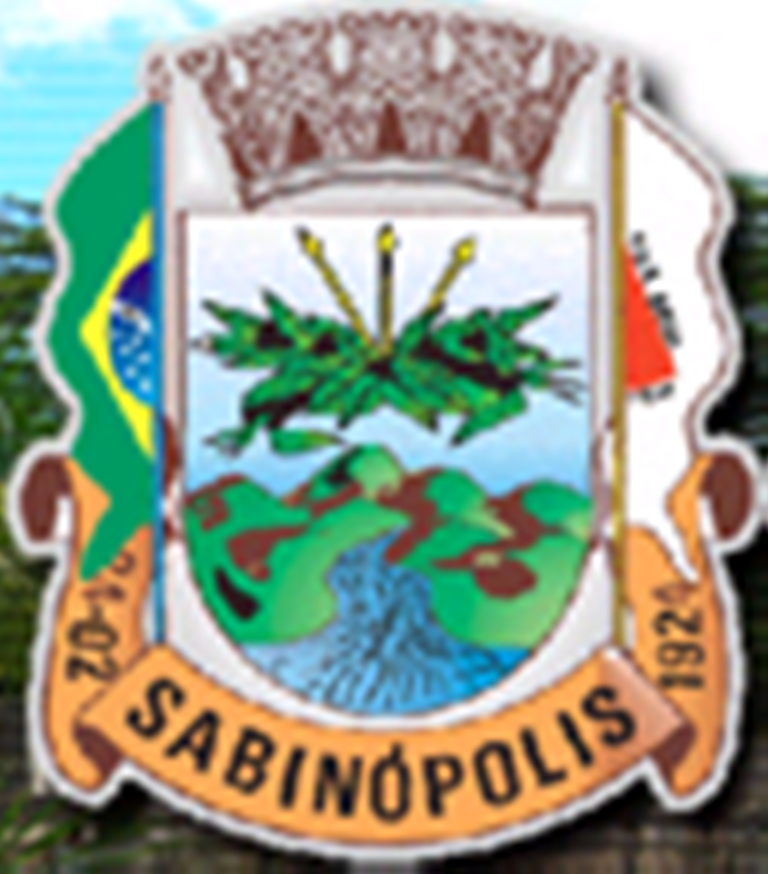
- Coat of arms

- Country: Brazil
- Region: Southeast
- State: Minas Gerais
- Mesoregion: Vale do Rio Doce

Population (2022 Census)
  - Total: 14,240
  - Estimate (2025): 14,309
- Time zone: UTC−3 (BRT)

Sabinópolis is a municipality in the state of Minas Gerais in the Southeast region of Brazil.

== Geography ==
According to the regional division in effect since 2017, established by the IBGE, the municipality belongs to the Intermediate Geographic Region of Governador Valadares and the Immediate Geographic Region of Guanhães. Previously, under the divisions of microregions and mesoregions, it was part of the Microregion of Guanhães, which in turn was included in the Mesoregion of the Vale do Rio Doce.

== See also ==
- List of municipalities in Minas Gerais
