= Capitão Andrade =

Coordinates: 19.0669°S 41.8578°W

- Municipality
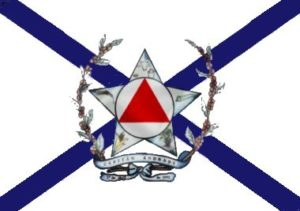
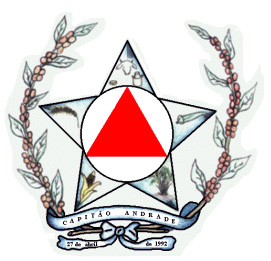
- Flag Coat of arms
- Interactive map of Capitão Andrade
- Country: Brazil
- Region: Southeast
- State: Minas Gerais
- Mesoregion: Vale do Rio Doce

Population (2022 Census)
  - Total: 4,585
  - Estimate (2025): 4,634
- Time zone: UTC−3 (BRT)

Capitão Andrade is a municipality in the state of Minas Gerais in the Southeast region of Brazil.

== See also ==
- List of municipalities in Minas Gerais
