= Engenheiro Caldas =

Coordinates: 19.2189°S 42.0458°W

- Municipality
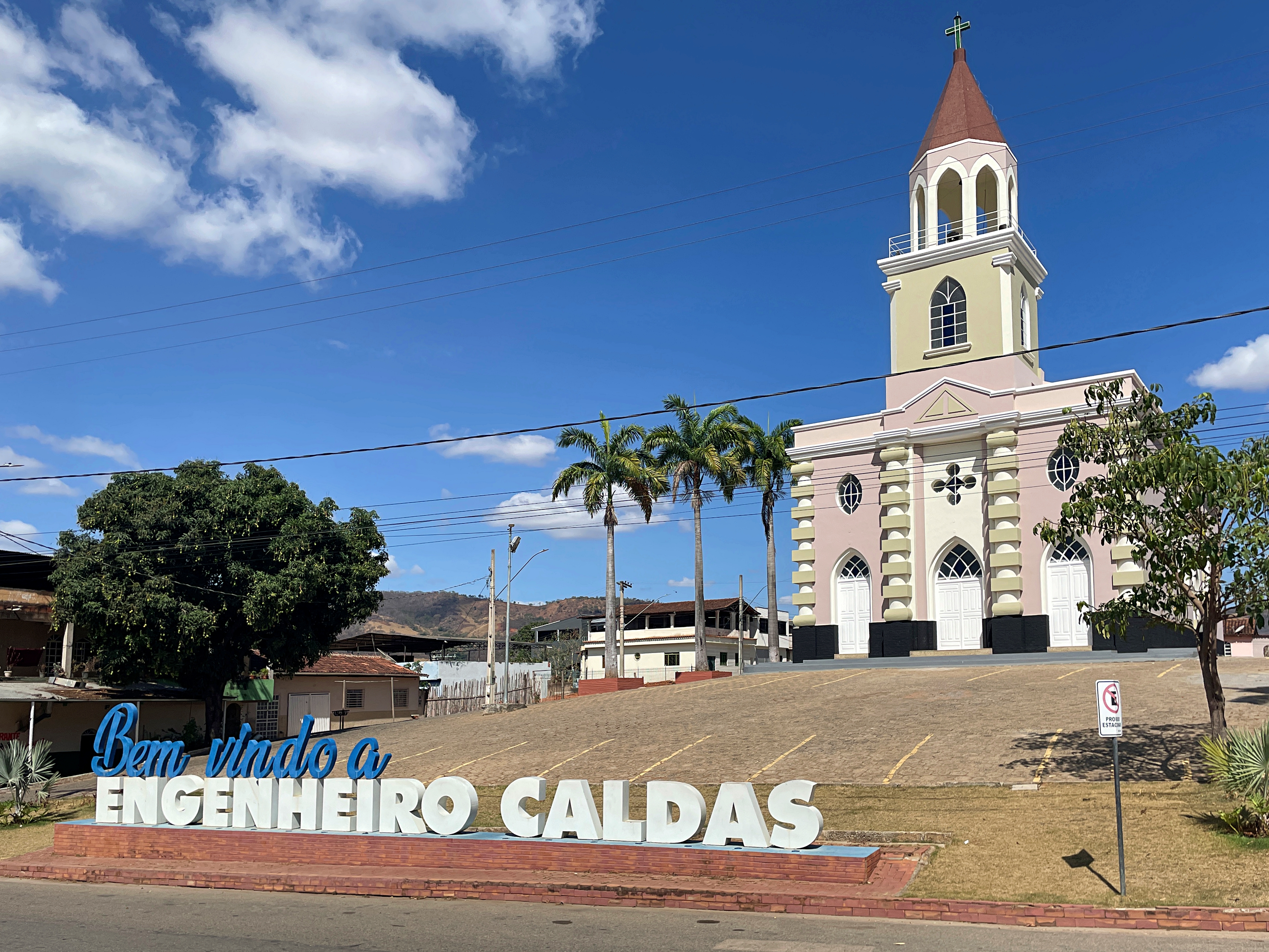
- Saint Barbara Matriz Church

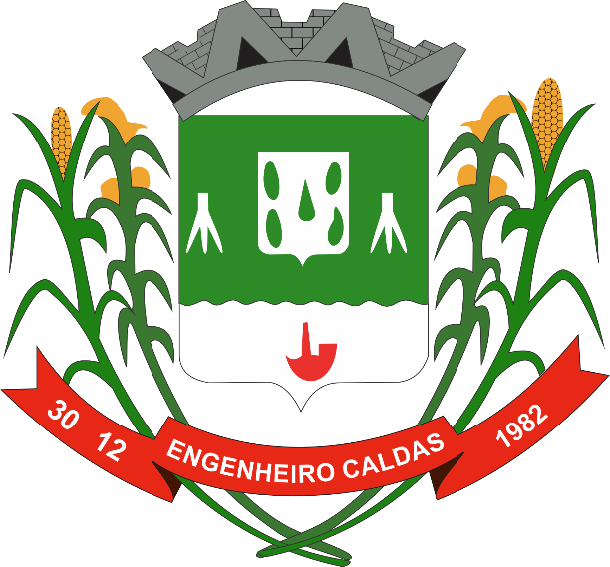
- Flag Coat of arms
- Interactive map of Engenheiro Caldas
- Country: Brazil
- Region: Southeast
- State: Minas Gerais
- Mesoregion: Vale do Rio Doce
- Established: 30 December 1962

Population (2022 Census)
  - Total: 13,622
  - Estimate (2025): 14,501
- Time zone: UTC−3 (BRT)

Engenheiro Caldas is a municipality in the state of Minas Gerais in the Southeast region of Brazil.

== See also ==
- List of municipalities in Minas Gerais
