= Peçanha =

- Municipality
- Location in Minas Gerais

- Location in Brazil
- Coordinates: 18°32′56″S 42°33′25″W
- Country: Brazil
- Region: Southeast
- State: Minas Gerais
- Mesoregion: Doce River valley
- Microregion: Peçanha
- Established: January 7, 1881

Government
  - Mayor: Eustaquio de Carvalho Braga

Area
  - Total: 384.442 sq mi (995.699 km^{2})
- Elevation: 2,560 ft (780 m)

Population (2022 Census)
  - Total: 17,446
  - Estimate (2025): 17,863
- Time zone: UTC−3 (BRT)
- CEP postal code: 39700-000
- Area code: 33
- HDI (2010): 0.627
- Website: Municipality official website

Peçanha is a municipality in the state of Minas Gerais in the Southeast region of Brazil. Peçanha is located 130mi(210km) northeast of Belo Horizonte. The municipality holds a population of 17,863 as of 2025, 68% of which identify as mixed/other, followed by white people at 21% and Afro-Brazilians at 11%. The town is named for João Peçanha Falcão, who founded the town in 1758 under the name Santo Antônio do Peçanha. It was made into its own municipality in 1881, taking the name Suaçuí before returning to its first name in 1887. In 1911, the municipality took on the name Peçanha.

== See also ==
- List of municipalities in Minas Gerais
