= Fernandes Tourinho =

- Municipality
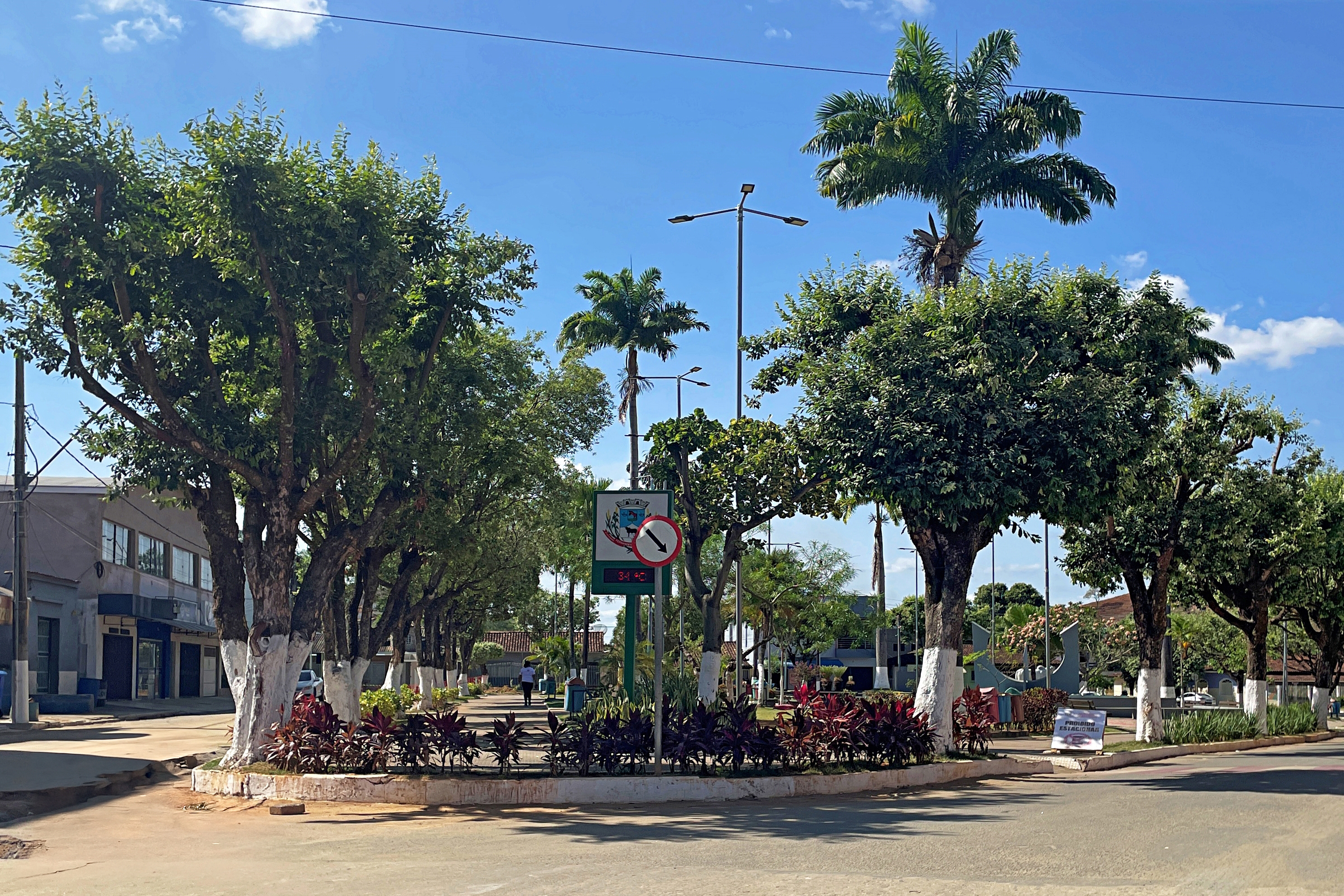
- Rodolfo Custódio Ferreira Square

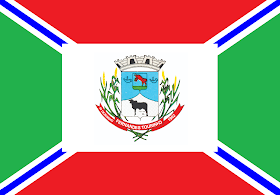
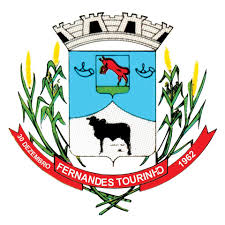
- Flag Coat of arms

- Location in Brazil
- Coordinates: 19.1539°S 42.0819°W
- Country: Brazil
- Region: Southeast
- State: Minas Gerais
- Mesoregion: Vale do Rio Doce

Population (2022 Census)
  - Total: 2,789
  - Estimate (2025): 2,814
- Time zone: UTC−3 (BRT)

Fernandes Tourinho is a municipality in the state of Minas Gerais in the Southeast region of Brazil.

== See also ==
- List of municipalities in Minas Gerais
