= Virgolândia =

Brazilian municipality

Coordinates: 18°27′S 42°18′W

- Municipality
- Interactive map of Virgolândia
- Country: Brazil
- State: Minas Gerais
- Region: Southeast

Population (2022 Census)
  - Total: 4,552
  - Estimate (2025): 4,471
- Time zone: UTC−3 (BRT)

Virgolândia is a Brazilian municipality in the state of Minas Gerais. As of 2025 its population is estimated to be 4,471.

== See also ==
- List of municipalities in Minas Gerais
