= Nacip Raydan =

Coordinates: 18.4589°S 42.2489°W

- Municipality
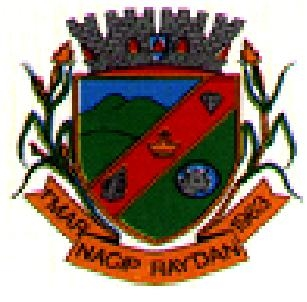
- Coat of arms
- Interactive map of Nacip Raydan
- Country: Brazil
- Region: Southeast
- State: Minas Gerais
- Mesoregion: Vale do Rio Doce

Population (2022 Census---->)
  - Total: 2,459
  - Estimate (2025): 2,400
- Time zone: UTC−3 (BRT)

Nacip Raydan is a municipality in the state of Minas Gerais in the Southeast region of Brazil.

== See also ==
- List of municipalities in Minas Gerais
