= Divina Providência =

- Bairro
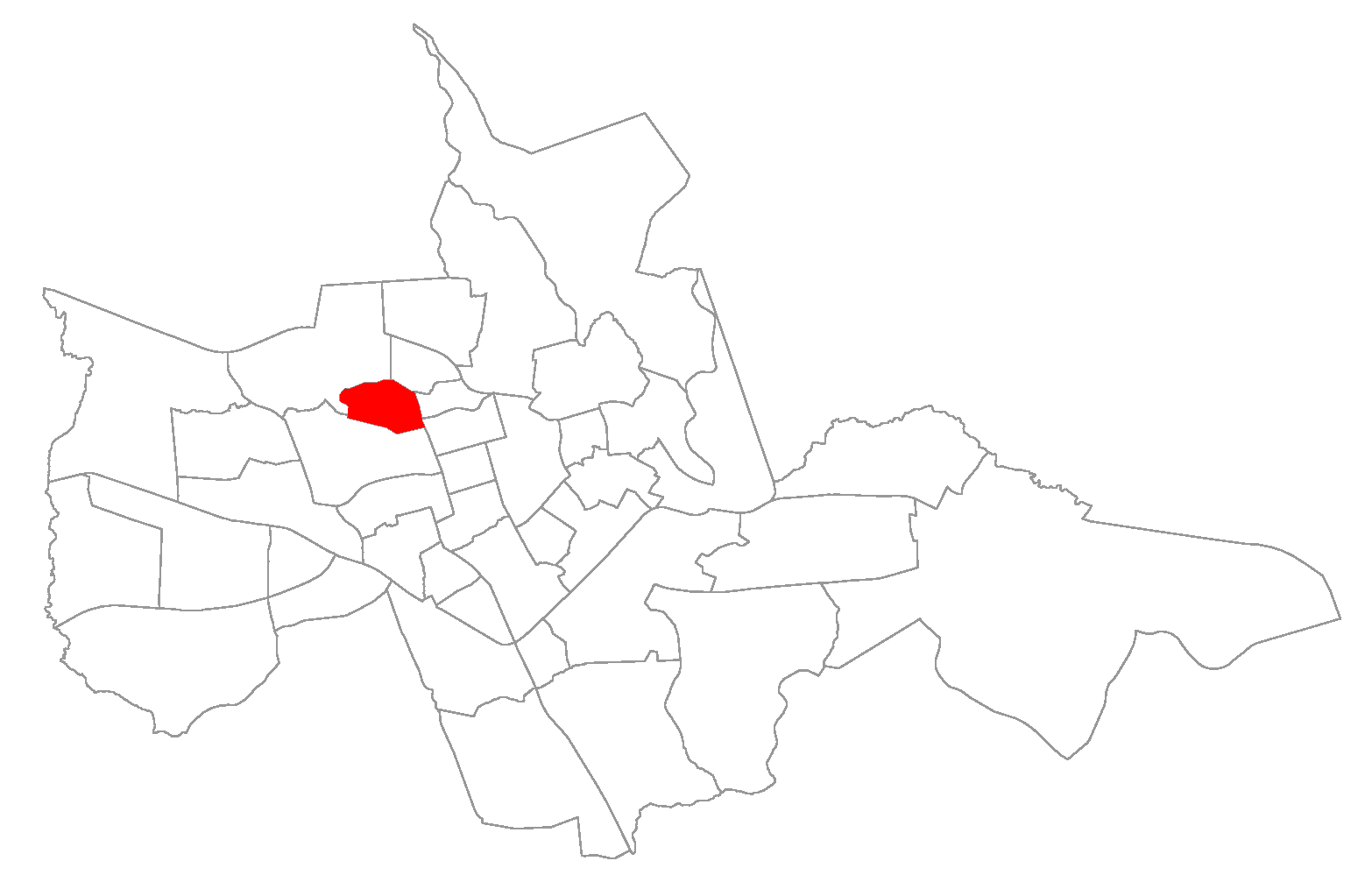
- The bairro in District of Sede

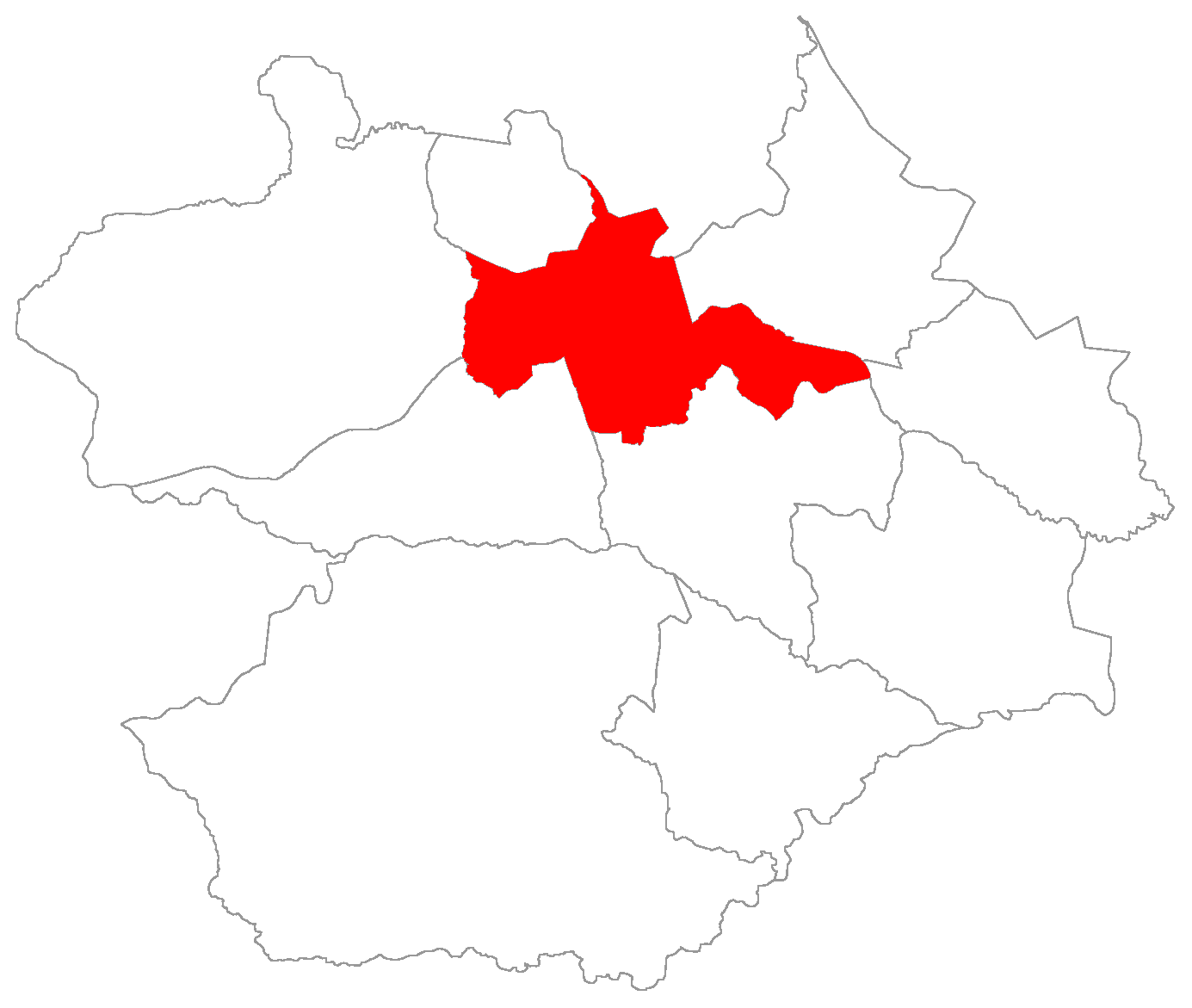
- District of Sede, in Santa Maria City, Rio Grande do Sul, Brazil
- Coordinates: 29°40′42.74″S 53°49′51.60″W
- Country: Brazil
- State: Rio Grande do Sul
- Municipality/City: Santa Maria
- District: District of Sede

Area
  - Total: 0.8536 km^{2} (0.3296 sq mi)

Population
  - Total: 1,347
  - Density: 1,578/km^{2} (4,087/sq mi)
- Postal code: 97.040-030 to 97.040-409
- Adjacent bairros: Carolina, Caturrita, Nossa Senhora do Rosário, Passo d'Areia, Salgado Filho.
- Website: Official site of Santa Maria

Divina Providência ("divine providence") is a bairro in the District of Sede in the municipality of Santa Maria, in the Brazilian state of Rio Grande do Sul. It is located in north Santa Maria.

== Villages ==
The bairro contains the following villages: Divina Providência, Vila Brenner, Vila Km 2, Vila São João Batista.
