= Sede, district of Santa Maria =

District of Sede Sede, the 1st district of Santa Maria
- District
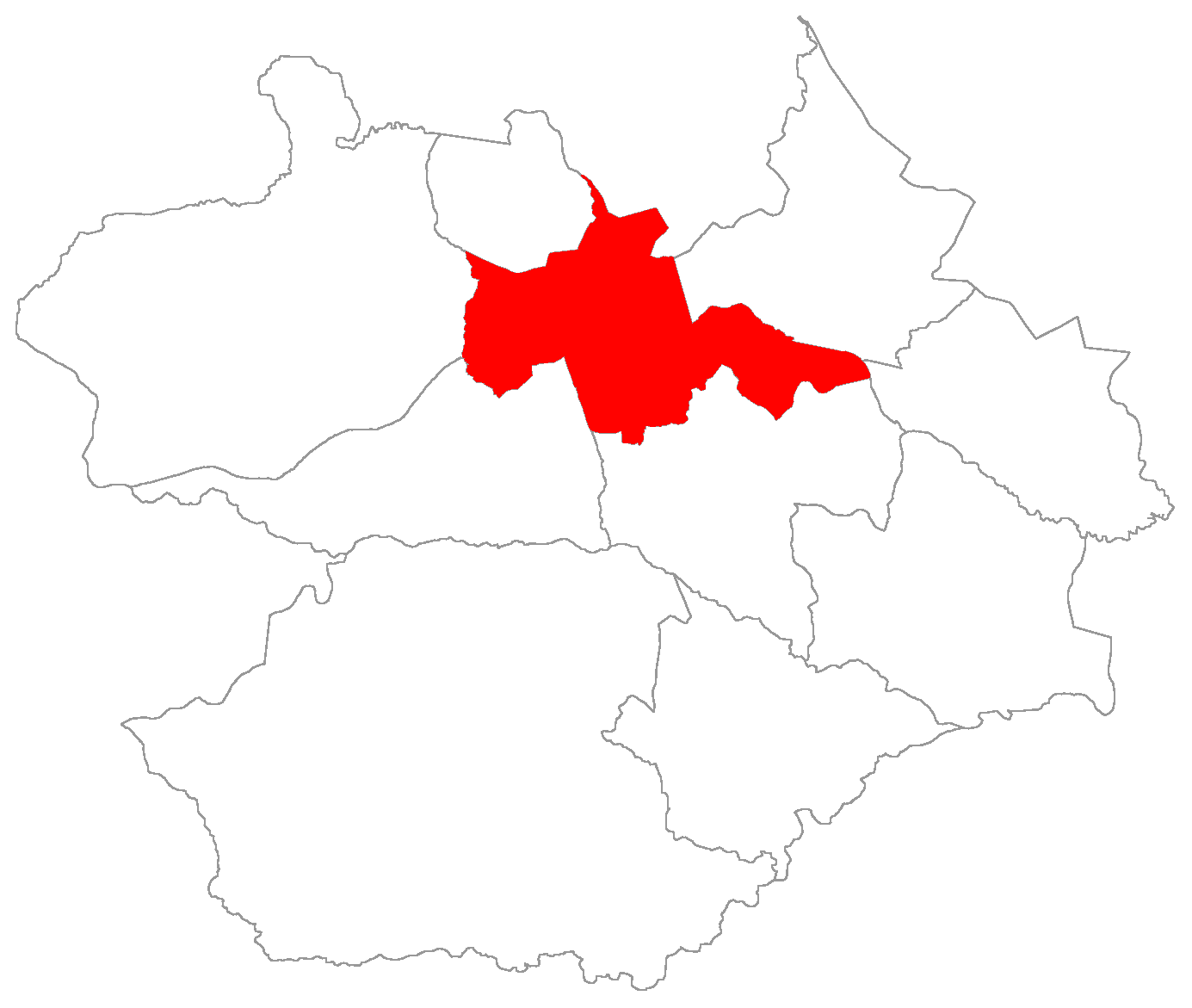
- District of Sede, in Santa Maria City, Rio Grande do Sul, Brazil
- Coordinates: 29°41′51.93″S 53°47′15.61″W
- Country: Brazil
- State: Rio Grande do Sul
- Municipality/City: Santa Maria

Government
  - Type: Subprefecture
  - Body: Subprefect

Area
  - District: 133.71 km^{2} (51.63 sq mi)
- Highest elevation: 300 m (980 ft)
- Lowest elevation: 60 m (200 ft)

Population
  - District: 246,465
  - Rank: 1st of 10
  - Density: 1,843.3/km^{2} (4,774.1/sq mi)
  - Urban: 246,465
  - Rural: 0
- Neighbourhoods: 41
- Adjacent districts: Arroio Grande, Boca do Monte, Pains, Palma, Santo Antão, São Valentim
- Website: Official site of Santa Maria

Sede ("Seat") is a district of the municipality of Santa Maria, in the Brazilian state of Rio Grande do Sul. It is situated in the north portion of Santa Maria. Downtown Santa Maria is one of its bairros (neighbourhoods).

The district of Sede owns an area of 133.71 km² that is equivalent to 7.46% of the municipality of Santa Maria that is 1791,65 km².

== History ==
The district was created with the denomination of Santa Maria da Boca do Monte, by provincial law number 6 of 1837, November 17, thus, the district still belonged to the municipality of Cachoeira do Sul. After, as Seat of the municipality of Santa Maria, the district gave origin, for separation, to many another districts, and, some of them became municipalities like Itaara.

The district of Sede contains the Downtown Santa Maria.

In 1982, the district had its first official division in bairros, in 1986 are made small changes. However, it was created detached bairros before 1982, like is the case of Bairro Roberto Holtermann that was created in 1961, and nowadays is part of the Nossa Senhora de Fátima neighbourhood with the name of Vila Holtermann.

The bairros - neighbourhoods - of Sede created in 1986 endured up to 2006, when the city hall and the city council created the actual bairros of the district, and:

- It was created new bairros: Carolina, Divina Providência, Agroindustrial, Boi Morto, Renascença, Nova Santa Marta, São João, Campestre do Menino Deus, Menino Jesus, Bonfim, Nonoai, Nossa Senhora de Fátima, Diácono João Luiz Pozzobon, Lorenzi, Dom Antônio Reis, Duque de Caxias, Noal e Uglione.
- The bairro Cohab Camobi was extinguished and attached to bairro Camobi;
- The bairro Cohab Passo da Ferreira changed its name to Tancredo Neves; The bairro Parque Pinheiro Machado changed to Pinheiro Machado;
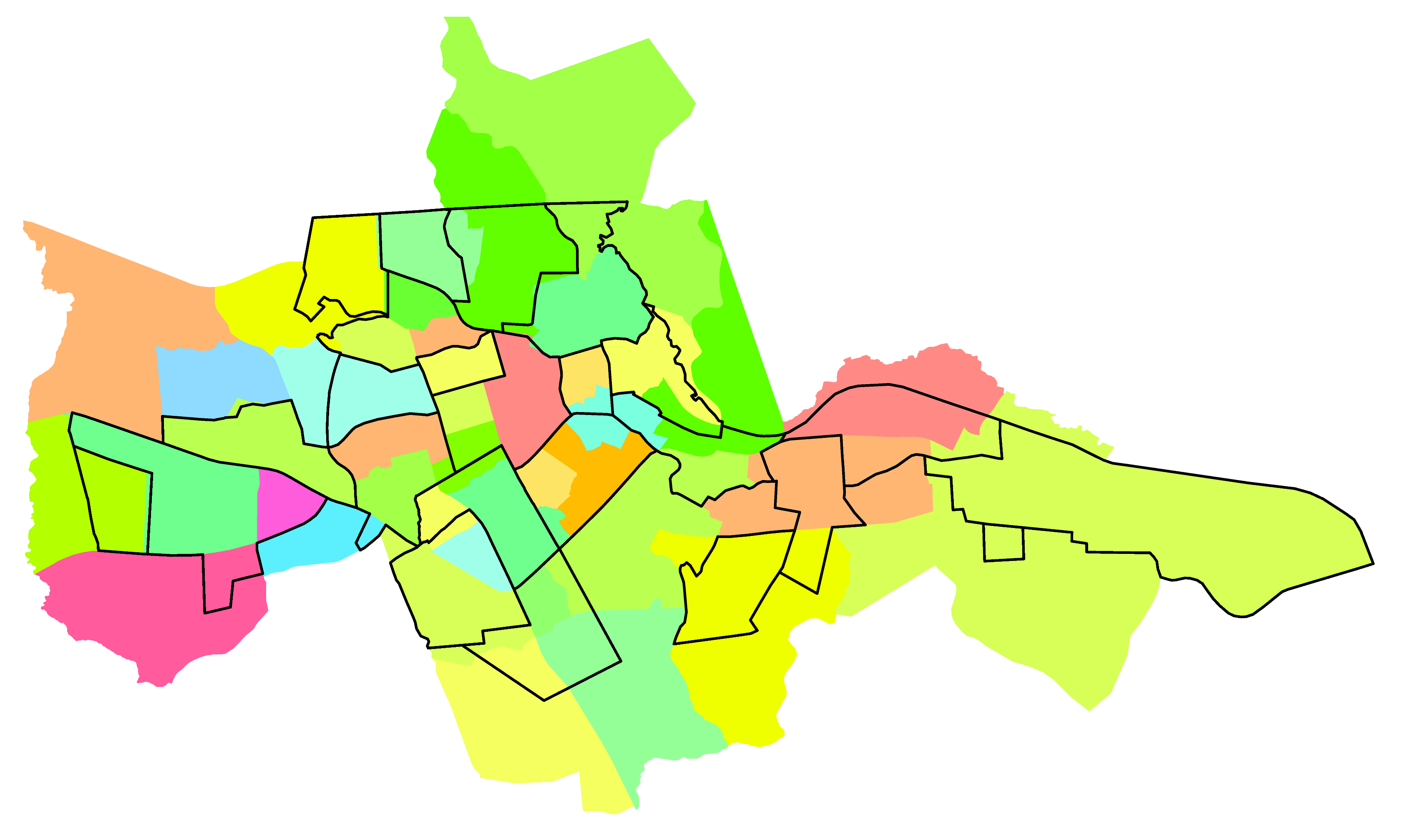

Difference between the division of 1986 (black lines) and of 2006 (bairros in colours).

Bairros from 1986 to 2006

A - Centro • B - Nossa Senhora das Dores • C - Nossa Senhora de Lourdes • D - Medianeira • E - Nossa Senhora do Rosário • F - Salgado Filho • G - Chácara das Flores • H - Nossa Senhora do Perpétuo Socorro • I - Itararé • J - Presidente João Goulart • K - Km Três • L - São José • M - Cerrito • N - Urlândia • O - Tomazzetti • P - Patronato • Q - Passo d'Areia • R - Juscelino Kubitschek • S - Caturrita • T - Pé de Plátano • U - Camobi • V - Cohab Camobi • W - Cohab Passo da Ferreira • X - Parque Pinheiro Machado

Bairros from 2006 on

1 - Centro • 2 - Bonfim • 3 - Nonoai • 4 - Nossa Senhora de Fátima • 5 - Nossa Senhora de Lourdes • 6 - Nossa Senhora do Rosário • 7 - Nossa Senhora Medianeira • 8 - Camobi • 9 - Carolina • 10 - Caturrita • 11 - Chácara das Flores • 12 - Divina Providência • 13 - Nossa Senhora do Perpétuo Socorro • 14 - Salgado Filho • 15 - Diácono João Luiz Pozzobon • 16 - Cerrito • 17 - Pé de Plátano • 18 - São José • 19 - Campestre do Menino Deus • 20 - Itararé • 21 - Km 3 • 22 - Menino Jesus • 23 - Nossa Senhora das Dores • 24 - Presidente João Goulart • 25 - Lorenzi • 26 - Tomazetti • 27 - Urlândia • 28 - Dom Antônio Reis • 29 - Duque de Caxias • 30 - Noal • 31 - Passo d'Areia • 32 - Patronato • 33 - Uglione • 34 - Agroindustrial • 35 - Boi Morto • 36 - Juscelino Kubitschek • 37 - Pinheiro Machado • 38 - Renascença • 39 - Nova Santa Marta • 40 - São João • 41 - Tancredo Neves

== Limits ==
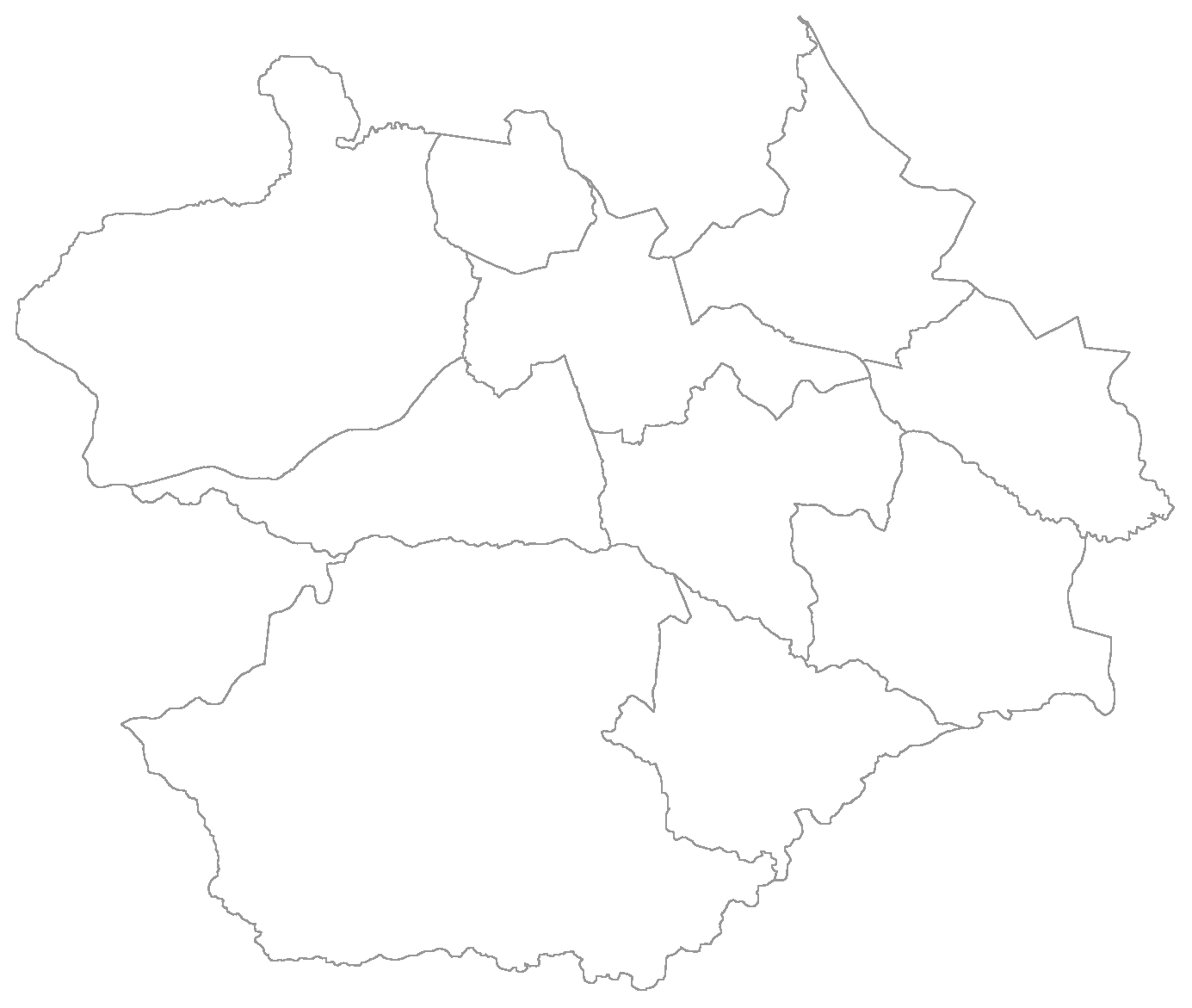
Map of the municipality of Santa Maria, Rio Grande do Sul, Brazil showing the division by districts.

The district limits with the districts of Arroio Grande, Boca do Monte, Pains, Palma, Santo Antão and São Valentim, and with the municipality of Itaara.

== Neighbourhoods ==
The district of Sede is divided in the following bairros, that in English is equivalent to neighbourhoods:

1. Agroindustrial
2. Boi Morto
3. Bonfim
4. Camobi
5. Campestre do Menino Deus
6. Carolina
7. Caturrita
8. Centro
9. Cerrito
10. Chácara das Flores
11. Divina Providência
12. Dom Antônio Reis
13. Duque de Caxias
14. Itararé
15. Diácono João Luiz Pozzobon
16. Juscelino Kubitschek
17. Km 3
18. Lorenzi
19. Menino Jesus
20. Noal
21. Nonoai
22. Nossa Senhora das Dores
23. Nossa Senhora de Fátima
24. Nossa Senhora de Lourdes
25. Nossa Senhora do Perpétuo Socorro
26. Nossa Senhora do Rosário
27. Nossa Senhora Medianeira
28. Nova Santa Marta
29. Passo d'Areia
30. Patronato
31. Pé de Plátano
32. Pinheiro Machado
33. Presidente João Goulart
34. Renascença
35. Salgado Filho
36. São João
37. São José
38. Tancredo Neves
39. Tomazetti
40. Uglione
41. Urlândia

== Roads and railway ==
- The district centralizes one of the main railway junction in Rio Grande do Sul State.
- In the district are the following highways:
  - RSC-287: Connects Camobi to Palma, Porto Alegre, and all portion east of the Rio Grande do Sul State;
  - BR-158: In the district, the highway begins its portion north and ends in portion west;
  - RS-509: "Evandro Behr Avenue", is one of the main connection from Downtown Santa Maria to Camobi, where is the Universidade Federal de Santa Maria;
  - BR-392: Connects the district to districts of Pains, Passo do Verde and Santa Flora, and, with the all south portion of Rio Grande do Sul State;
  - BR-287: Connects the district with the district of Boca do Monte, and all portion west of the Rio Grande do Sul State;
- Another important Streets are:
  - Nossa Senhora Medianeira Avenue;
  - Presidente Vargas Avenue;
  - Nossa Senhora das Dores Avenue;
  - Rio Branco Avenue;
  - Borges de Medeiros Avenue;
  - João Luiz Pozzobon Avenue;
  - Ângelo Bolson Avenue;
  - Hélvio Basso Avenue;
  - Walter Jobim Avenue;
  - Fernando Ferrari Avenue;
  - Liberdade Avenue;
  - Paulo Lauda Avenue;
  - do Acampamento Street;
  - Sete de Setembro Street;
  - Duque de Caxias Street;
  - Venâncio Aires Street;
  - Riachuelo Street;
  - Euclides da Cunha Street;
  - Vereador Antônio Dias Street.
