= Nova Santa Marta =

- Bairro
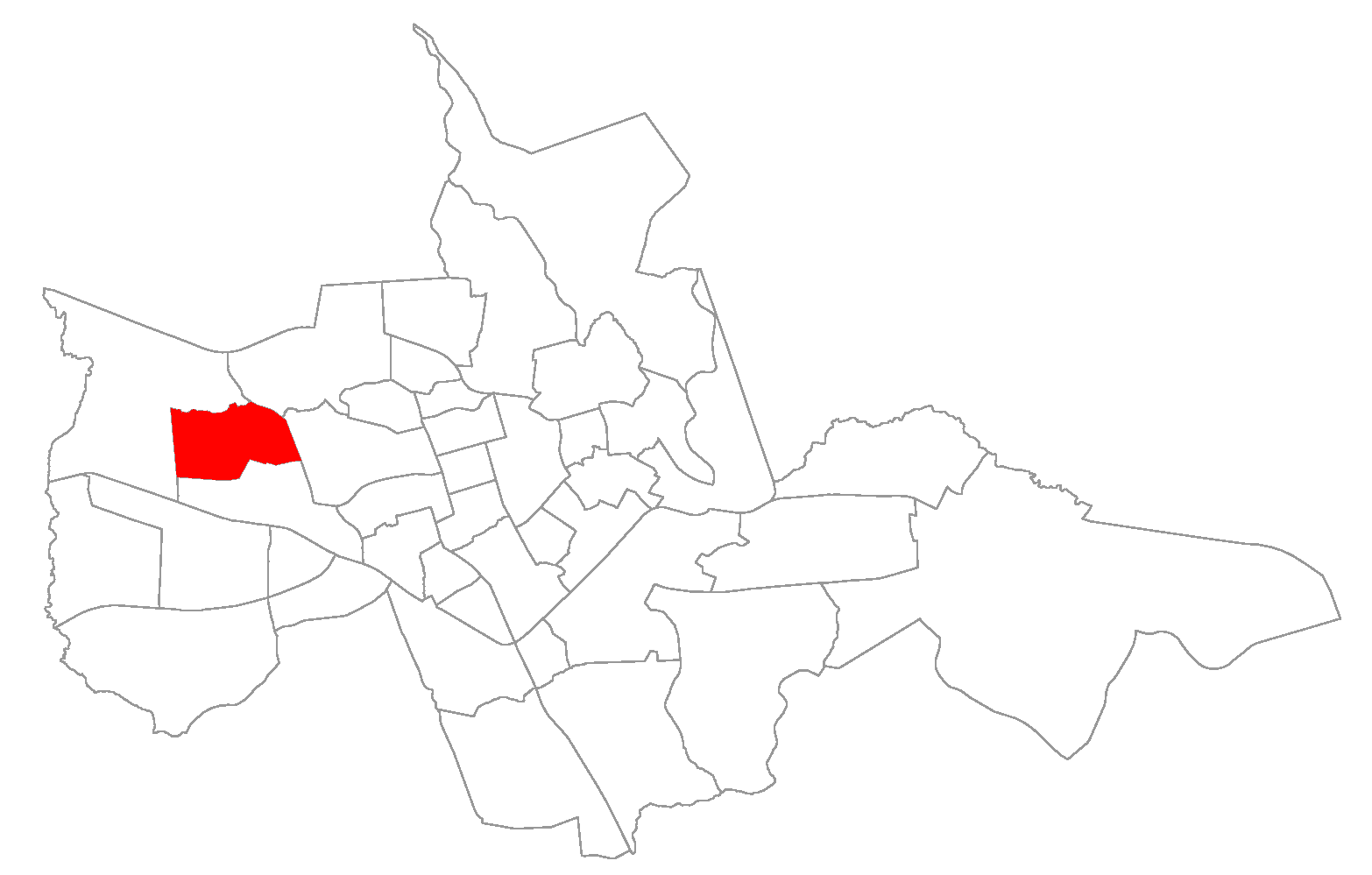
- The bairro in District of Sede

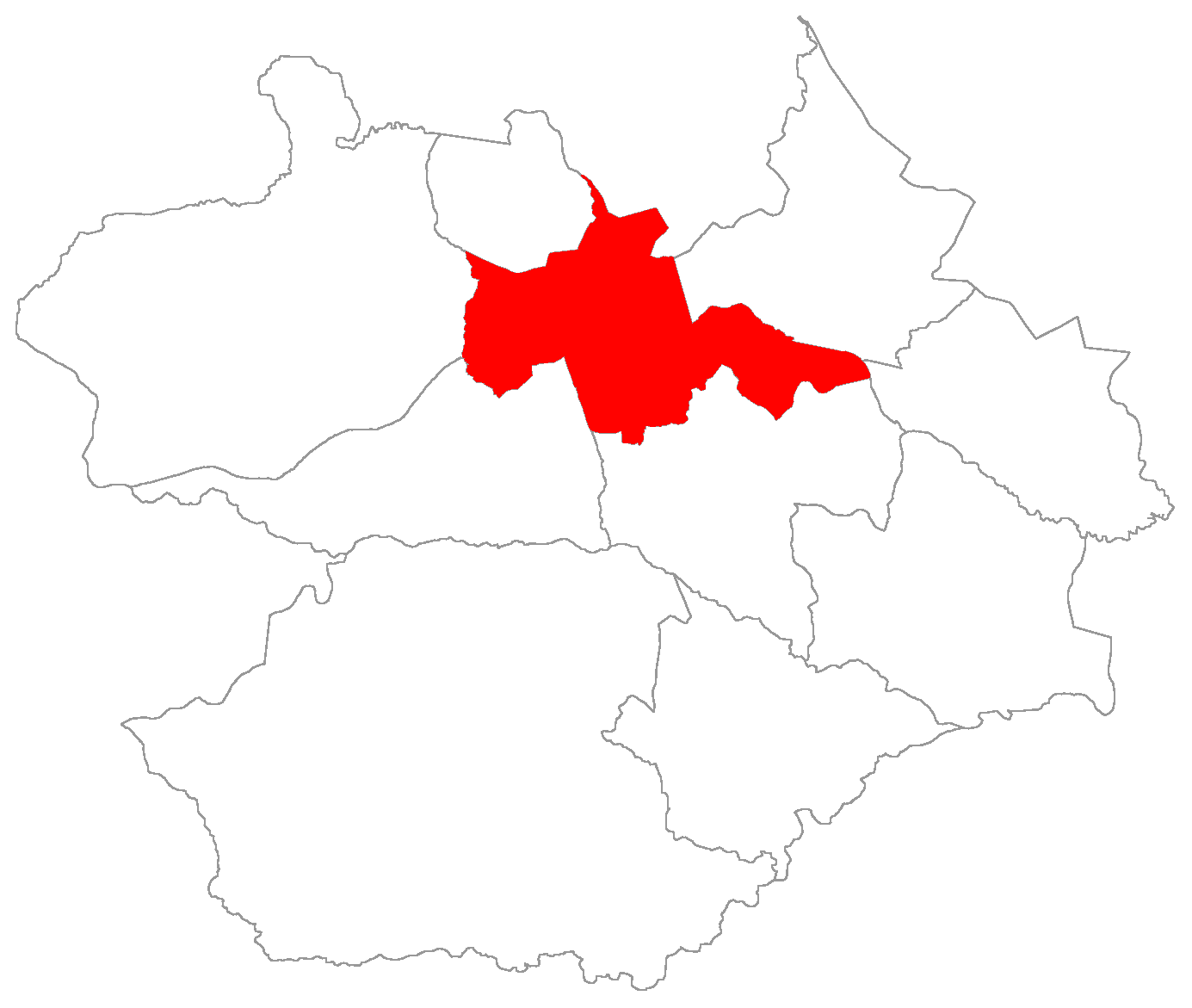
- District of Sede, in Santa Maria City, Rio Grande do Sul, Brazil
- Coordinates: 29°41′01.68″S 53°51′29.55″W
- Country: Brazil
- State: Rio Grande do Sul
- Municipality/City: Santa Maria
- District: District of Sede

Area
  - Total: 2.0714 km^{2} (0.7998 sq mi)

Population
  - Total: 12,722
  - Density: 6,141.7/km^{2} (15,907/sq mi)
- Postal code: 97.037-000 to 97.037-999
- Adjacent bairros: Agroindustrial, Caturrita, Juscelino Kubitschek, Passo d'Areia.
- Website: Official site of Santa Maria

Nova Santa Marta ("New Saint Marta") is a bairro in the District of Sede in the municipality of Santa Maria, in the Brazilian state of Rio Grande do Sul. It is located in west Santa Maria.

== Villages ==
The bairro contains the following villages: Loteamento Alto da Boa Vista, Loteamento Dez de Outubro, Loteamento Dezoito de Abril, Loteamento Marista, Loteamento Núcleo Central, Loteamento Sete de Dezembro, Nova Santa Marta, Vila Pôr do Sol.
