= Salgado Filho, Santa Maria =

Salgado Filho
- Bairro
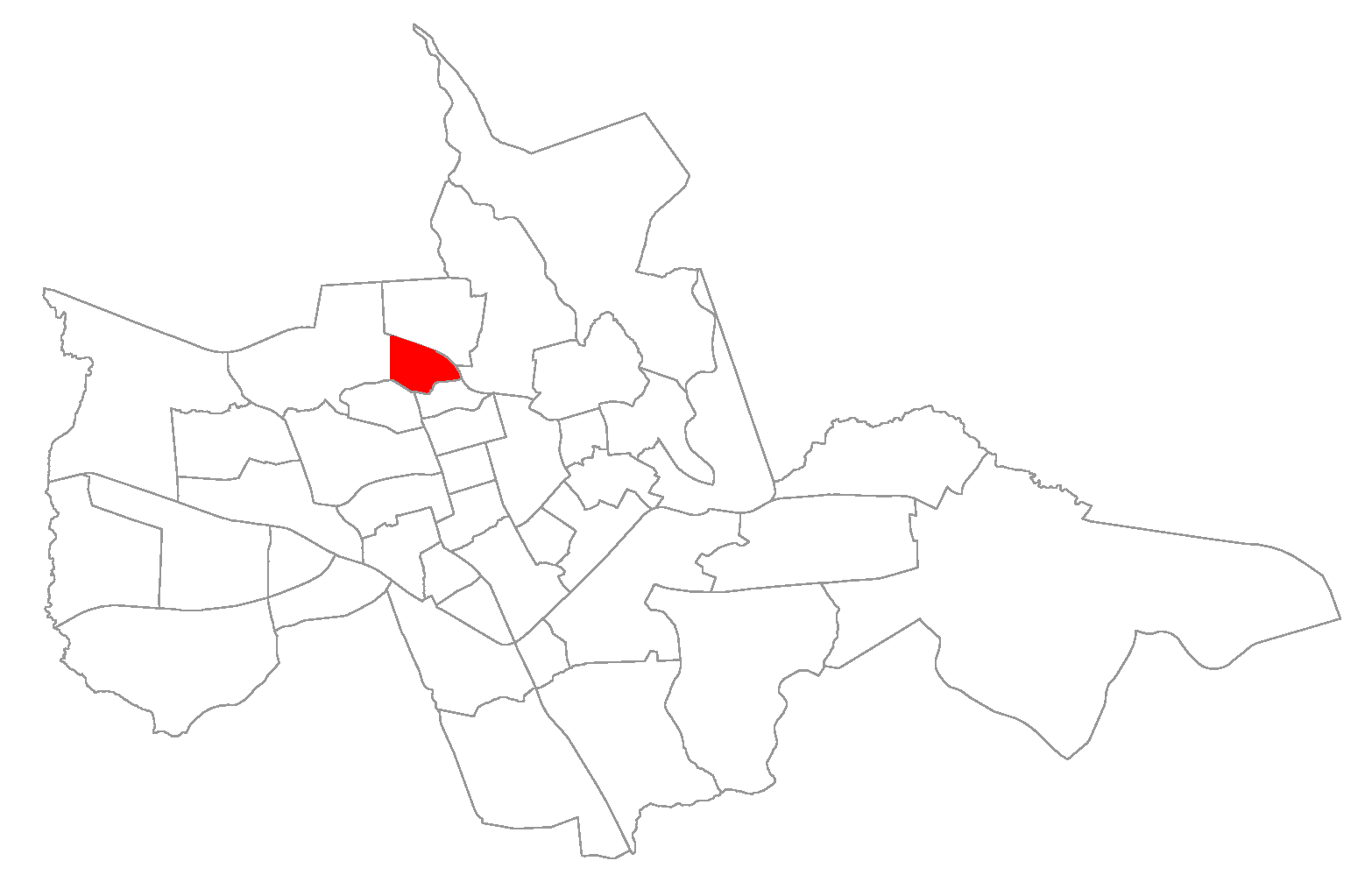
- The bairro in District of Sede

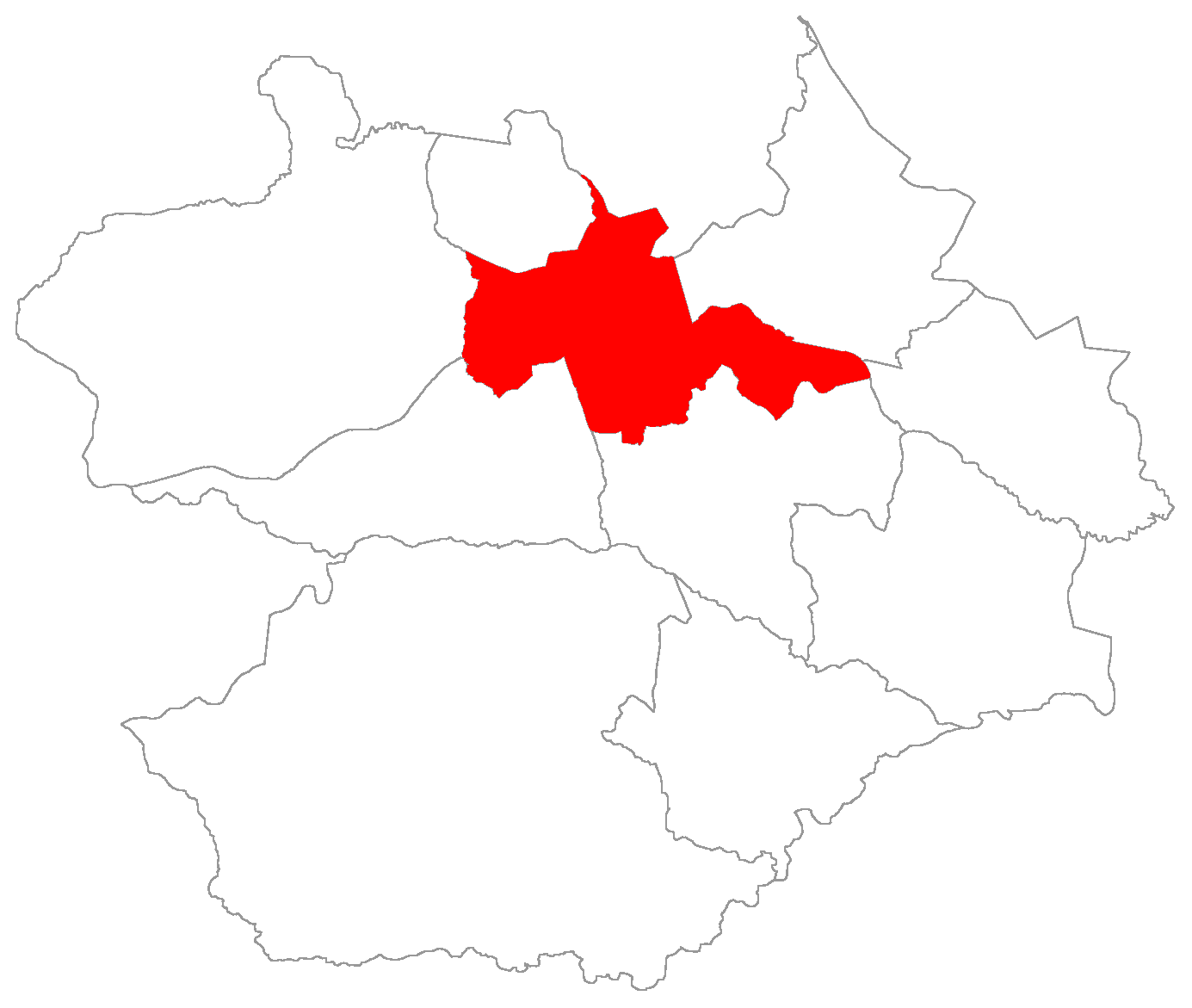
- District of Sede, in Santa Maria City, Rio Grande do Sul, Brazil
- Coordinates: 29°40′25.31″S 53°49′26.87″W
- Country: Brazil
- State: Rio Grande do Sul
- Municipality/City: Santa Maria
- District: District of Sede

Area
  - Total: 0.7516 km^{2} (0.2902 sq mi)

Population
  - Total: 9,801
  - Density: 13,040/km^{2} (33,770/sq mi)
- Postal code: 97.040-020 to 97.043-794
- Adjacent bairros: Carolina, Caturrita, Chácara das Flores, Divina Providência, Nossa Senhora do Perpétuo Socorro.
- Website: Official site of Santa Maria

Salgado Filho is a bairro in the District of Sede in the municipality of Santa Maria, in the Brazilian state of Rio Grande do Sul. It is located in north Santa Maria.

== Villages ==
The bairro contains the following villages: Salgado Filho, Vila Brasília, Vila Kennedy, Vila Norte, Vila Nossa Senhora do Trabalho, Vila Salgado Filho.
