= Caturrita =

- Bairro
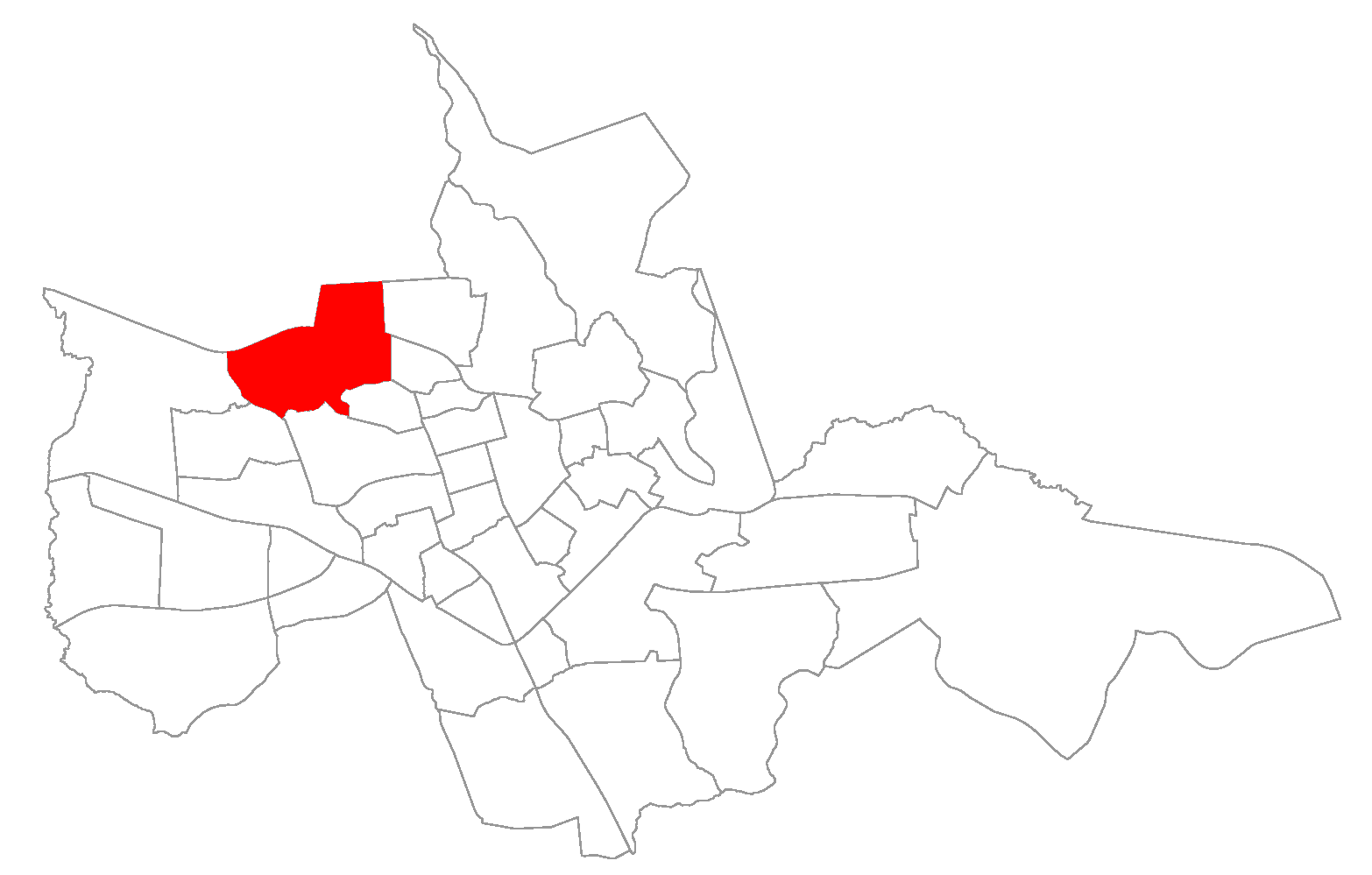
- The bairro in District of Sede

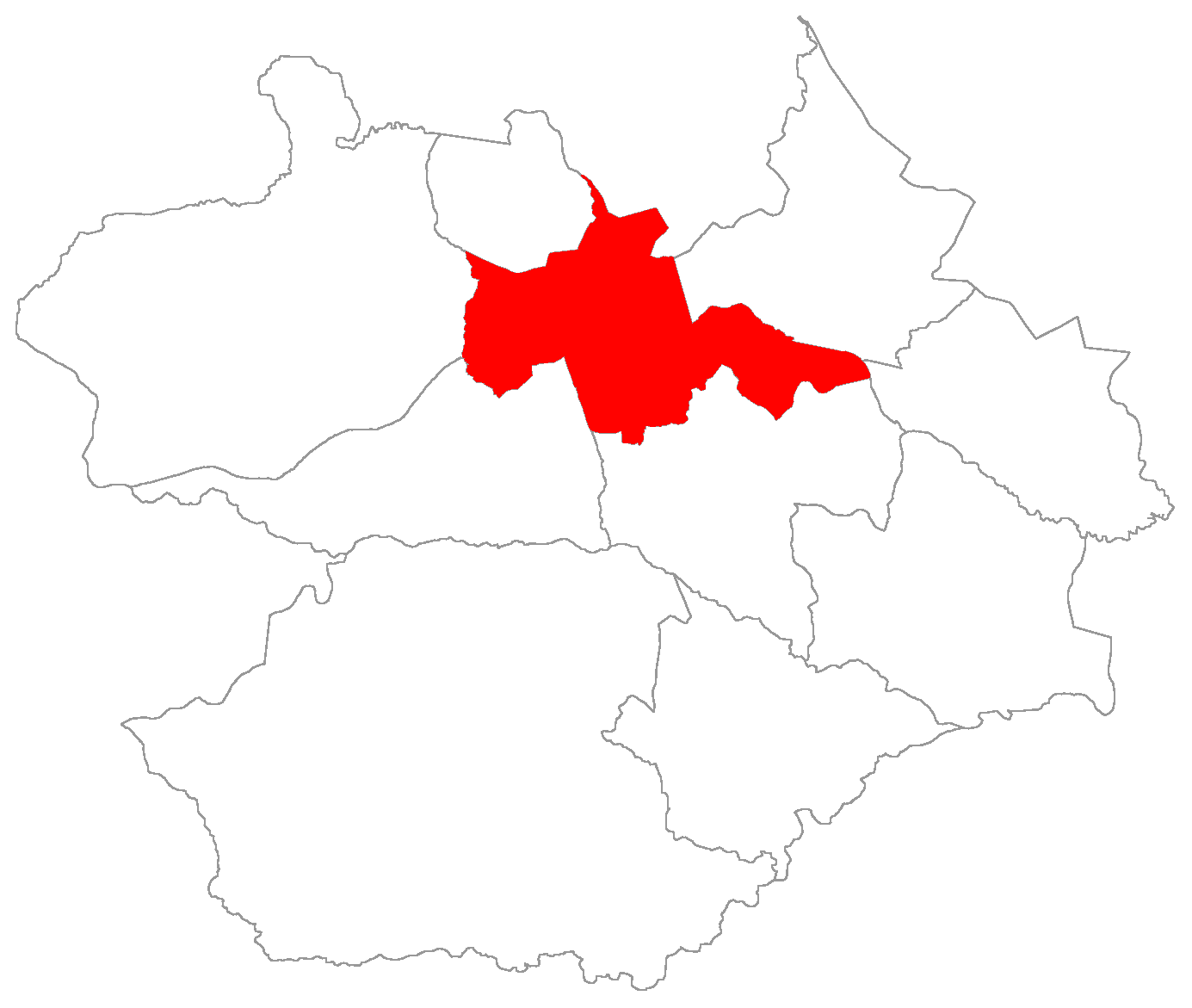
- District of Sede, in Santa Maria City, Rio Grande do Sul, Brazil
- Coordinates: 29°40′13.58″S 53°50′26.15″W
- Country: Brazil
- State: Rio Grande do Sul
- Municipality/City: Santa Maria
- District: District of Sede

Area
  - Total: 3.8756 km^{2} (1.4964 sq mi)

Population
  - Total: 3,211
  - Density: 828.5/km^{2} (2,146/sq mi)
- Postal code: 97.040-000 to 97.040-489
- Adjacent bairros: Agroindustrial, Chácara das Flores, Divina Providência, Nova Santa Marta, Passo d'Areia, Salgado Filho, Santo Antão.
- Website: Official site of Santa Maria

Caturrita ("Monk Parakeet") is a bairro in the District of Sede in the municipality of Santa Maria, in the Brazilian state of Rio Grande do Sul. It is located in north Santa Maria.

== Villages ==
The bairro contains the following villages: Caturrita, Vila Bela União, Vila Jordânia, Vila Negrine, Vila Nossa Senhora da Conceição, Vila Portão Branco, Vila Santa Rita and Vila São José.
