= Chácara das Flores =

- Bairro
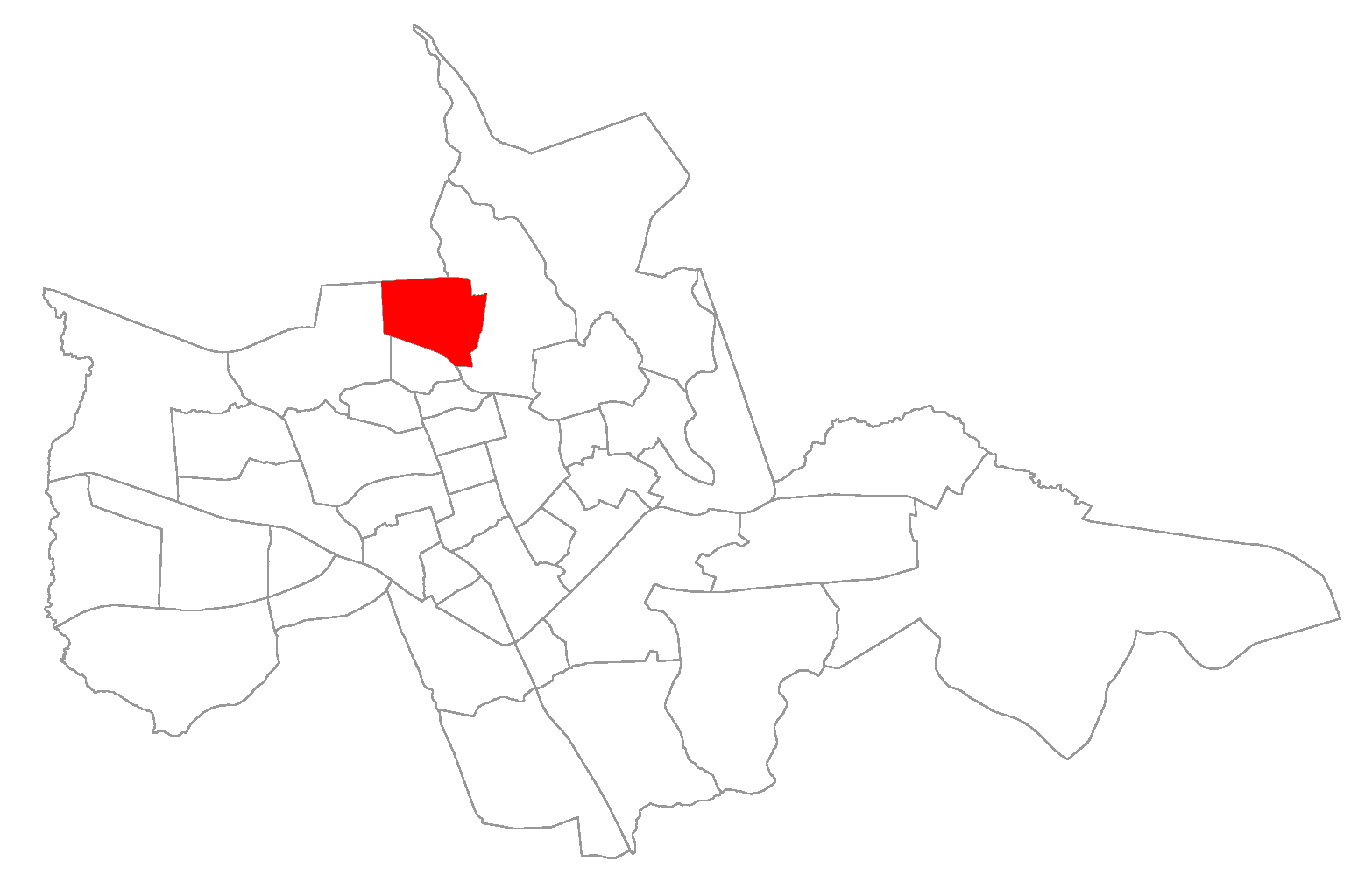
- The bairro in District of Sede

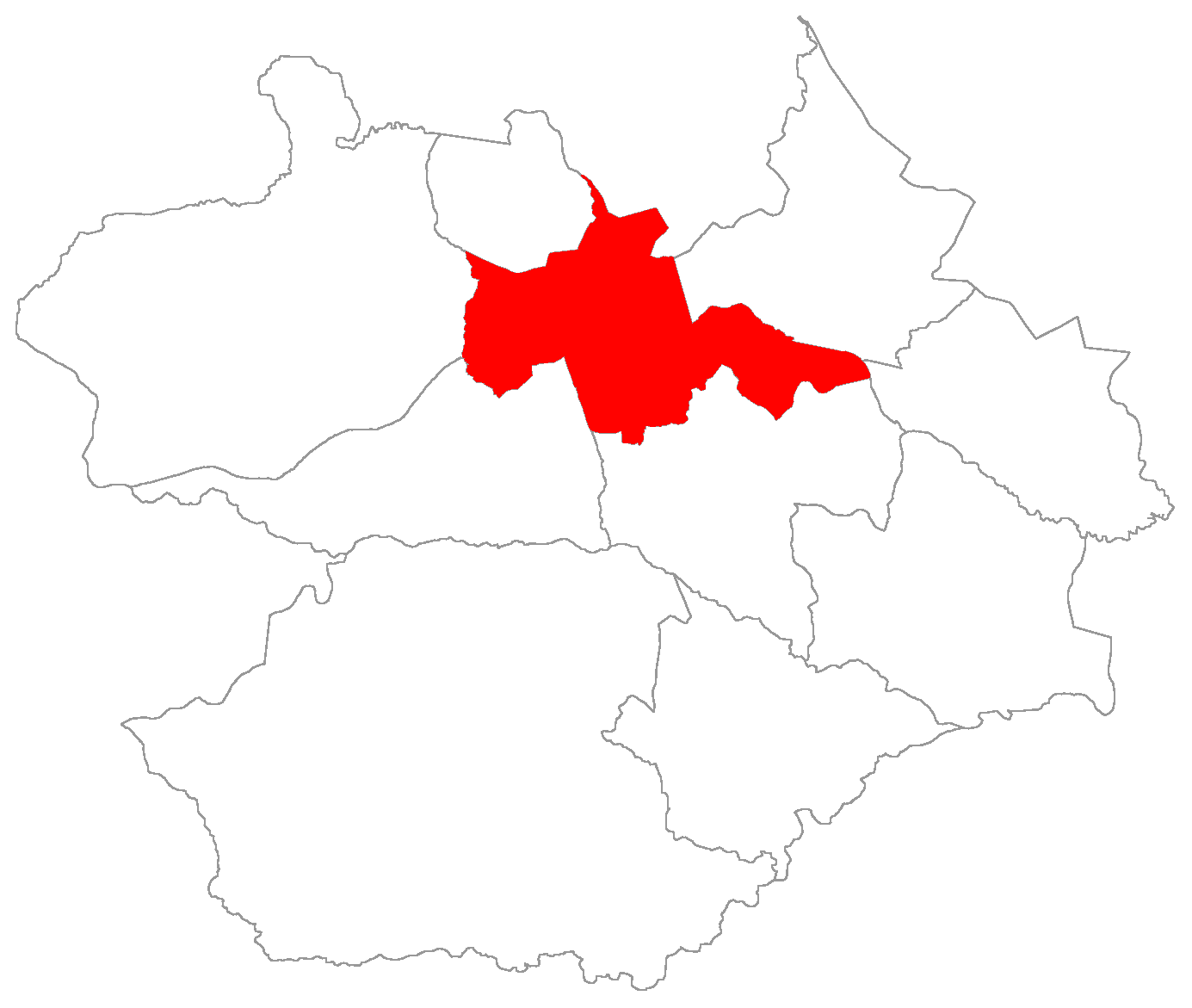
- District of Sede, in Santa Maria City, Rio Grande do Sul, Brazil
- Coordinates: 29°39′49″S 53°49′16″W
- Country: Brazil
- State: Rio Grande do Sul
- Municipality/City: Santa Maria
- District: District of Sede

Area
  - Total: 1.9194 km^{2} (0.7411 sq mi)

Population
  - Total: 3,939
  - Density: 2,052/km^{2} (5,315/sq mi)
- Postal code: 97.040-160 to 97.043-899
- Adjacent bairros: Caturrita, Nossa Senhora do Perpétuo Socorro, Salgado Filho, Santo Antão.
- Website: Official site of Santa Maria

Chácara das Flores ("small farm of flowers") is a bairro in the District of Sede in the municipality of Santa Maria, in the Brazilian state of Rio Grande do Sul. It is located in north Santa Maria.

== Villages ==
The bairro contains the following villages: Balneário das Pedras Brancas, Chácara das Flores, Chácara das Rosas, Desmembramento Fernando Friedrich, Vila Cerro Azul, Vila das Flores, Vila Itagiba, Vila Sant'Anna, Vila Santa Terezinha, Vila São Rafael, Vila Tiarajú, Vila Vitória.

== Gallery of photos ==
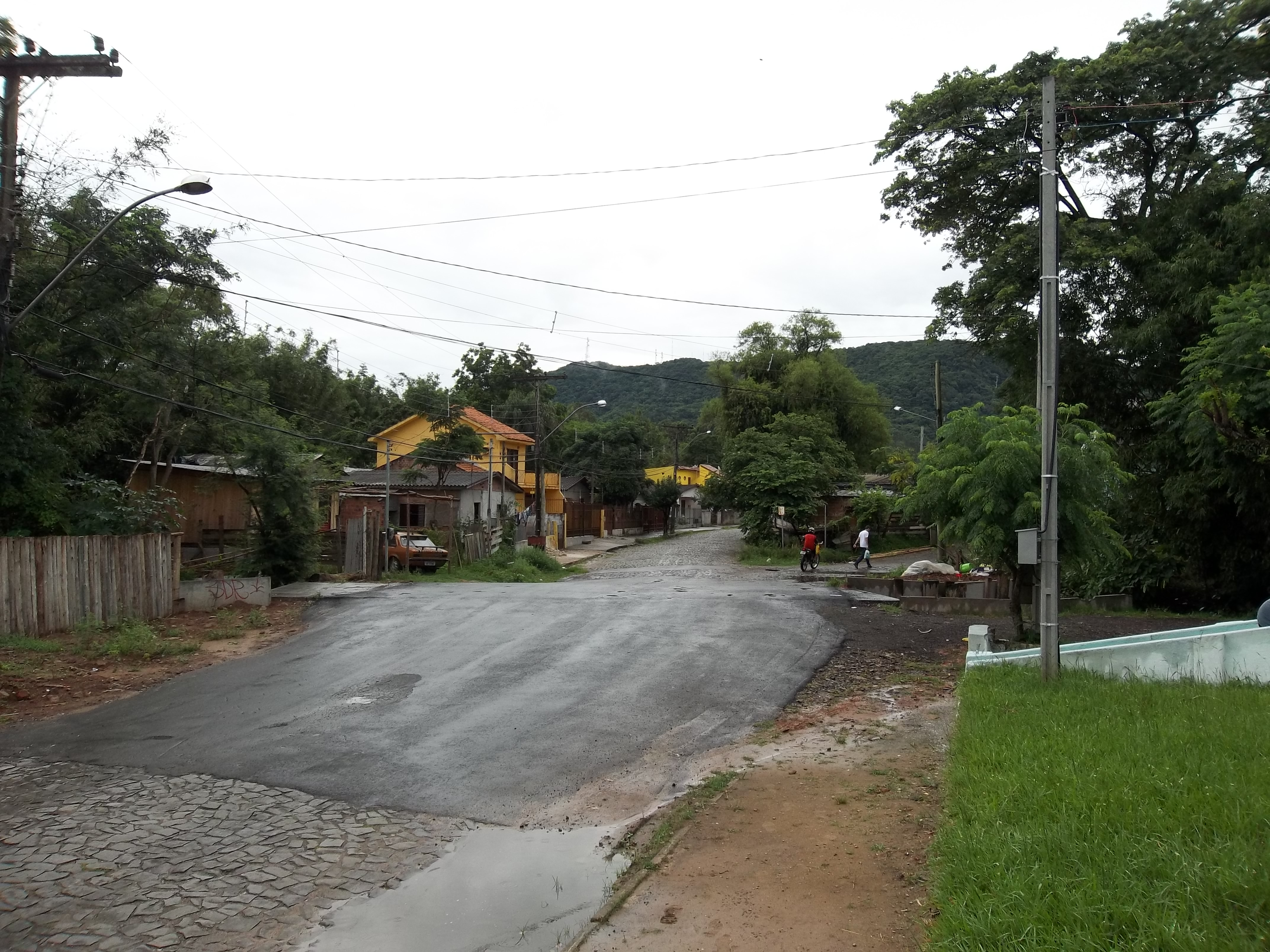
