= Santo Antão, Santa Maria =

Santo Antão
- Bairro
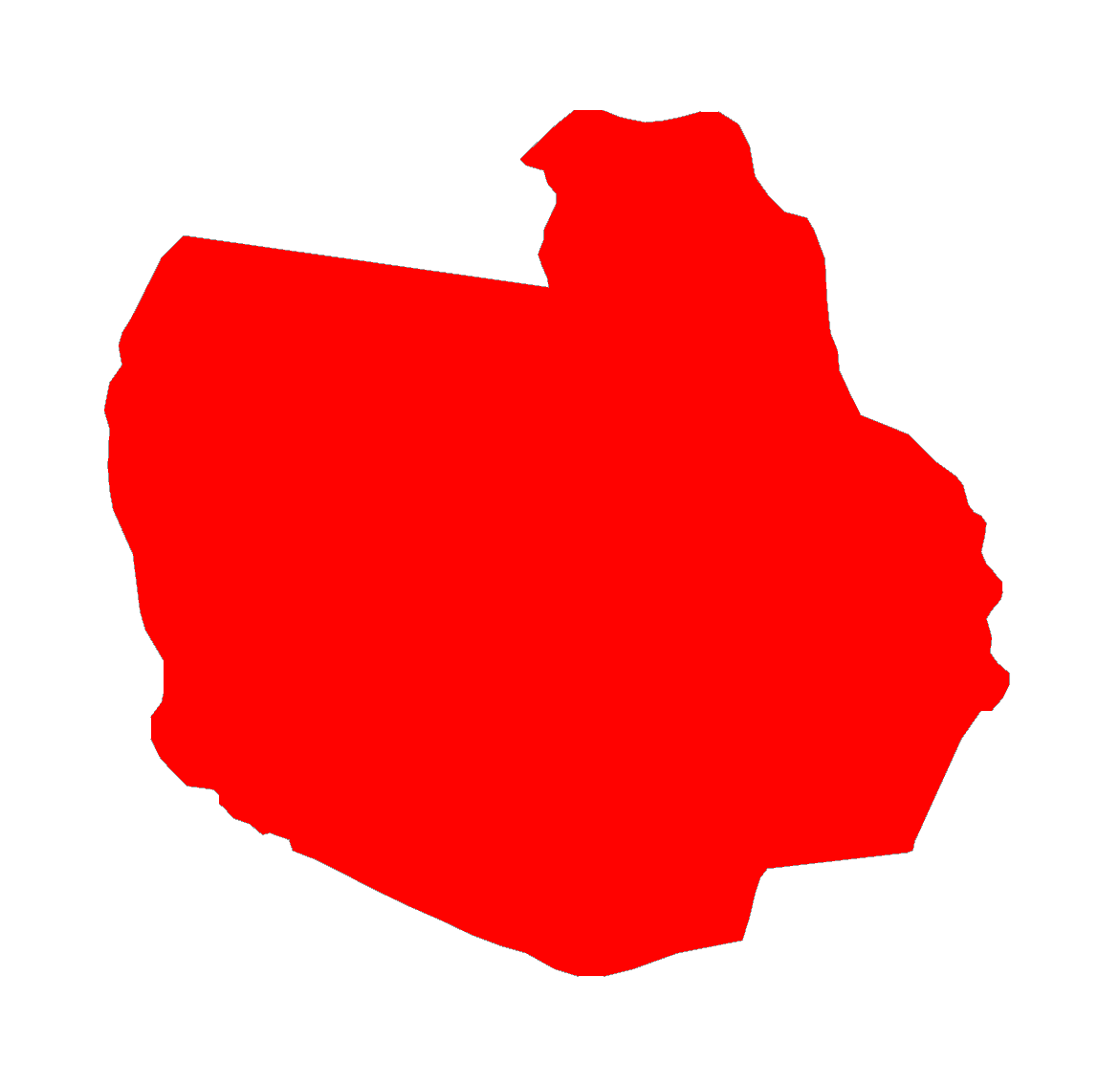
- The bairro in District of Santo Antão

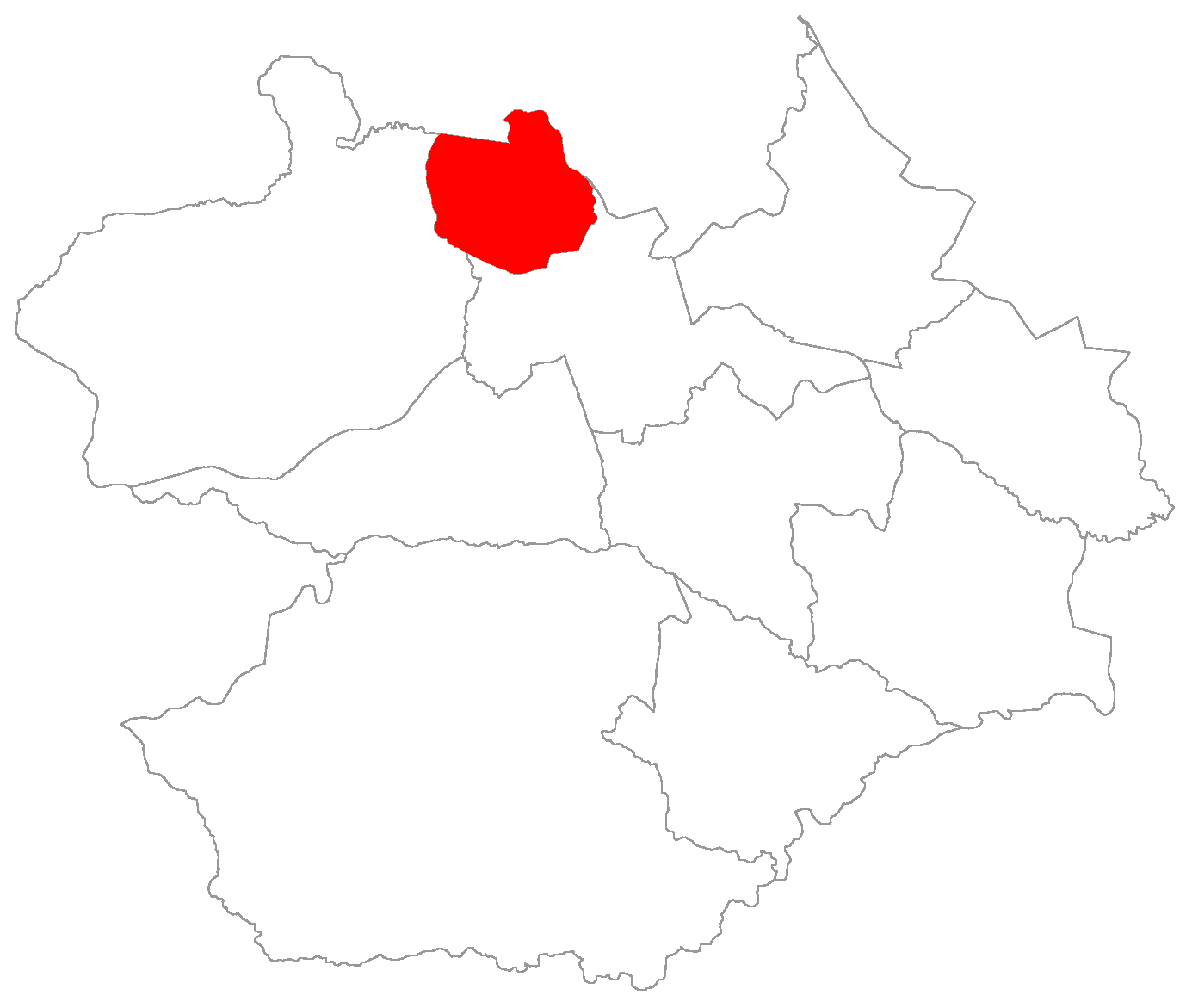
- District of Santo Antão, in Santa Maria City, Rio Grande do Sul, Brazil
- Coordinates: 29°39′25.97″S 53°50′50.08″W
- Country: Brazil
- State: Rio Grande do Sul
- Municipality/City: Santa Maria
- District: District of Santo Antão

Area
  - Total: 51.3300 km^{2} (19.8186 sq mi)

Population
  - Total: 807
  - Density: 15.7/km^{2} (40.7/sq mi)
- Postal code: 97.175-000
- Adjacent bairros: Agroindustrial, Boca do Monte, Campestre do Menino Deus, Caturrita, Chácara das Flores, Nossa Senhora do Perpétuo Socorro.
- Website: Official site of Santa Maria

Santo Antão (Portuguese pronunciation: [ˈsɐ̃tu aˈtaw], "Portuguese for Saint Anthony") is a bairro in the District of Santo Antão in the municipality of Santa Maria, in the Brazilian state of Rio Grande do Sul. It is situated in north of Santa Maria.

== Villages ==
The bairro contains the following villages: Água Negra, Campestre do Divino, Caturrita, Rondinha, Santo Antão, Vila Santo Antão.
