= Nossa Senhora do Perpétuo Socorro =

- Bairro
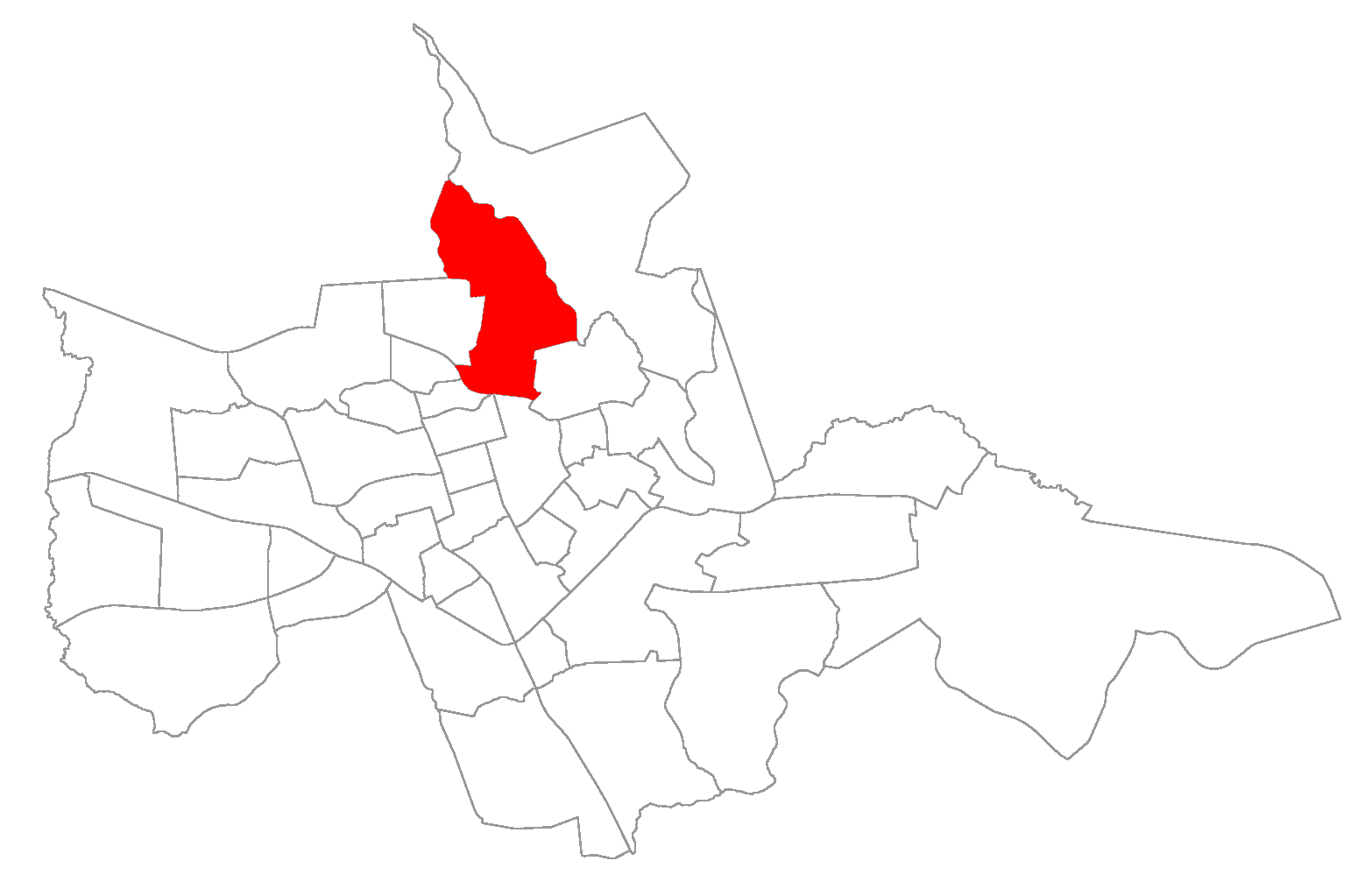
- The bairro in District of Sede

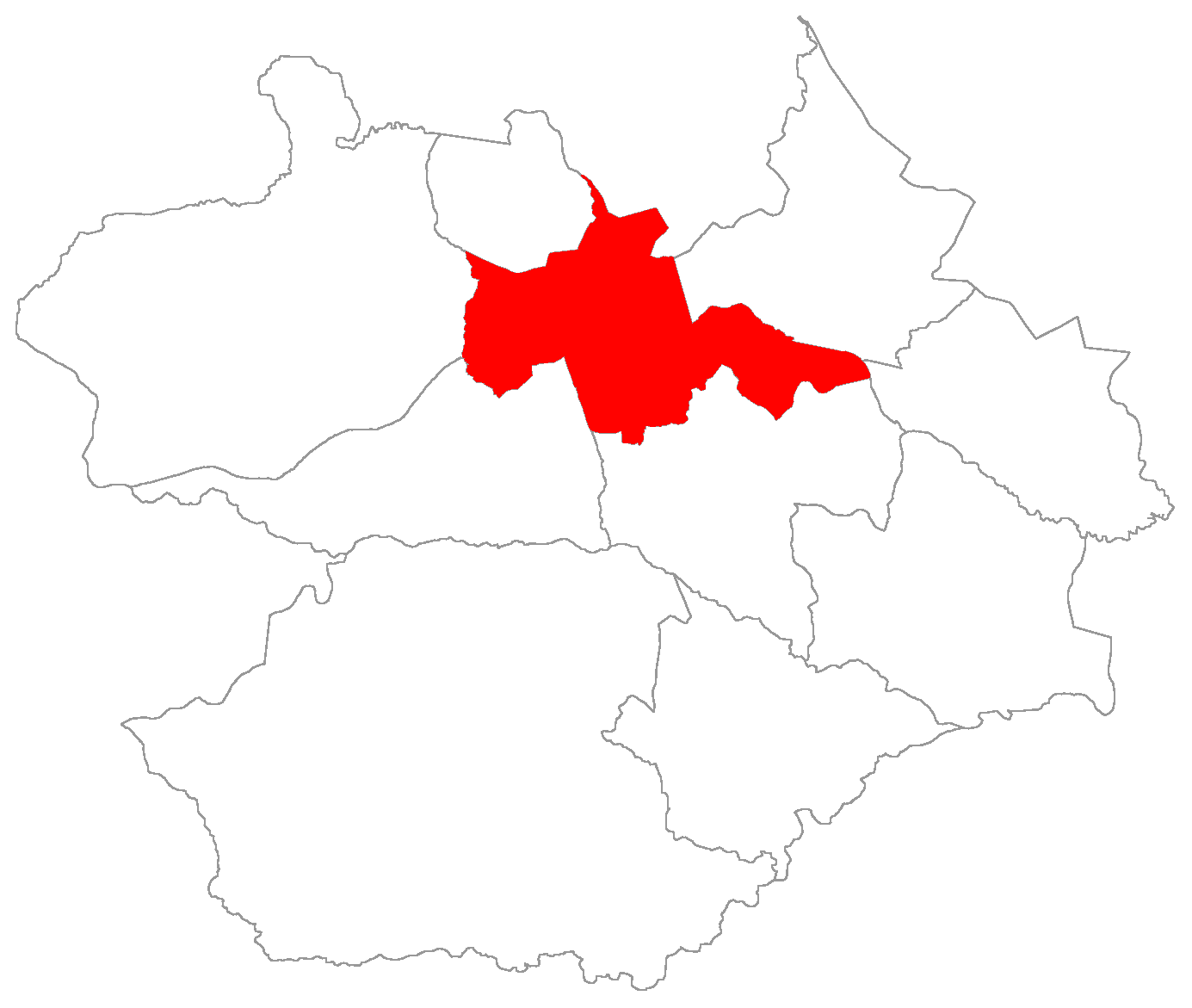
- District of Sede, in Santa Maria City, Rio Grande do Sul, Brazil
- Coordinates: 29°39′48.13″S 53°48′26.44″W
- Country: Brazil
- State: Rio Grande do Sul
- Municipality/City: Santa Maria
- District: District of Sede

Area
  - Total: 4.6943 km^{2} (1.8125 sq mi)

Population
  - Total: 6,151
  - Density: 1,310/km^{2} (3,394/sq mi)
- Postal code: 97.043-100 up to 97.045-899
- Adjacent bairros: Campestre do Menino Deus, Carolina, Centro, Chácara das Flores, Itararé, Nossa Senhora do Rosário, Salgado Filho, Santo Antão.
- Website: Official site of Santa Maria

Nossa Senhora do Perpétuo Socorro ("Our Lady of Perpetual Help") is a bairro in the District of Sede in the municipality of Santa Maria, in the Brazilian state of Rio Grande do Sul. It is located in north Santa Maria.

== Villages ==
The bairro contains the following villages: Perpétuo Socorro, Vila do Carmo, Vila Getúlio Vargas, Vila Jane, Vila Neumayer, Vila Nossa Senhora do Perpétuo Socorro, Vila Tietze.

== Gallery of photos ==
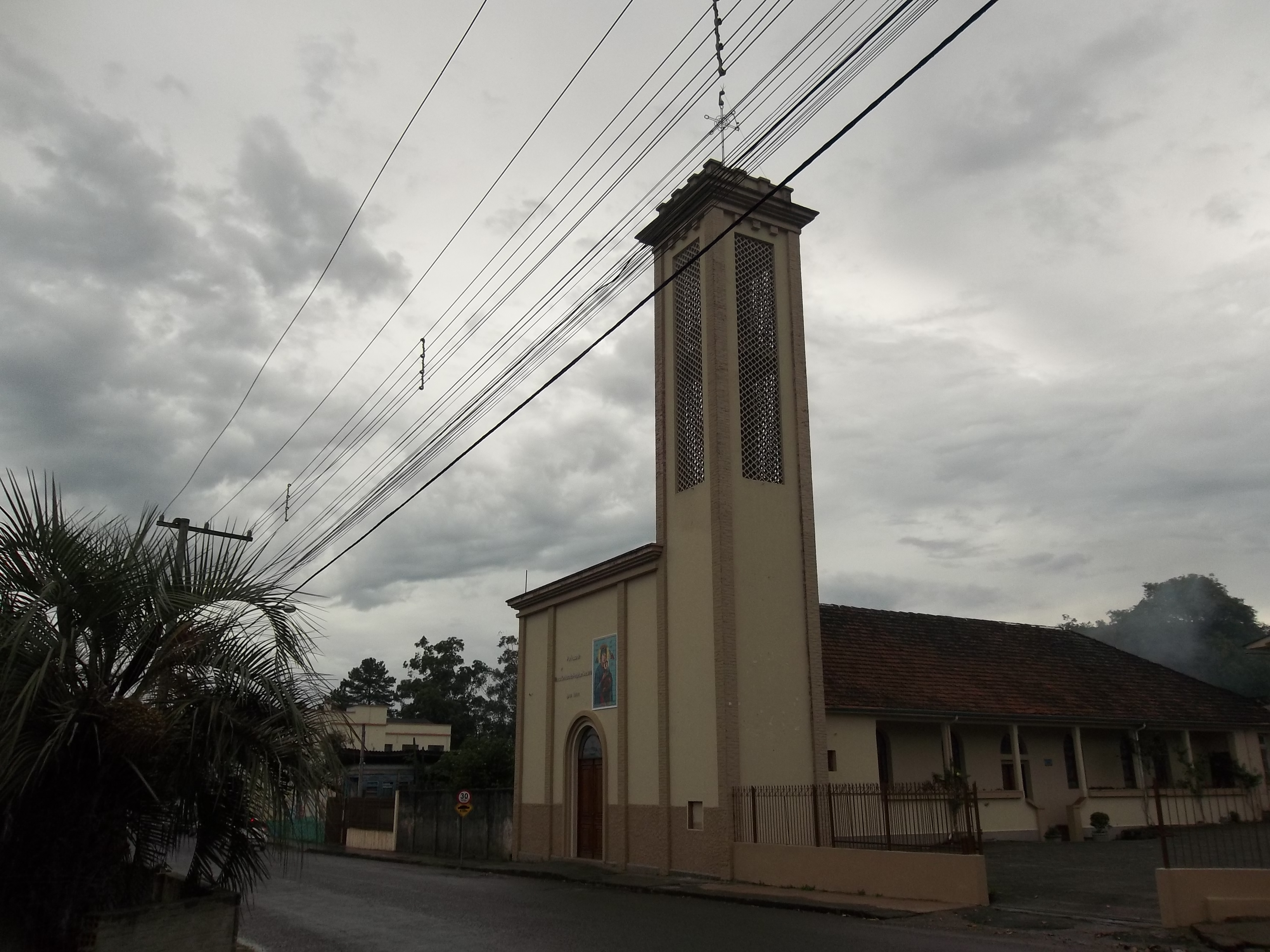

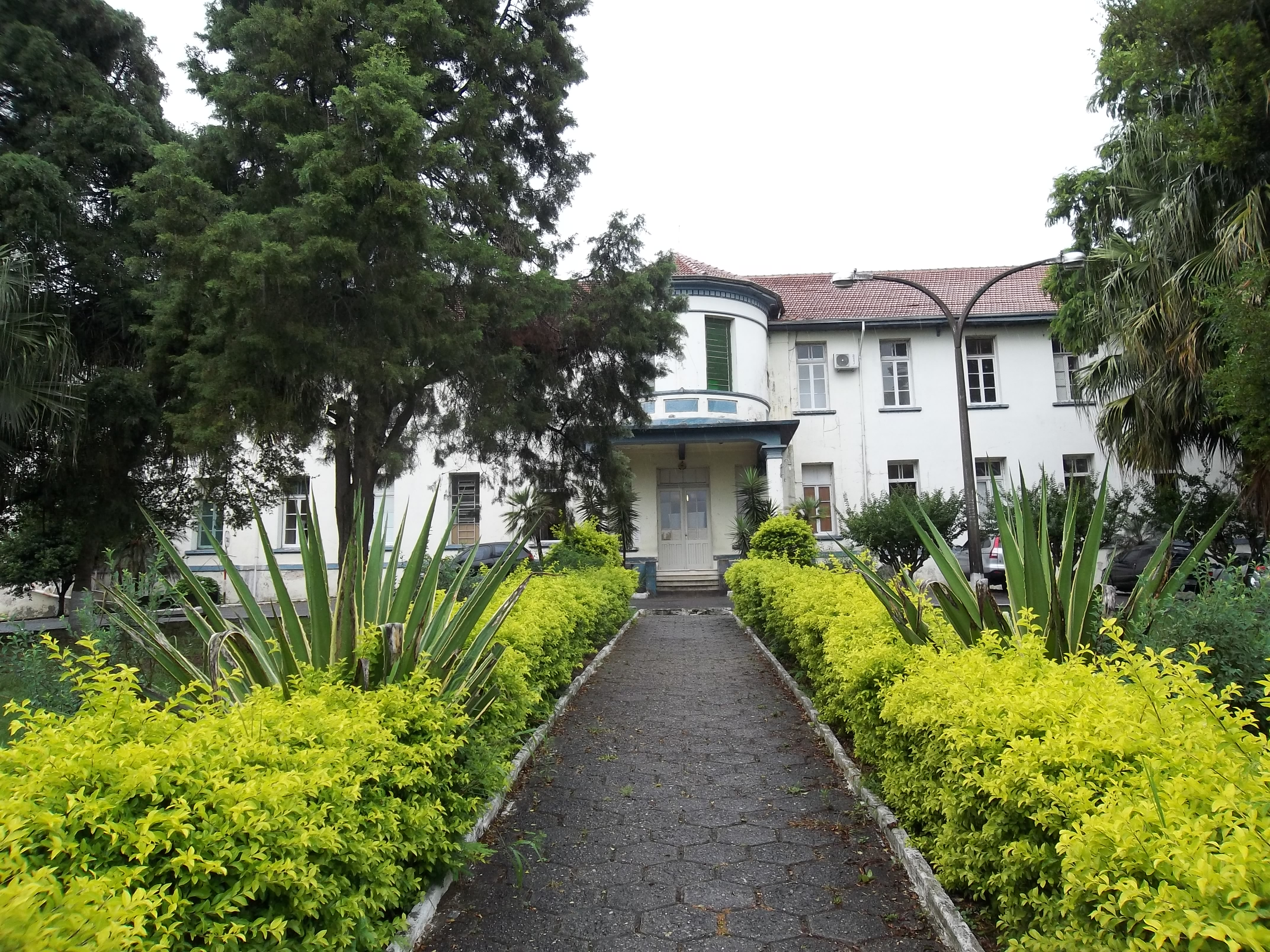

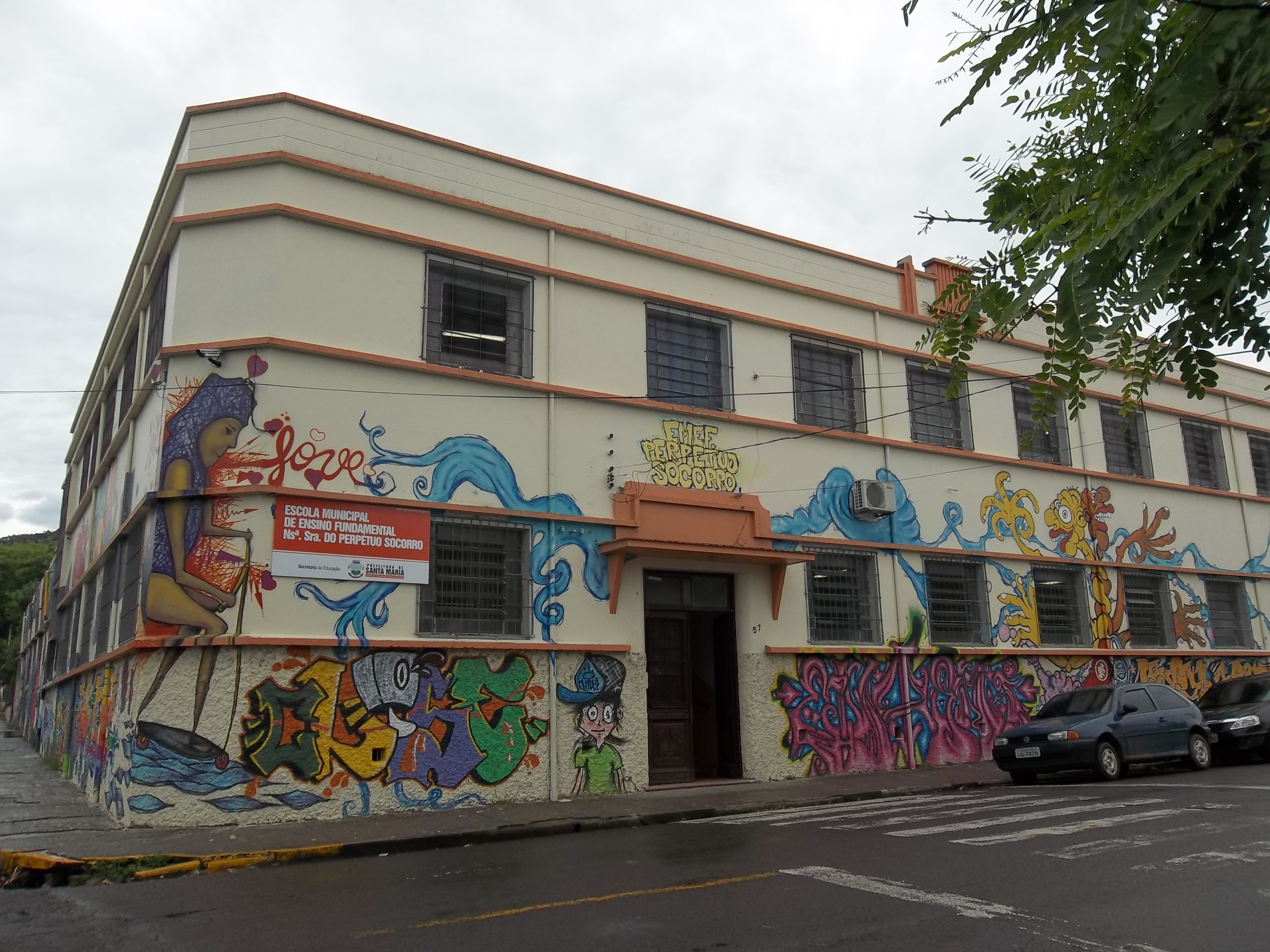
