= Passo d'Areia, Santa Maria =

Passo d'Areia
- Bairro
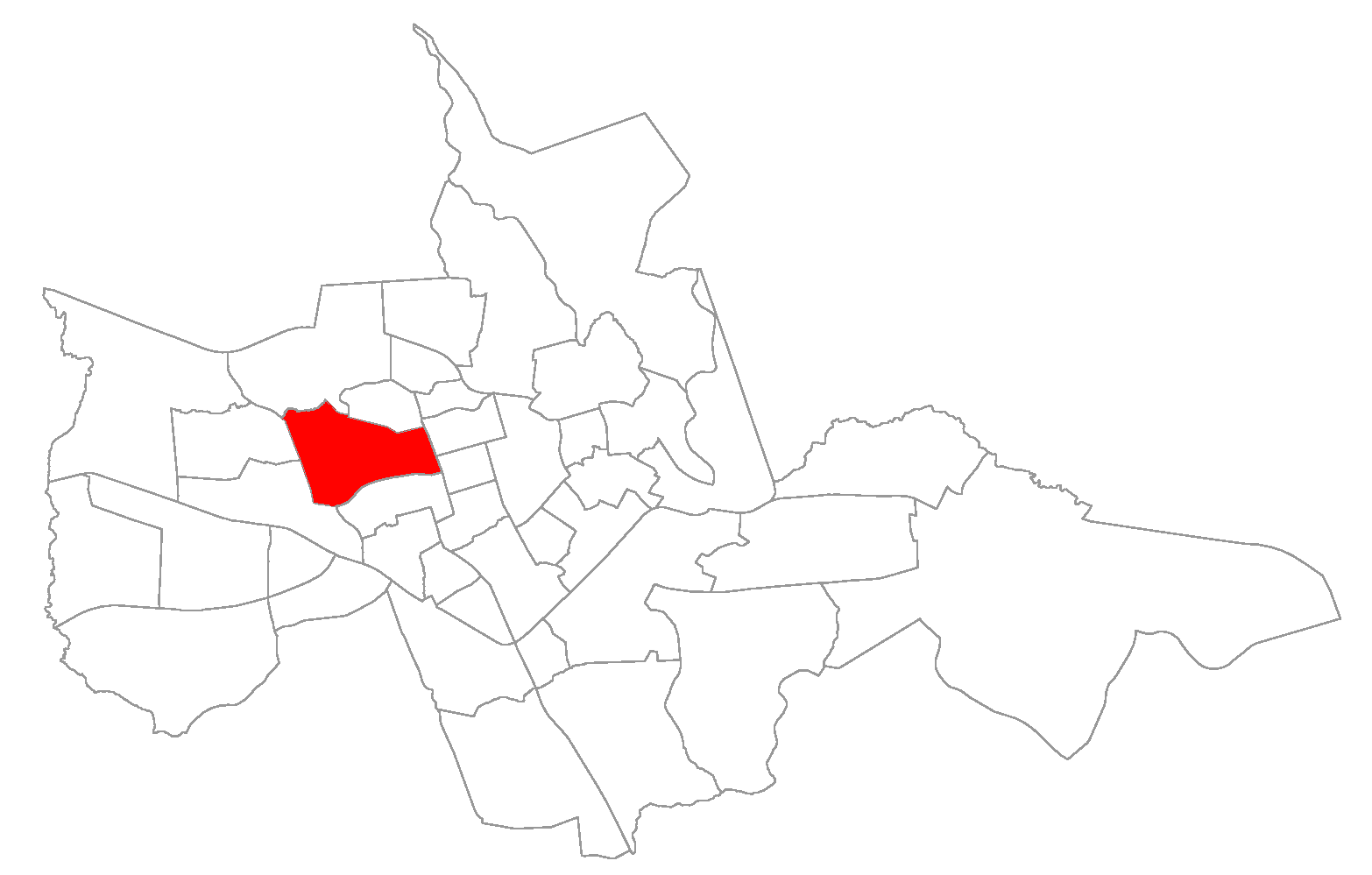
- The bairro in District of Sede

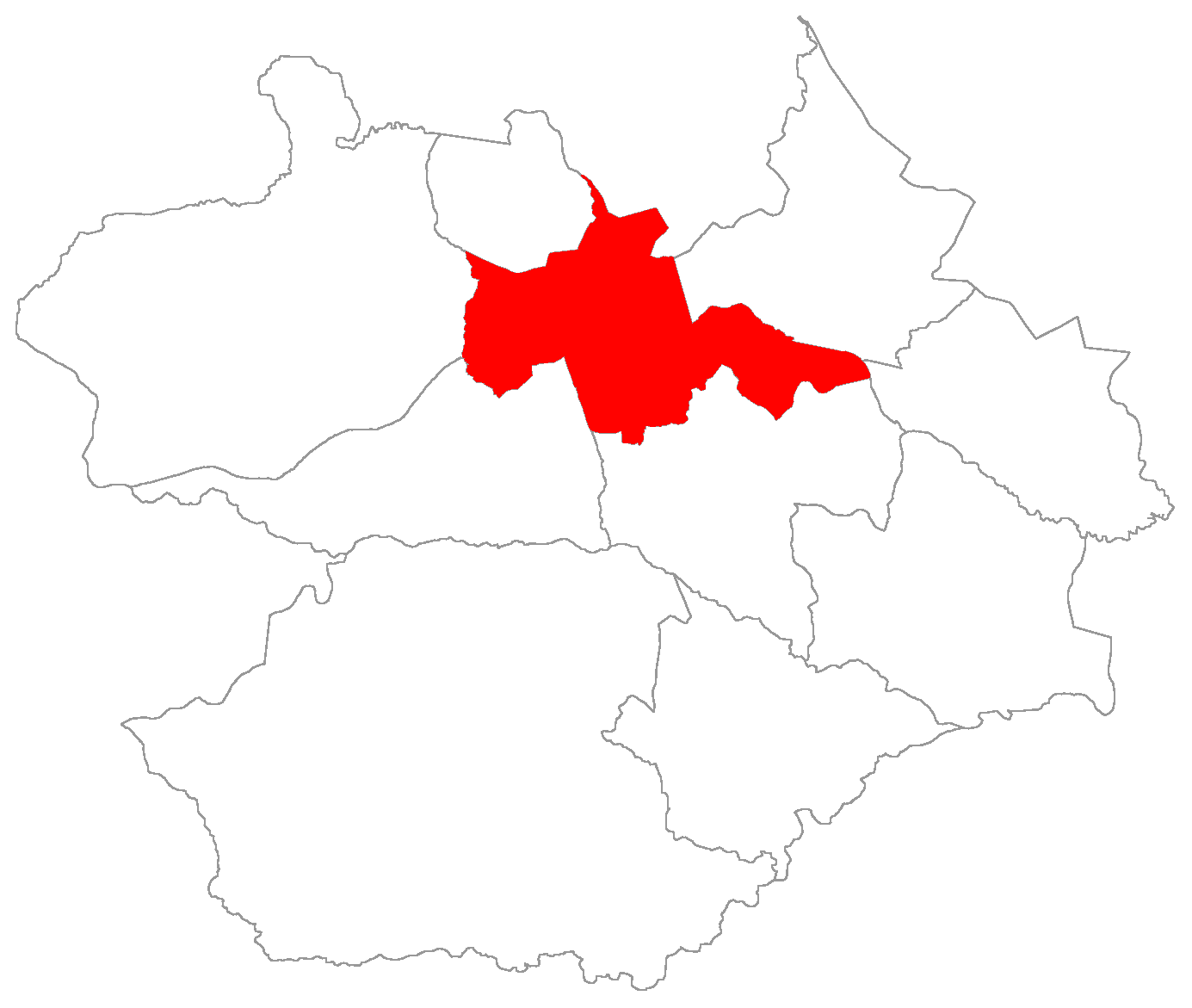
- District of Sede, in Santa Maria City, Rio Grande do Sul, Brazil
- Coordinates: 29°41′14.22″S 53°50′05.69″W
- Country: Brazil
- State: Rio Grande do Sul
- Municipality/City: Santa Maria
- District: District of Sede

Area
  - Total: 2.6781 km^{2} (1.0340 sq mi)

Population
  - Total: 6,995
  - Density: 2,612/km^{2} (6,765/sq mi)
- Postal code: 97.010-210 to 97.020-789
- Adjacent bairros: Bonfim, Caturrita, Divina Providência, Juscelino Kubitschek, Noal, Nossa Senhora do Rosário, Nova Santa Marta.
- Website: Official site of Santa Maria

Passo d'Areia ("sand place") is a bairro in the District of Sede in the municipality of Santa Maria, in the Brazilian state of Rio Grande do Sul. It is located in center-west Santa Maria.

== Villages ==
The bairro contains the following villages: Loteamento Roveda, Passo d'Areia, Vila Independência, Vila Marechal Mallet, Vila Oliveira.

== Gallery of photos ==
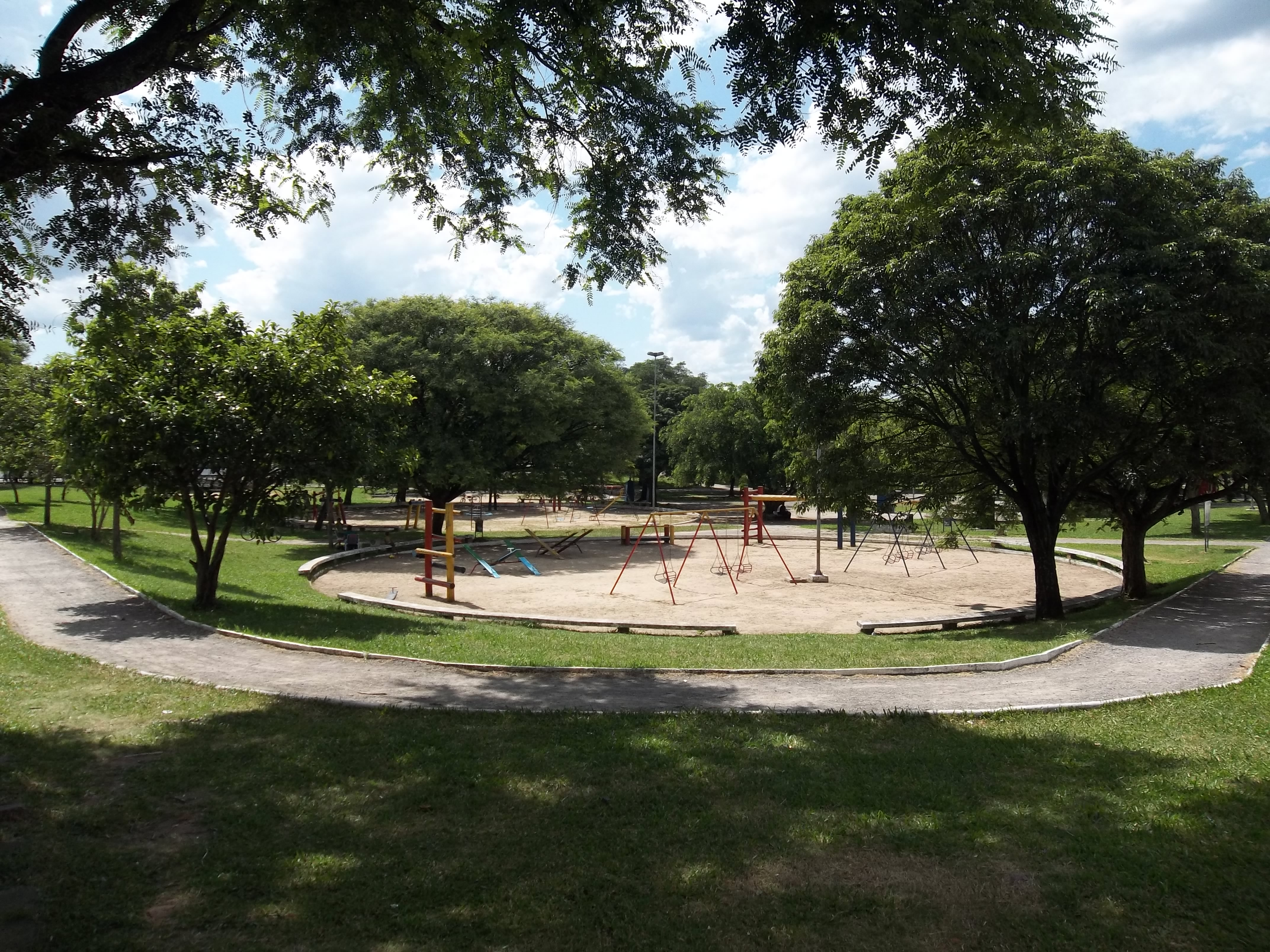

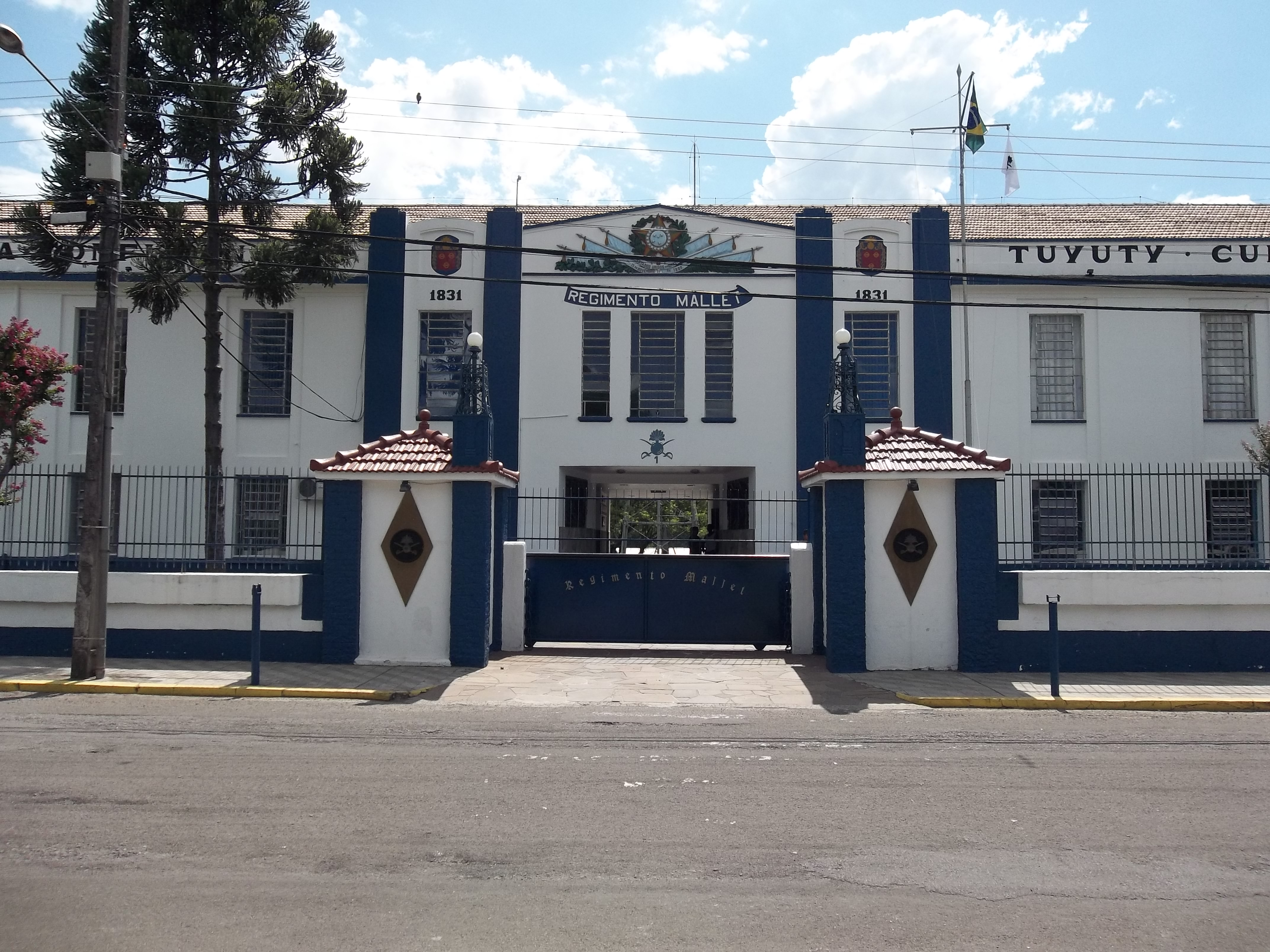

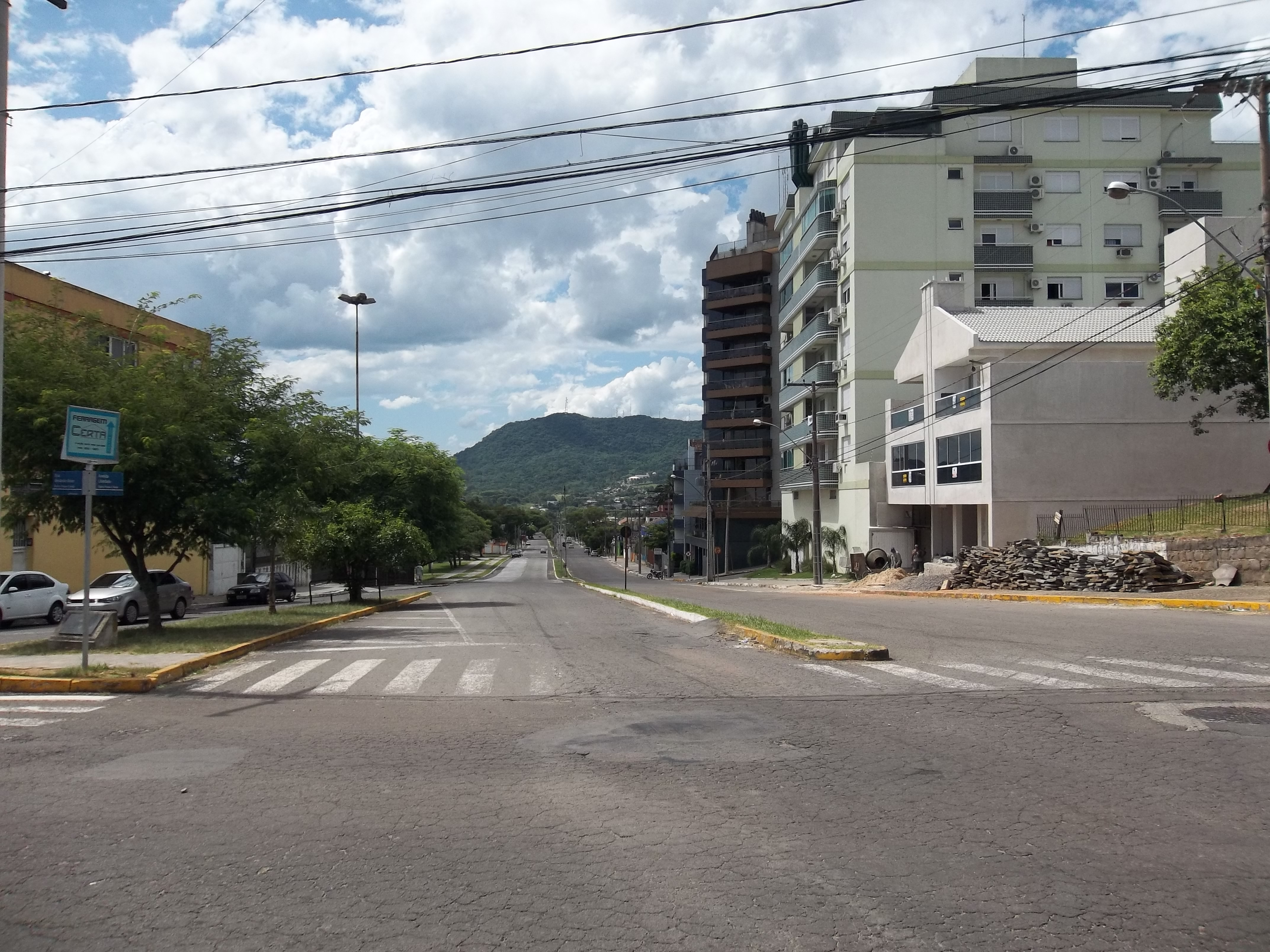
