= Campestre do Menino Deus =

- Bairro
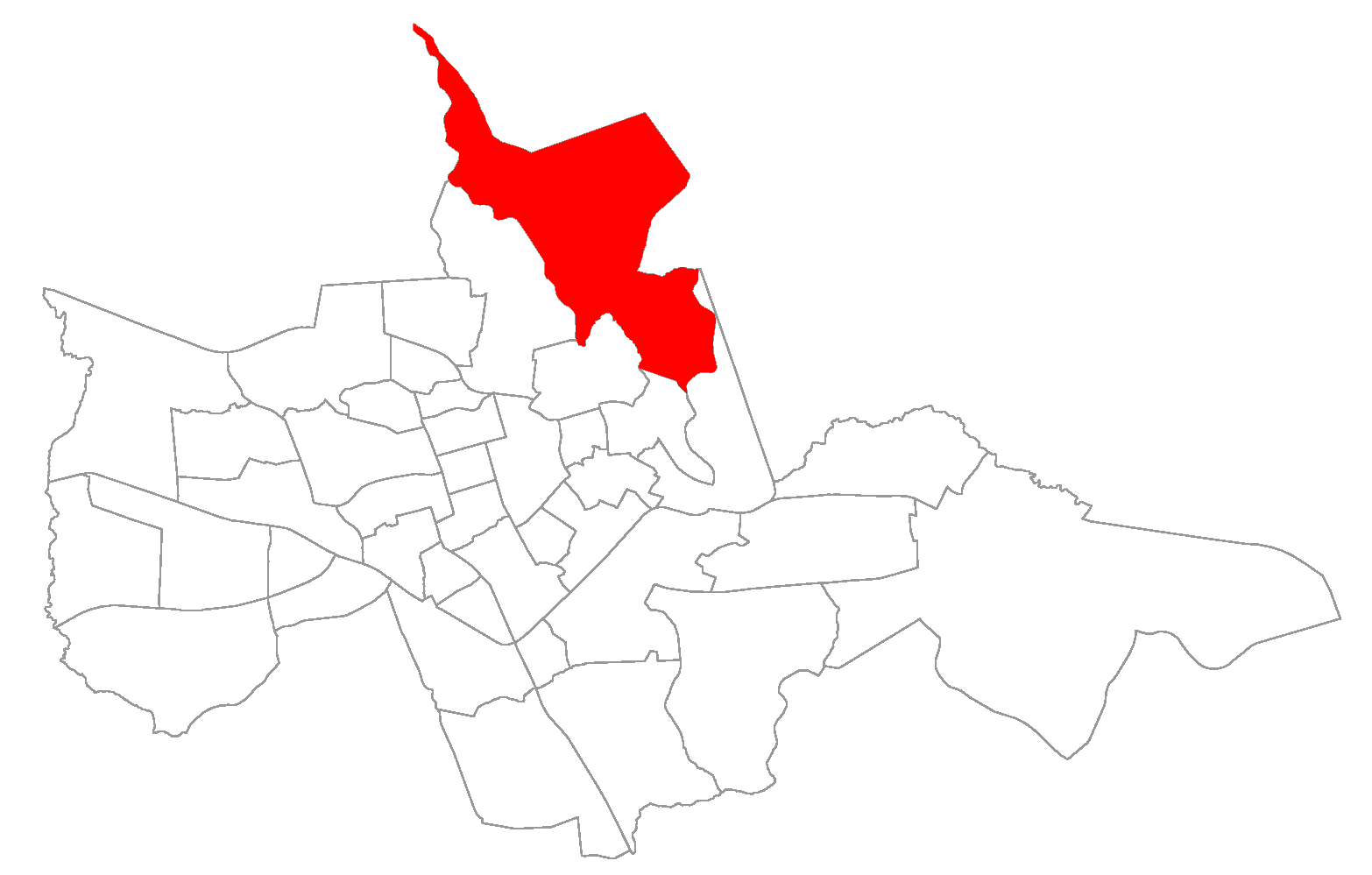
- The bairro in District of Sede

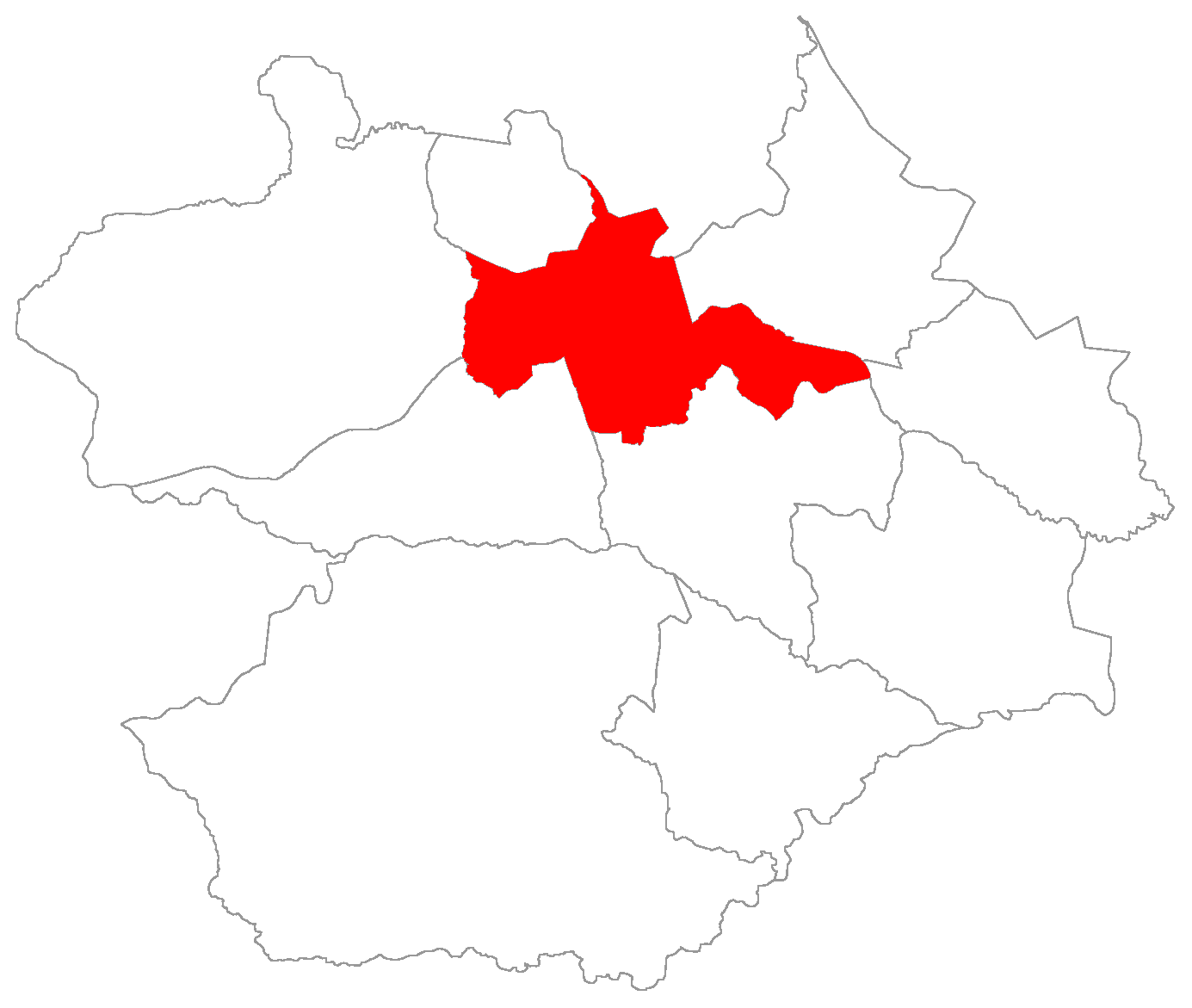
- District of Sede, in Santa Maria City, Rio Grande do Sul, Brazil
- Coordinates: 29°39′20.07″S 53°47′52.61″W
- Country: Brazil
- State: Rio Grande do Sul
- Municipality/City: Santa Maria
- District: District of Sede

Area
  - Total: 10.6396 km^{2} (4.1080 sq mi)

Population
  - Total: 2,697
  - Density: 253.5/km^{2} (656.5/sq mi)
- Postal code: 97.090-070 to 97.090-899
- Adjacent bairros: Itararé, Km 3, Menino Jesus, Nossa Senhora do Perpétuo Socorro, Presidente João Goulart, Santo Antão.
- Website: Official site of Santa Maria

Campestre do Menino Deus ("Campestral of Child God") is a bairro in the District of Sede in the municipality of Santa Maria, in the Brazilian state of Rio Grande do Sul. It is located in north Santa Maria.

== Villages ==
The bairro contains the following villages: Campestre do Menino Deus, Perau, Rincão do Soturno, Vila Dutra, Vila Garibaldi, Vila Menino Deus, Vila Pires.
