= Nossa Senhora do Rosário, Santa Maria =

Nossa Senhora do Rosário
- Bairro
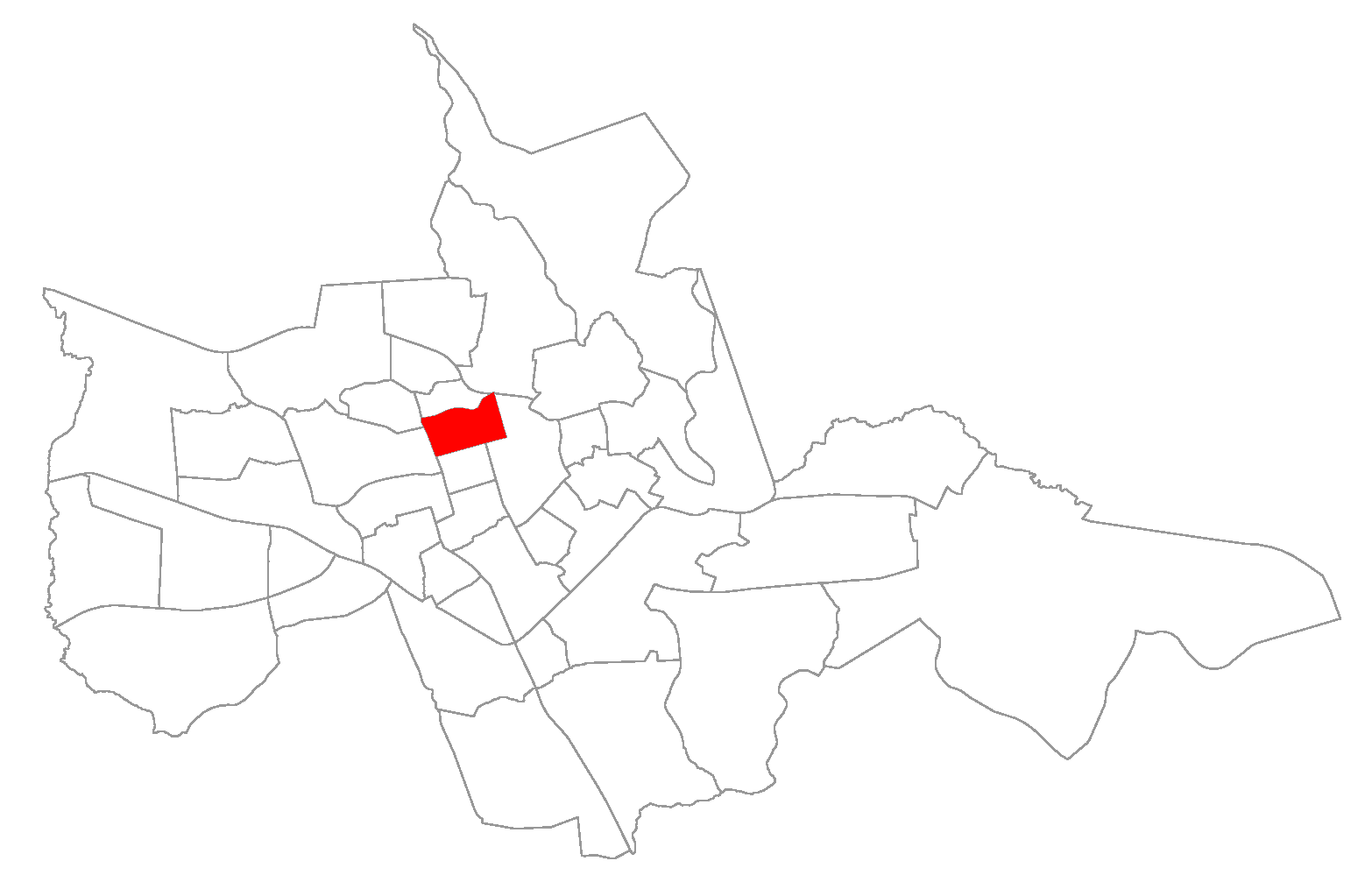
- The bairro in District of Sede

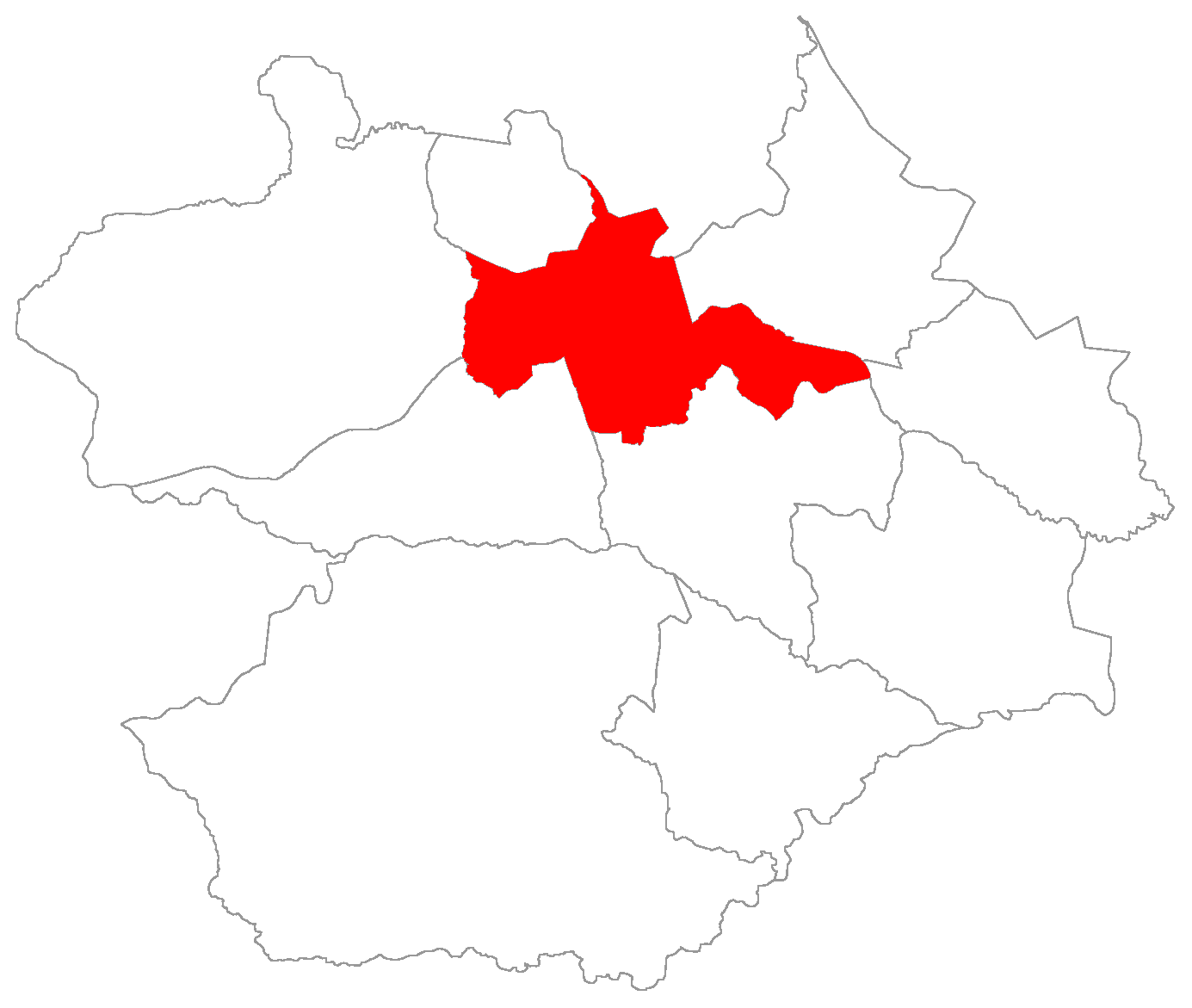
- District of Sede, in Santa Maria City, Rio Grande do Sul, Brazil
- Coordinates: 29°40′58.29″S 53°49′02.07″W
- Country: Brazil
- State: Rio Grande do Sul
- Municipality/City: Santa Maria
- District: District of Sede

Area
  - Total: 0.8455 km^{2} (0.3264 sq mi)

Population
  - Total: 6,769
  - Density: 8,006/km^{2} (20,740/sq mi)
- Postal code: 97.010-010 to 97.010-569
- Adjacent bairros: Bonfim, Carolina, Centro, Divina Providência, Nossa Senhora do Perpétuo Socorro, Passo d'Areia.
- Website: Official site of Santa Maria

Nossa Senhora do Rosário ("Our Lady of the Rosary") is a bairro in the District of Sede in the municipality of Santa Maria, in the Brazilian state of Rio Grande do Sul. It is located in Central Santa Maria.

== Villages ==
The bairro contains the following villages: Beco do Otávio, Loteamento Noêmio Lemos, Rosário, Vila Bortola, Vila Menna Barreto, Vila Oficina Ramos, Vila Osvaldo Beck.

== Gallery of photos ==
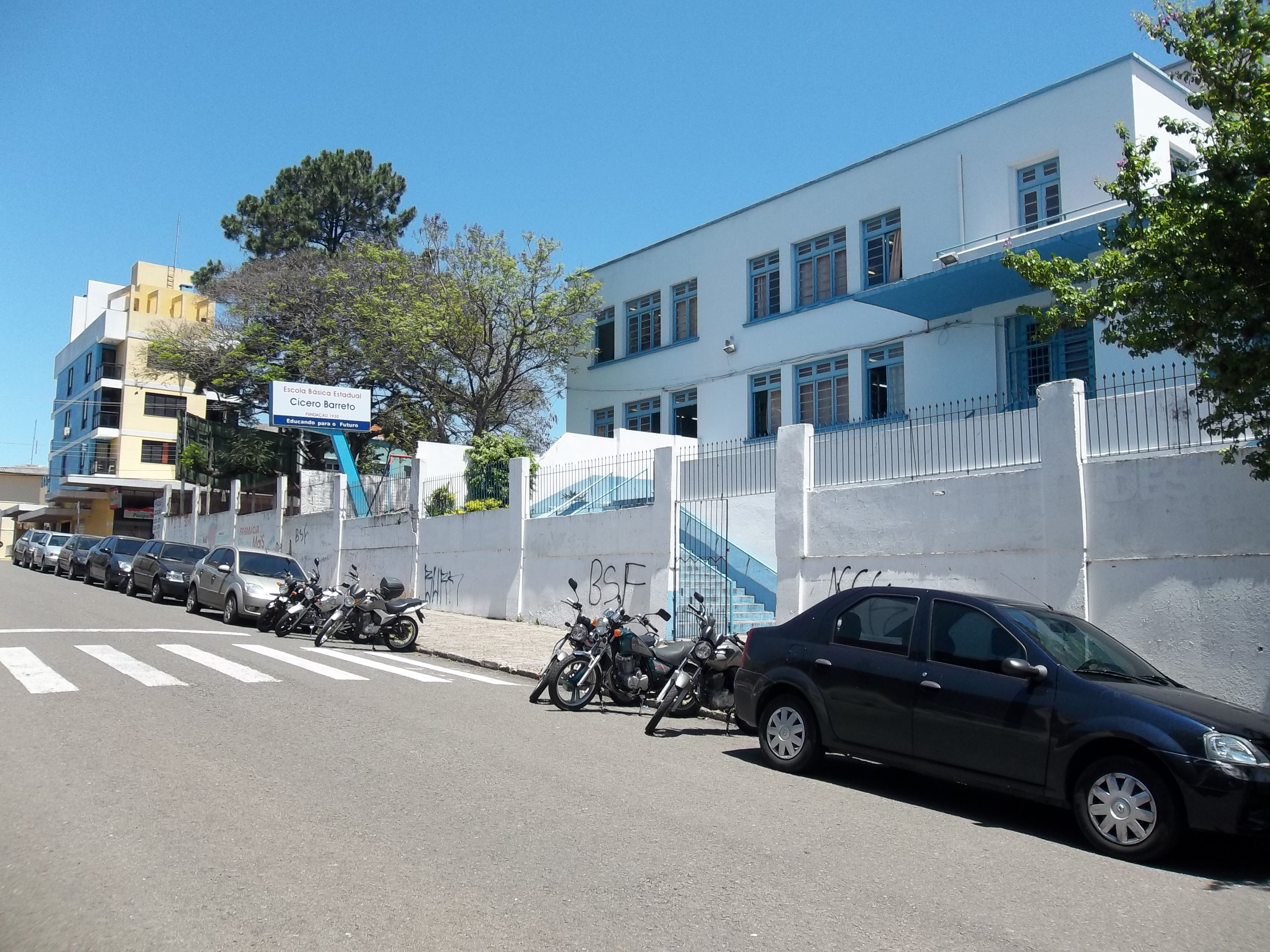

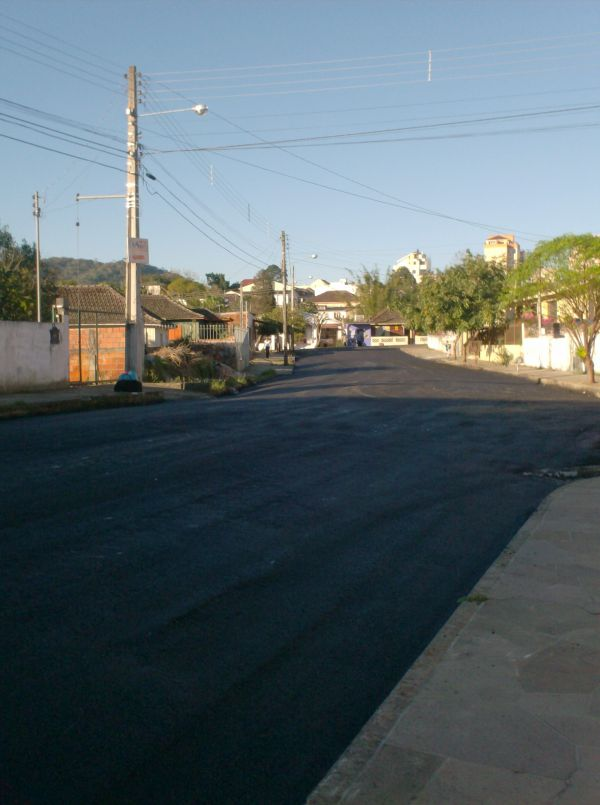

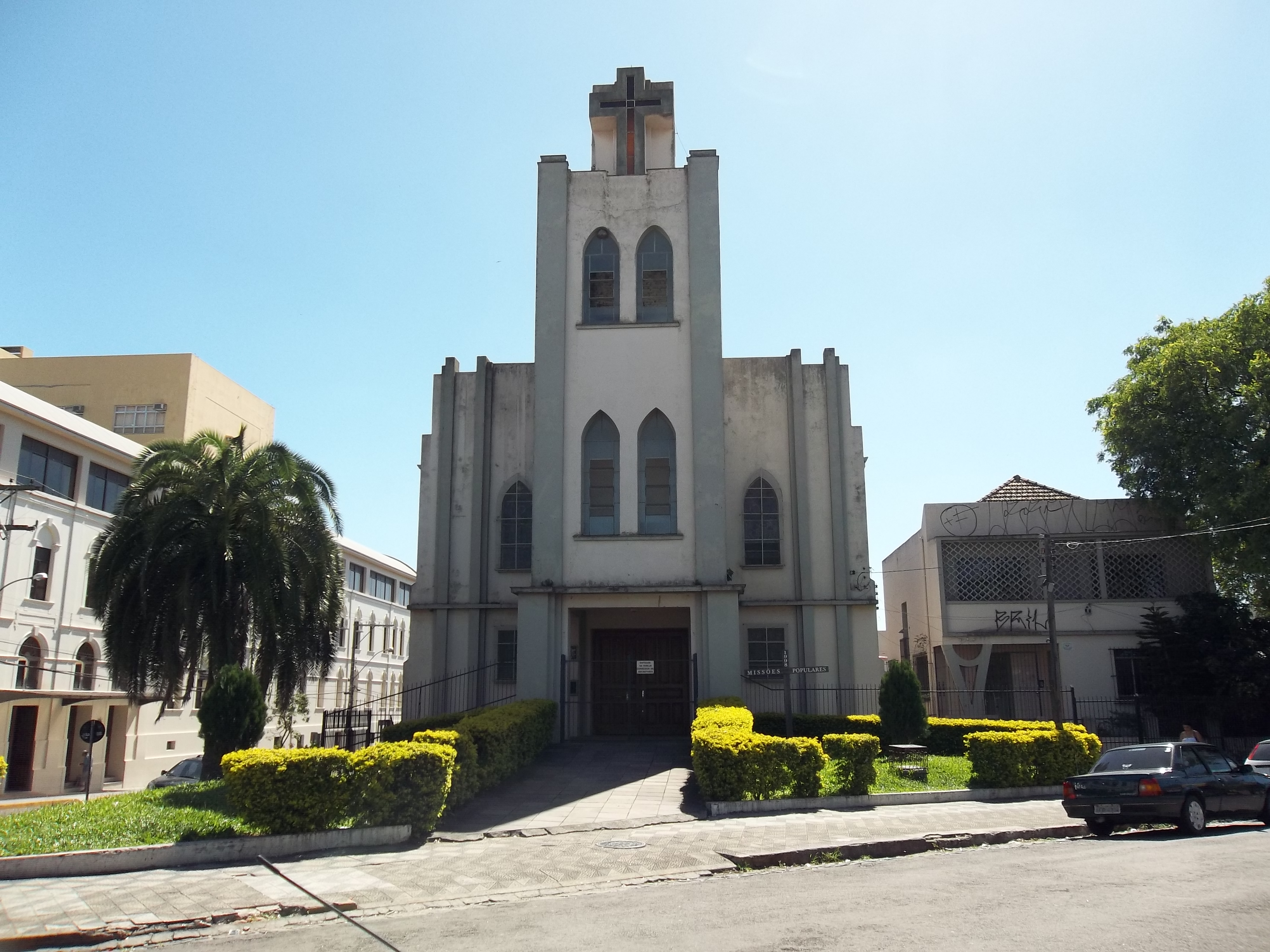
