= Carolina, Santa Maria =

Carolina
- Bairro
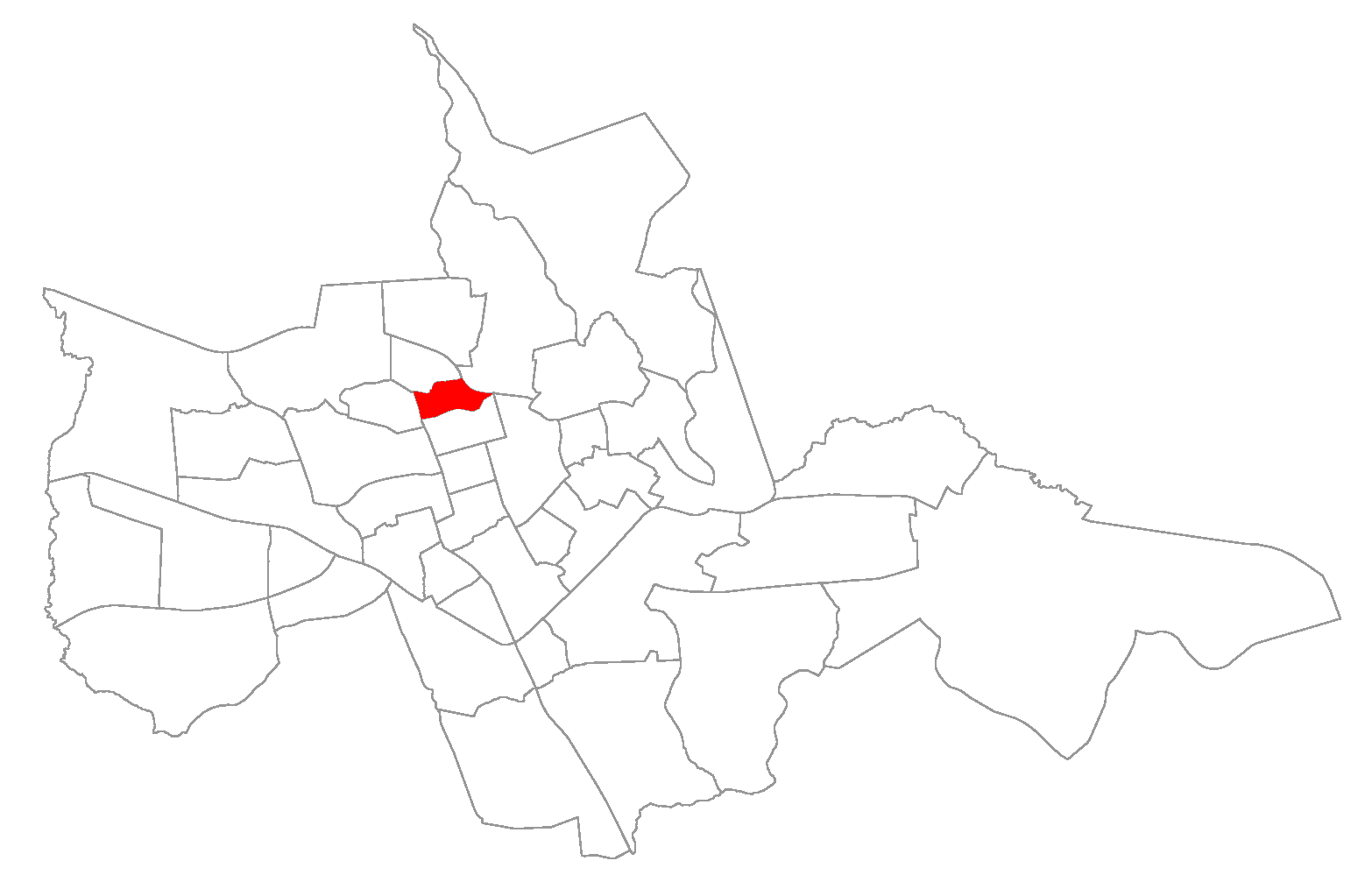
- The bairro in District of Sede

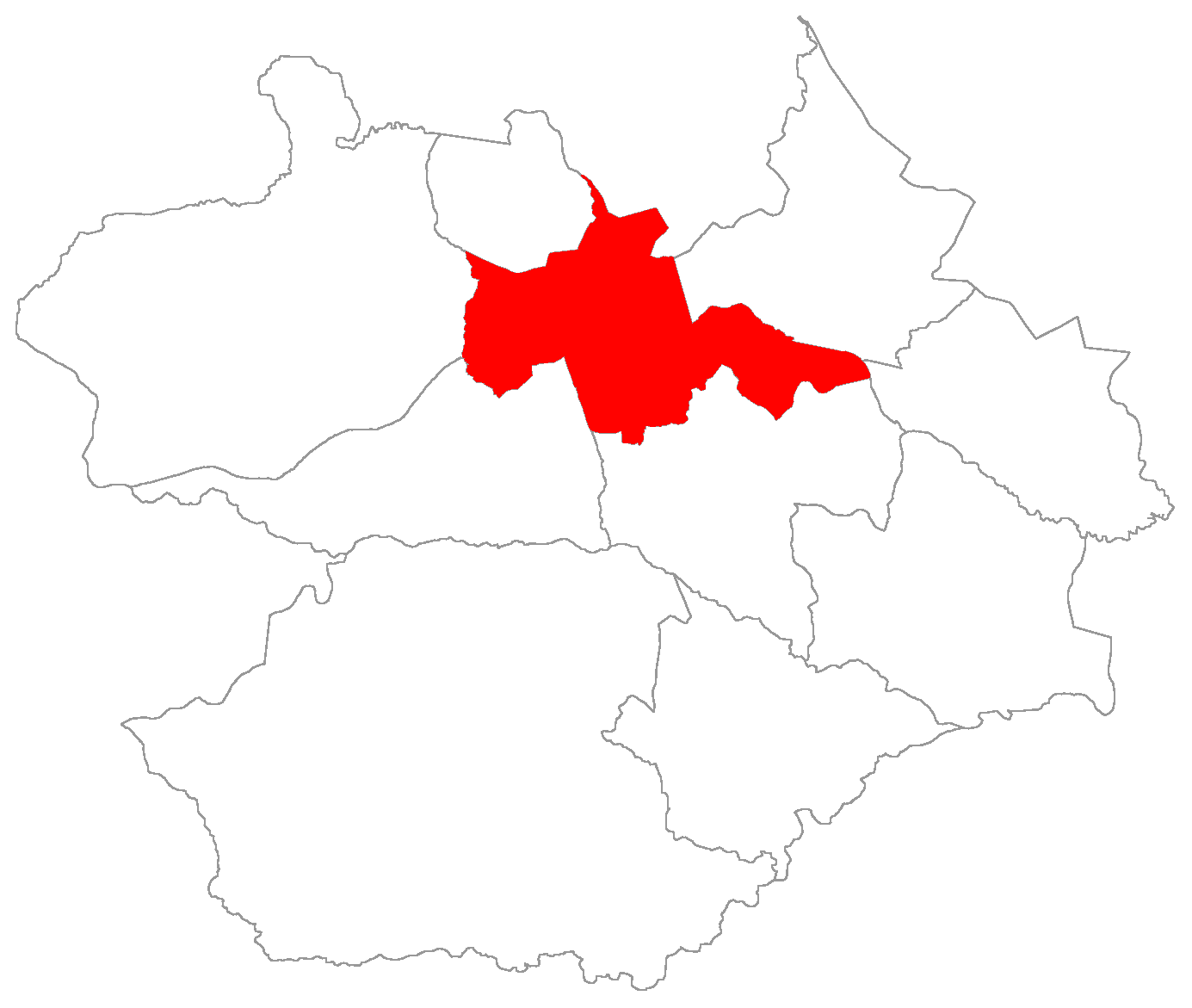
- District of Sede, in Santa Maria City, Rio Grande do Sul, Brazil
- Coordinates: 29°40′38.59″S 53°49′10.52″W
- Country: Brazil
- State: Rio Grande do Sul
- Municipality/City: Santa Maria
- District: District of Sede

Area
  - Total: 0.4821 km^{2} (0.1861 sq mi)

Population
  - Total: 3,356
  - Density: 6,961/km^{2} (18,030/sq mi)
- Postal code: 97.040-040 to 97.043-719
- Adjacent bairros: Divina Providência, Nossa Senhora do Perpétuo Socorro, Nossa Senhora do Rosário, Salgado Filho.
- Website: Official site of Santa Maria

Carolina is a bairro in the District of Sede in the municipality of Santa Maria, in the Brazilian state of Rio Grande do Sul. It is located in north Santa Maria.

== Villages ==
The bairro contains the following villages: Carolina, Vila Carolina and Vila Valdemar Rodrigues.
