= Bairro =

Portuguese word for an area within a town

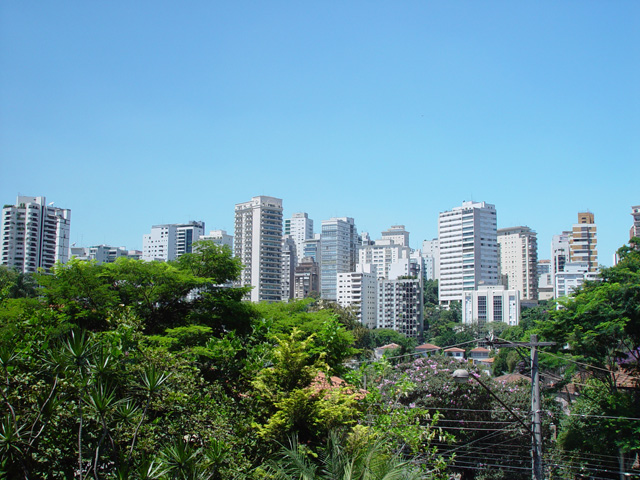
A bairro of São Paulo City.

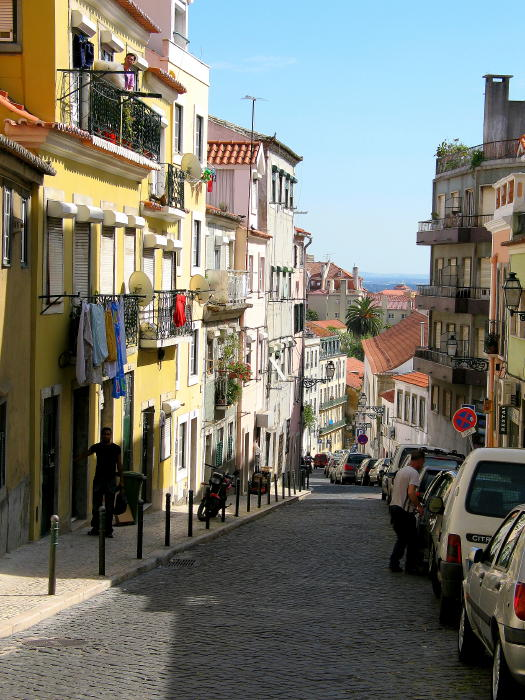
An old bairro in Lisbon.

A bairro (Portuguese pronunciation: [ˈbajʁu]) is a Portuguese word for a quarter or a neighborhood or, sometimes, a district which is within a city or town. It is commonly used in Portugal, Brazil, Mozambique, Guinea-Bissau, and other Portuguese-speaking places. Bairro is cognate with Spanish barrio and Catalan barri, descending from the same Andalusi Arabic word بري or bárri, meaning outskirts or surroundings of a city.

In Brazil, the word is frequently applied to urban areas in cities, in which the bairros are generally defined only unofficially and have rough borders, without any official administrative function. In some cities, however, the bairros have defined territorial limits set by the municipal government, but most follow popular definition by its citizens.

In Portugal, the word is used with the same meaning as in Brazil, defining a non administrative urban area, frequently without clear borders, an example being the Bairro Alto in Lisbon. Occasionally, a Portuguese bairro can coincide with an administrative freguesia (civil parish). In the past, the cities of Lisbon and Porto were divided in large administrative divisions - each encompassing several freguesias - which were also named bairros.

In Mozambique, bairros are administrative subdivisions of urban districts with important functions in the identification of the residents and determine the attributes of the area in regard to construction or agriculture, much like zoning. They are directed by secretários.

In Guinea-Bissau, bairros are first the peri-urban quarters of the capital Bissau beyond the old city centre (Praça), e.g. Bairro de Ajuda, Bairro Militar, Pessak, Quelele, Luanda, Mpantcha, and by extension quarters of smaller towns throughout the country.

In Timor-Leste, bairros (Tetum: bairru) are neighborhoods or residential areas within a city, village, or other community. Bairros are an informal term with no formal administrative function; Timor-Leste's third- and fourth-level administrative divisions consist of sucos (villages) and aldeias (sub-villages or hamlets).

== See also ==
- Bairro Alto in Lisbon
- Barrio
- Freguesia
