= Administrative divisions of Santa Maria, Rio Grande do Sul =

This is a list of the administrative divisions of the municipality of Santa Maria, in the Brazilian state of Rio Grande do Sul.

== Districts ==
The municipality is divided into 10 districts (Portuguese: distritos):

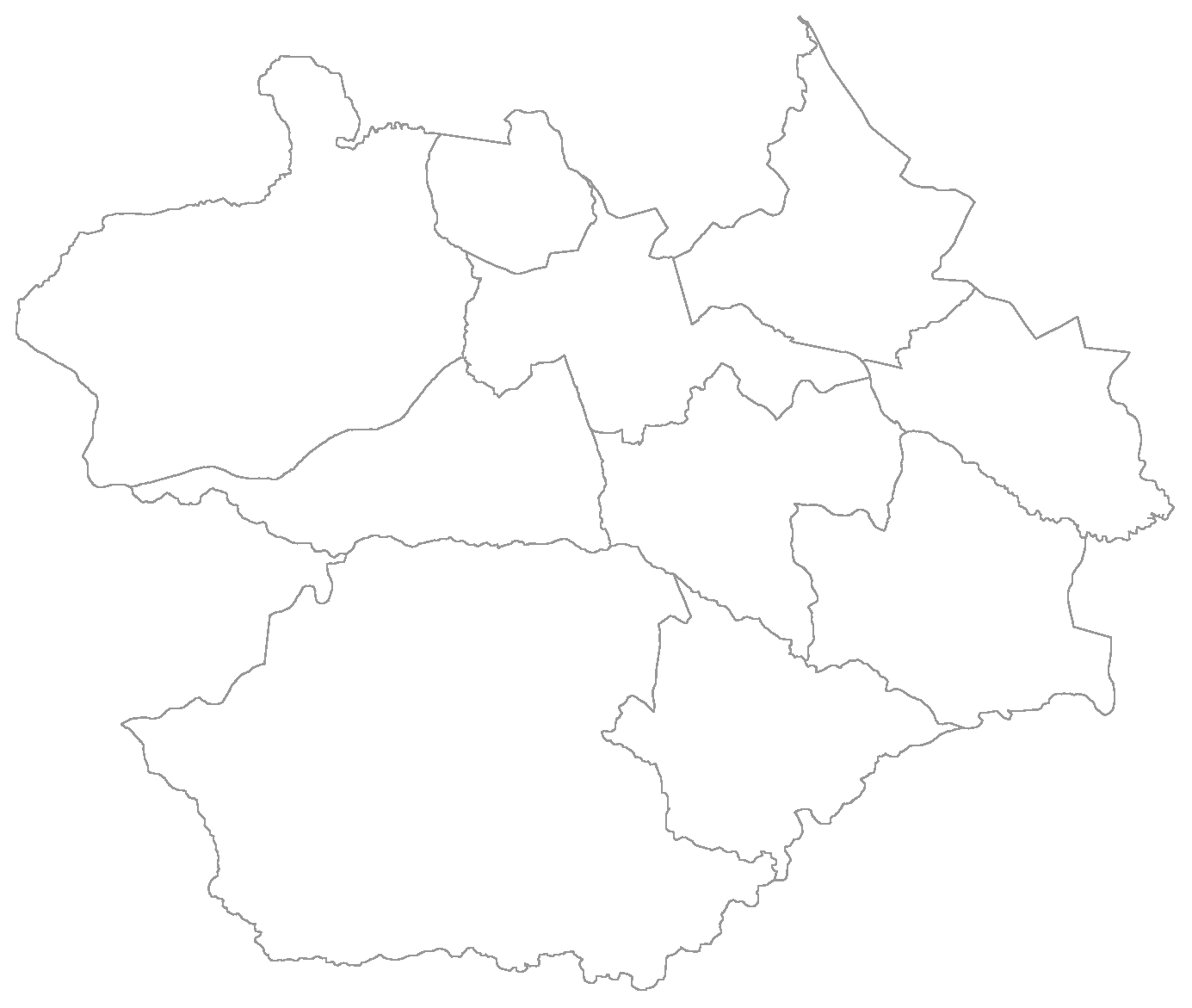
Map of the municipality of Santa Maria, Rio Grande do Sul, Brazil showing the division by districts.

#	District	Distance from Sede	Population (2010)	Date of creation
1st	Sede ("municipal seat")	0 km	246,465 (94.4%)	17 November 1837
2nd	São Valentim	12 km	565 (0.2%)	19 December 1997
3rd	Pains	15 km	4,146 (1.6%)	29 April 1914
4th	Arroio Grande	18 km	2,702 (1.0%)	19 December 1988
5th	Arroio do Só	36 km	944 (0.4%)	4 March 1896
6th	Passo do Verde	23 km	531 (0.2%)	19 April 1991
7th	Boca do Monte	16 km	2,941 (1.1%)	4 March 1896
8th	Palma	18 km	856 (0.3%)	19 December 1997
9th	Santa Flora	36 km	1,074 (0.4%)	27 July 1962
10th	Santo Antão	11 km	807 (0.3%)	28 December 2001
Total Municipal Population			261 031 (100.0%)	

Apart from the 1st District, all the others are administered by Subprefects (subprefeitos), each of them appointed by the municipal Mayor.

== Bairros and Administrative Regions ==
Santa Maria is officially organized in 50 bairros ("neighborhoods"), 41 of which are located in the 1st District of Sede ("Seat"), which accounts for 94.4% of the total population in the municipality. The remaining 9 bairros are coextensive with the 9 rural districts.

The 41 bairros of the Seat District are further grouped into 8 regiões administrativas (or R.A., "administrative regions").

District	Administrative Region	Bairros
Sede	R.A. Center	Centro ("city centre" or "downtown"); Bonfim; Nonoai; Nossa Senhora de Fátima; Nossa Senhora de Lourdes; Nossa Senhora Medianeira; Nossa Senhora do Rosário
Sede	R.A. Center-East	João Luiz Pozzobon; Cerrito; Pé-de-Plátano; São José
Sede	R.A. Center-West	Duque de Caxias; Noal; Passo D'Areia; Patronato; Uglione
Sede	R.A. East	Camobi
Sede	R.A. North	Carolina; Caturrita; Chácara das Flores; Divina Providência; Nossa Senhora do Perpétuo Socorro; Salgado Filho
Sede	R.A. Northeast	Campestre do Menino Deus; Itararé; Km 3; Menino Jesus; Nossa Senhora das Dores; Presidente João Goulart
Sede	R.A. South	Lorenzi; Dom Antônio Reis; Tomazetti; Urlândia
Sede	R.A. West	Agro-Industrial; Boi Morto; Juscelino Kubistchek; Pinheiro Machado; Renascença; Nova Santa Marta; São João; Tancredo Neves
São Valentim	—	São Valentim
Pains	—	Pains
Arroio Grande	—	Arroio Grande
Arroio do Só	—	Arroio do Só
Passo do Verde	—	Passo do Verde
Boca do Monte	—	Boca do Monte
Palma	—	Palma
Santa Flora	—	Santa Flora
Santo Antão	—	Santo Antão
