= Santa Flora, district of Santa Maria =

District of Santa Flora Santa Flora, the 9th district of Santa Maria
- District
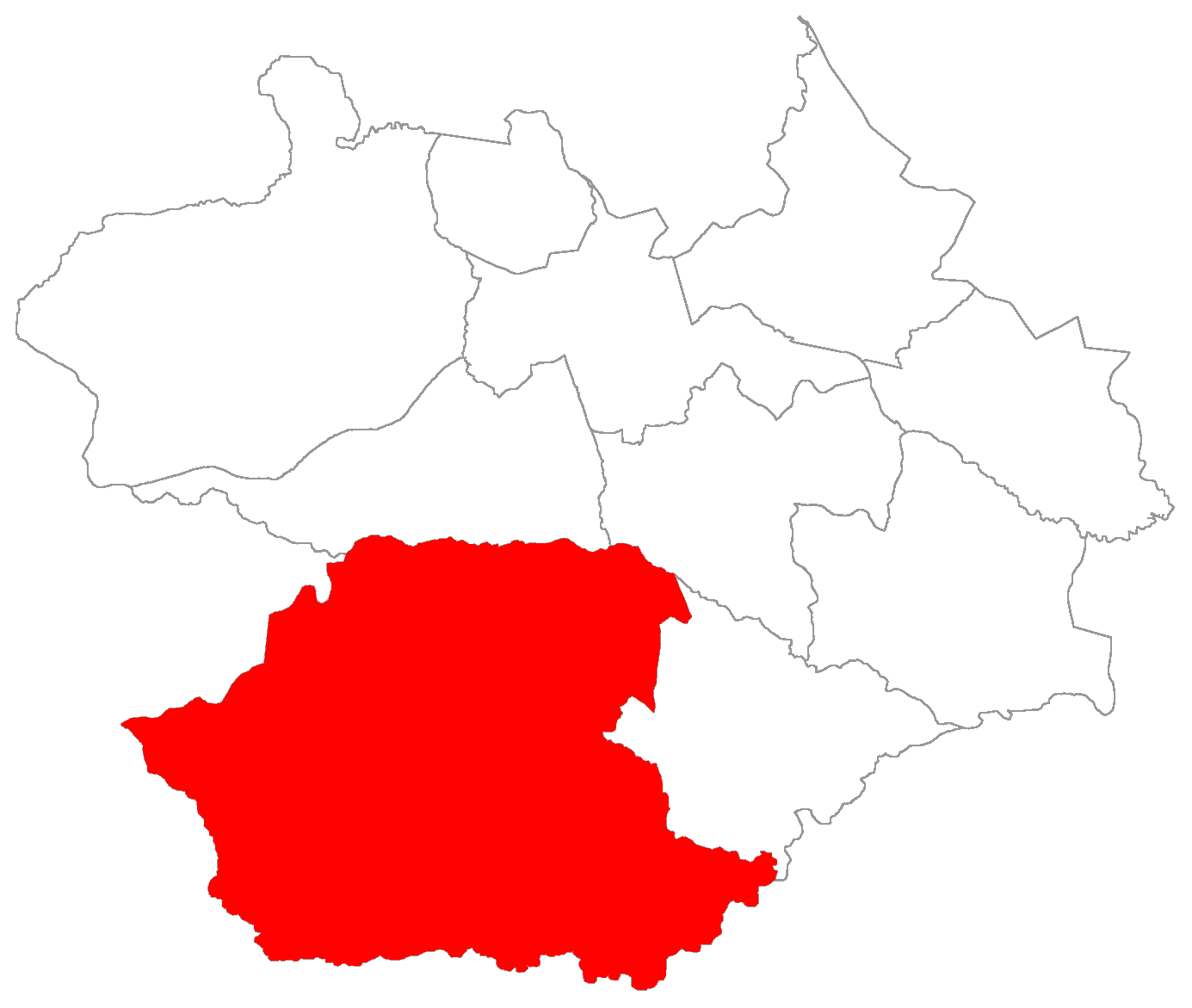
- District of Santa Flora, in Santa Maria City, Rio Grande do Sul, Brazil
- Coordinates: 29°53′47.01″S 53°53′37.45″W
- Country: Brazil
- State: Rio Grande do Sul
- municipality: Santa Maria

Government
  - Type: Subprefecture
  - Body: Subprefect

Area
  - District: 508.52 km^{2} (196.34 sq mi)
- Highest elevation: 139 m (456 ft)
- Lowest elevation: 50 m (160 ft)

Population
  - District: 1,074
  - Rank: 5th of 10
  - Density: 2.112/km^{2} (5.470/sq mi)
  - Urban: 175
  - Rural: 899
- Neighbourhoods: 1
- Adjacent districts: Pains, Passo do Verde, São Valentim.
- Website: Official site of Santa Maria

Santa Flora ("Saint Flora") is a district of the municipality of Santa Maria, in the Brazilian state of Rio Grande do Sul. It is situated in the south portion of Santa Maria. The district's seat is located 36 km (22,37 miles) from Downtown Santa Maria.

The district of Santa Flora owns an area of 508,52 km² that is equivalent to 28,38% of the municipality of Santa Maria that is 1791,65 km².

== History ==
The district of Santa Flora was created in 1961 and its first name was Colônia Vacacaí. Its area arose from the dismemberment of territories from the districts of Arroio do Só and Dilermando de Aguiar, that was a district of Santa Maria and nowadays is a municipality.

On July 7, 1962 the district received the actual name.

== Limits ==
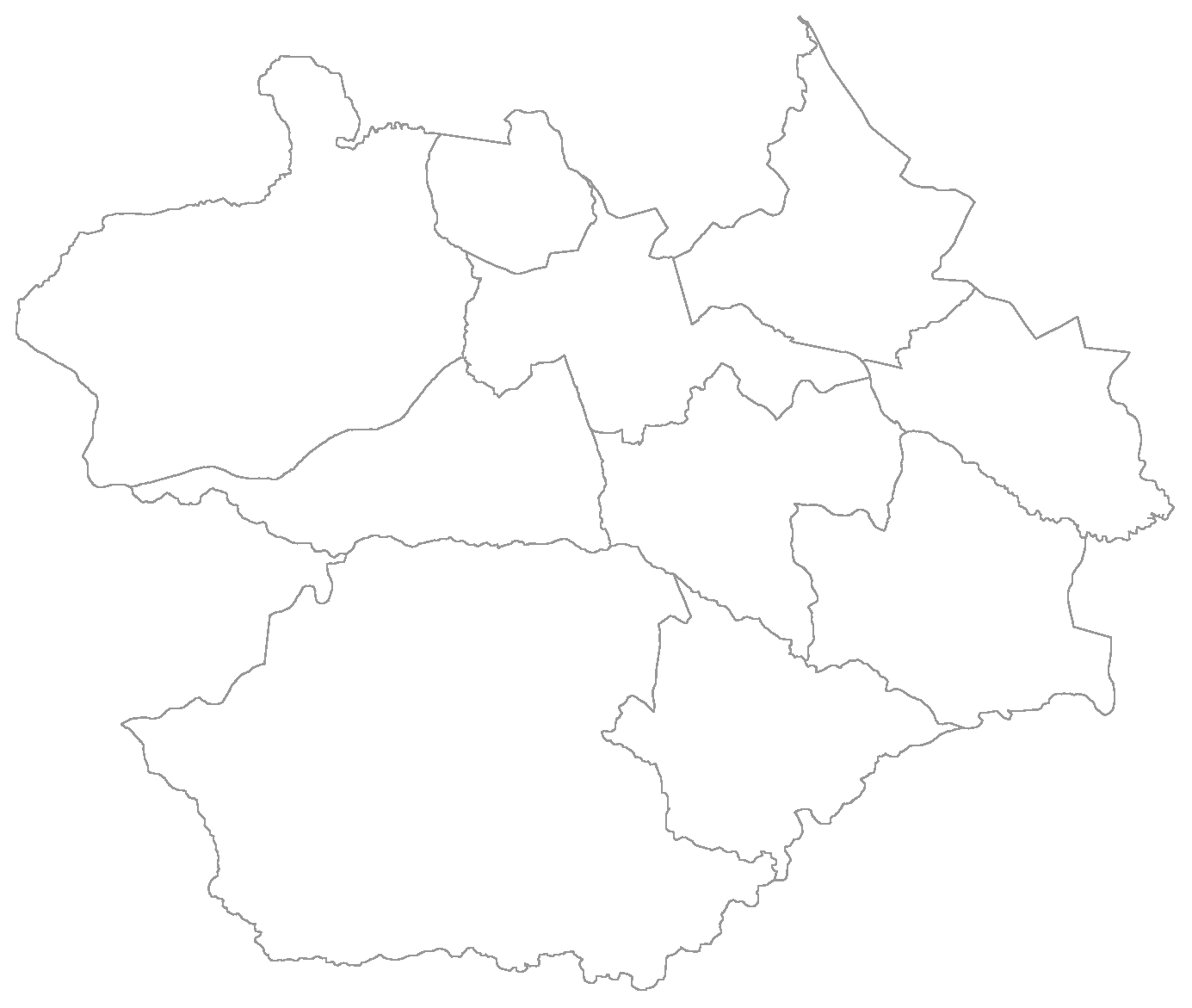
Map of the municipality of Santa Maria, Rio Grande do Sul, Brazil showing the division by districts.

The district limits with the districts of Pains, Passo do Verde, São Valentim, and, with the municipalities of São Sepé, São Gabriel and Dilermando de Aguiar.

== Neighbourhoods ==
The district of Santa Flora is divided in the following bairros, that in English is equivalent to neighbourhoods:

- Santa Flora;

== Roads and railway ==
- In the district there is no railway;
- BR-392: In a small distance in the divide with the district of Passo do Verde;

== See also ==
- District of Santa Flora, in Portuguese Wikipedia.
