= Palma, district of Santa Maria =

District of Palma Palma, the 8th district of Santa Maria
- District
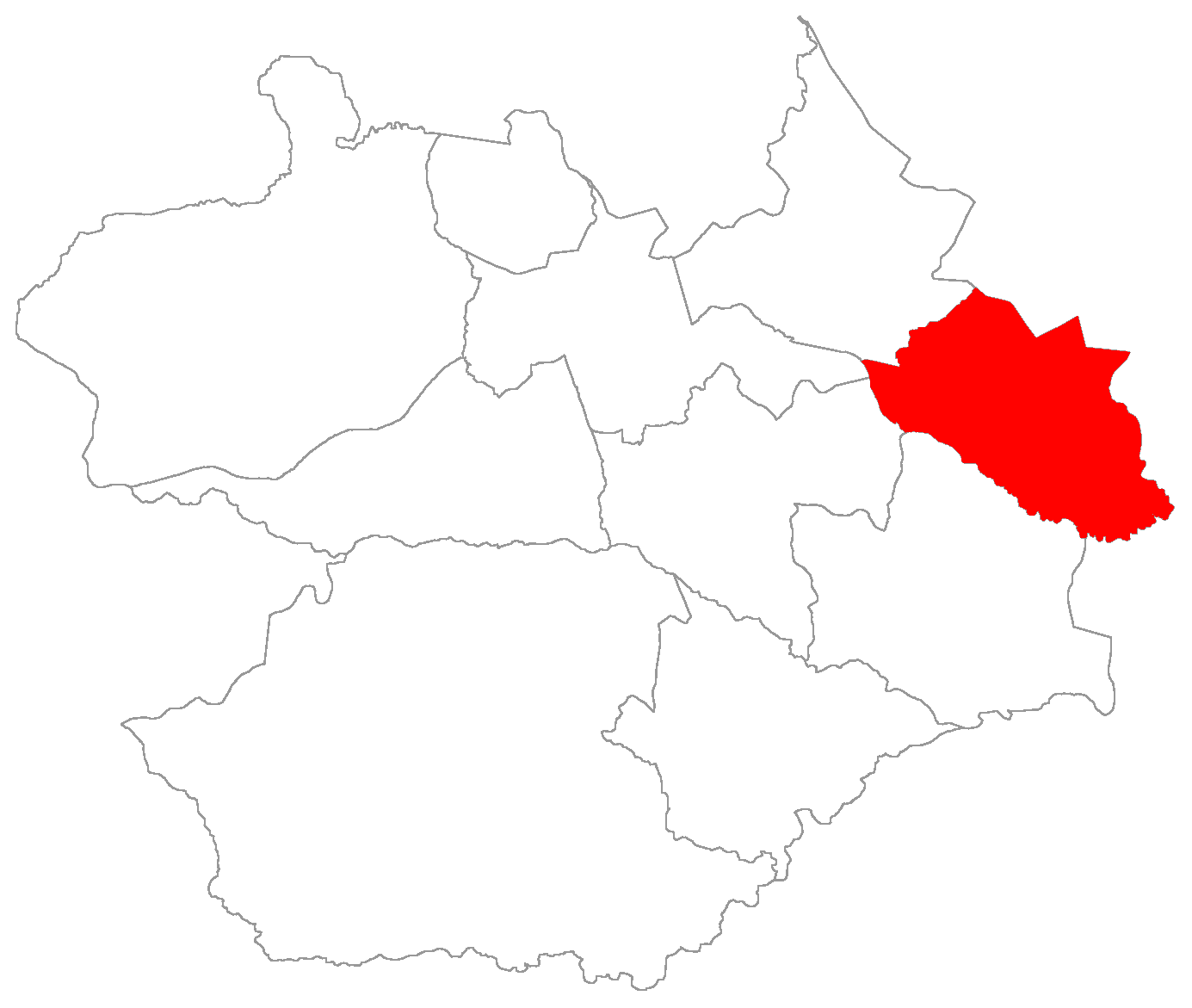
- District of Palma, in Santa Maria City, Rio Grande do Sul, Brazil
- Coordinates: 29°43′53.09″S 53°34′49.04″W
- Country: Brazil
- State: Rio Grande do Sul
- Municipality/City: Santa Maria

Government
  - Type: Subprefecture
  - Body: Subprefect

Area
  - District: 95.18 km^{2} (36.75 sq mi)
- Highest elevation: 478 m (1,568 ft)
- Lowest elevation: 59 m (194 ft)

Population
  - District: 856
  - Rank: 7th of 10
  - Density: 8.99/km^{2} (23.3/sq mi)
  - Urban: 0
  - Rural: 856
- Neighbourhoods: 1
- Adjacent districts: Arroio do Só, Arroio Grande, Pains, Sede
- Website: Palma8SM.com, Palma SM's official website Official site of Santa Maria

Palma ("palm") is a district of the municipality of Santa Maria in the Brazilian state of Rio Grande do Sul. It is situated in north-eastern Santa Maria. The district's seat is located in its geographic center, 23 km (14,59 miles) from Downtown Santa Maria.

The district was created on December 17, 1997.

The district of Palma occupies an area of 95.18 km^{2} that is equivalent to 5.31% of the municipality of Santa Maria that is 1791,65 km^{2}.

== History ==
In 1997, Santa Maria lost areas with the emancipations occurring in the then districts of Itaara and Dilermando de Aguiar.

At that time, Santa Maria was being administrated by Mayor Oswaldo Nascimento of Brazilian Labour Party, who was in his second mandate. It was then that the inhabitants of the current district came together and through a peoples petition with 280 signatures, vindicated the creation of the district.

The peoples main argument was negligence from the City hall of the locality, because the City hall had not furnished the district any type of assistance. The City hall accepted the creation of this district, in that it had separated from the district of Arroio do Só, in a portion east, and from the district of Arroio Grande in a portion west.

The first district's subprefecture worked, temporarily, together to communitarian salon of Our Lady of Good Health, in Faxinal da Palma Village.

== Geography ==
In the district front the main rivers the Arroio Grande River and Vacacaí-Mirim River with the tributaries the Tafona Rivulet and the Araricá Rivulet.

The majority of the population have lived in the district for more than twenty years.

The economy in the district consists mainly of agriculture and livestock.

From the economic viewpoint, the district is divided into two areas:

1. The first formed by the central and southern portion, with a good mixture of agriculture and livestock, having a more suitable topography to develop them.
2. The second area at north, with less agriculture and more diversified businesses because the properties are small and it is situated near the hills making farming less profitable.

== Limits ==
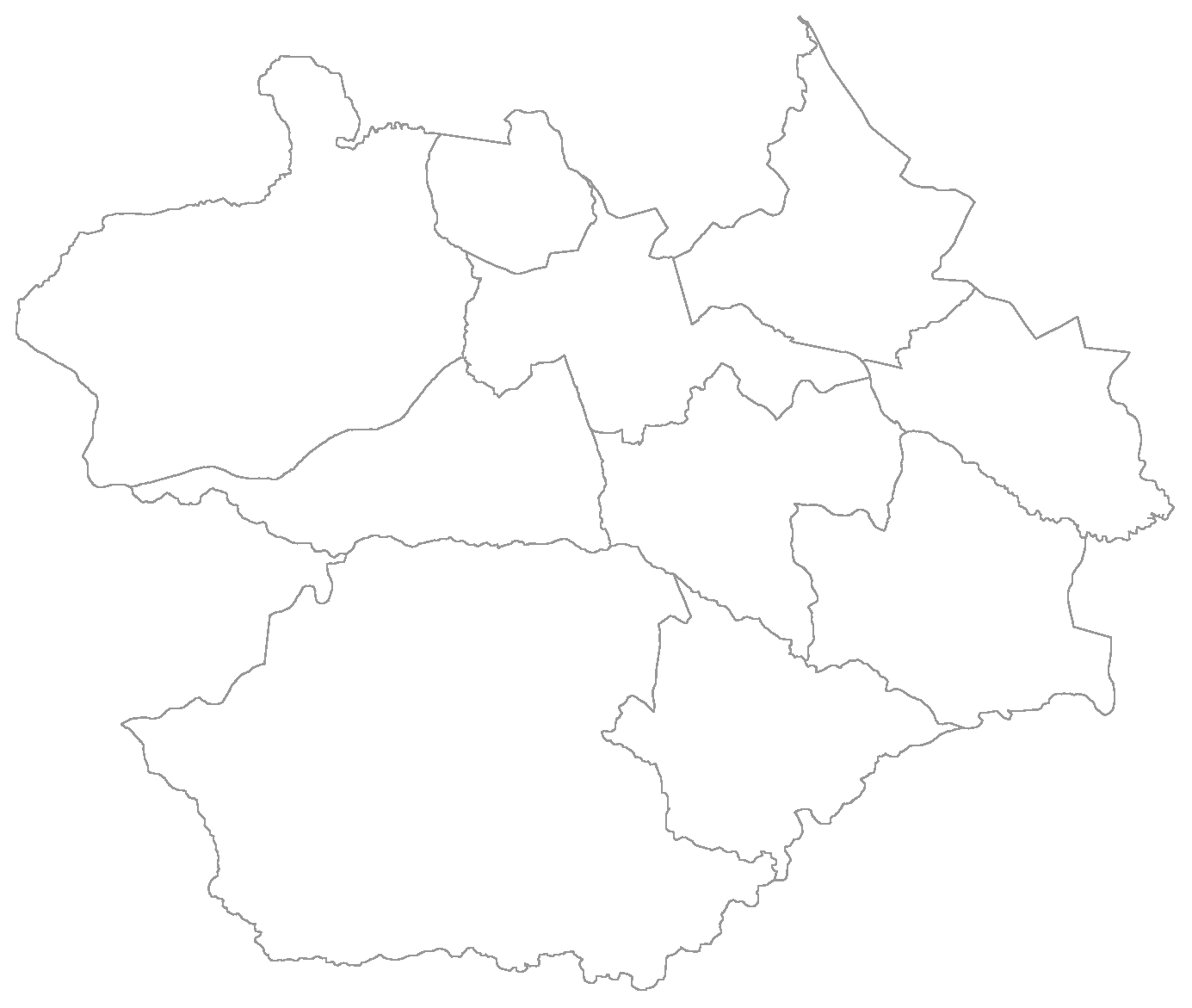
Map of the municipality of Santa Maria, Rio Grande do Sul, Brazil showing the division by districts.

The district limits with the districts of Arroio do Só, Arroio Grande, Pains and Sede, and, with the municipalities of Restinga Seca and Silveira Martins.

== Neighbourhoods ==
The district of Palma is divided in the following bairros, that in English is equivalent to neighbourhoods:

- Palma;

== Roads and railway ==
- Though the district doesn't contain any railway lines, the América Latina Logística railway crosses in the district of Arroio do Só perimetering in two kilometers far from the boundary of Palma with Arroio do Só district.
- The district owns the following highways:
  - RSC-287: Intersects the district in the north and the south. In the district it has 11 km and it is the most important road in the district.
  - RS-804: Or Estrada do Imigrante ("Immigrant road"), is asphalted and is situated in the north-west of the district. It connects Silveira Martins to RSC-287.
- Another important road is Rua do Radar (Radar Street), that connects the lighthouse radar of Santa Maria Air Force Base to RS-804 highway.
