= Passo do Verde, district of Santa Maria =

District of Passo do Verde Passo do Verde, the 6th district of Santa Maria
- District
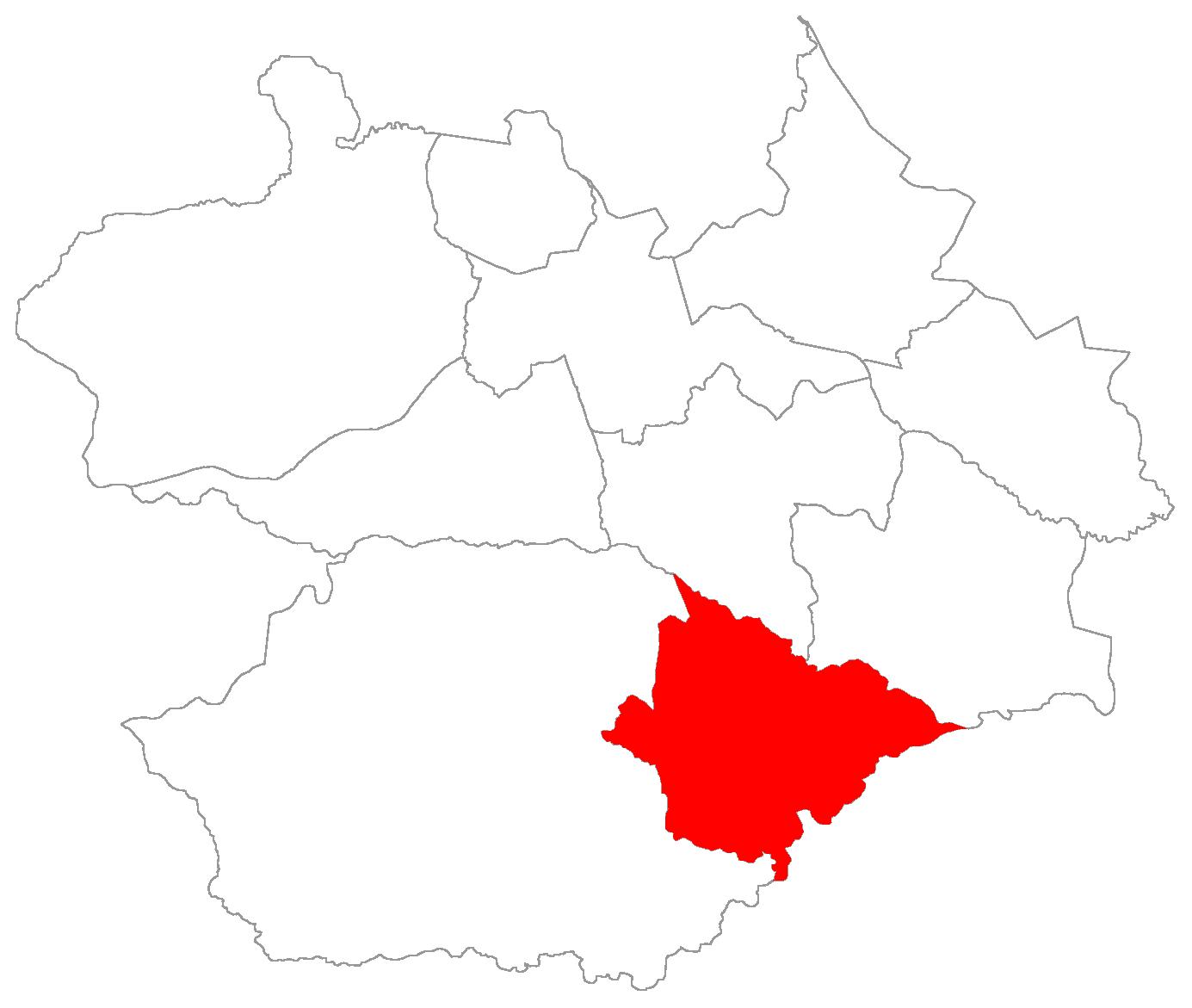
- District of Passo do Verde, in Santa Maria City, Rio Grande do Sul, Brazil
- Coordinates: 29°52′59.77″S 53°43′13.40″W
- Country: Brazil
- State: Rio Grande do Sul
- municipality/City: Santa Maria

Government
  - Type: Subprefecture
  - Body: Subprefect

Area
  - District: 133.40 km^{2} (51.51 sq mi)
- Highest elevation: 116 m (381 ft)
- Lowest elevation: 41 m (135 ft)

Population
  - District: 531
  - Rank: 10th of 10
  - Density: 3.98/km^{2} (10.3/sq mi)
  - Urban: 5
  - Rural: 526
- Neighbourhoods: 1
- Adjacent districts: Arroio do Só, Pains, Santa Flora
- Website: Official site of Santa Maria

Passo do Verde (Portuguese pronunciation: [ˈpasu du ˈveʁdʒi]; "green pitch") is a district of the municipality of Santa Maria, in the Brazilian state of Rio Grande do Sul. It is situated in the south portion of Santa Maria. The district's seat is located 23 km (14,29 miles) from Downtown Santa Maria, nearby the Vacacaí River close to the boundary of Santa Maria with São Sepé.

The district of Passo do Verde owns an area of 133.40 km^{2} that is equivalent to 7.45% of the municipality of Santa Maria that is 1791,65 km^{2}.

== History ==
The district was created on April 19, 1994, by municipal law 3770/94 with area deducted from district of Santa Flora.

== Geography ==
The district is situated in the south portion of municipality of Santa Maria. Altogether the relief is suavely undulating and is characterized by the presence of floodplains and coxilhas without big difference with its altimetric elevations.

== Limits ==
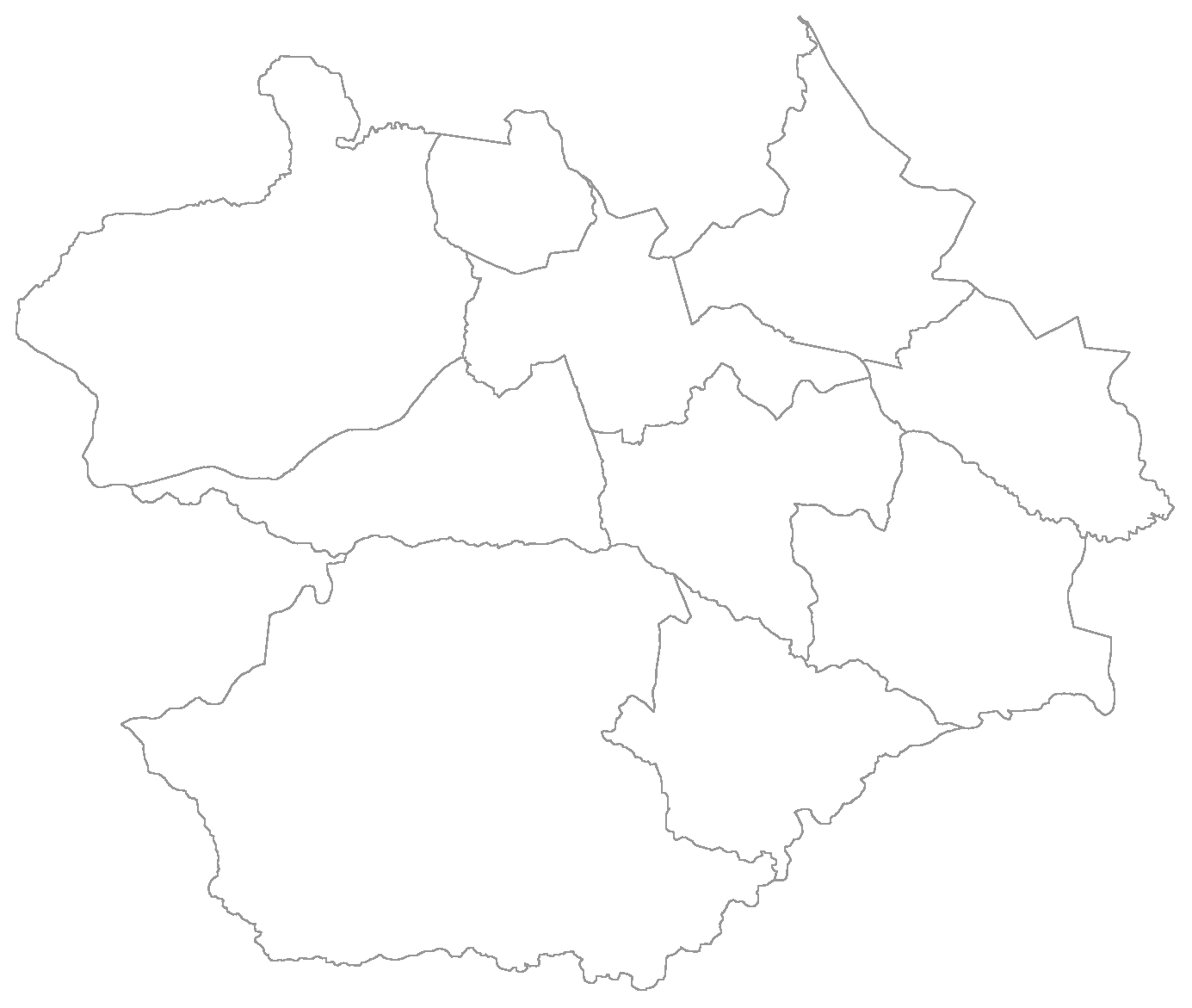
Map of the municipality of Santa Maria, Rio Grande do Sul, Brazil showing the division by districts.

The district limits with the districts of Arroio do Só, Pains and Santa Flora, and, with the municipalities of Formigueiro and São Sepé.

== Neighbourhoods ==
The district of Passo do Verde is divided in the following bairros, that in English is equivalent to neighbourhoods:

- Passo do Verde;

== Roads and railway ==
- In the district there isn't any railway;
- The BR-392 highway crosses the district parting the district in east and west.

== See also ==
- District of Passo do Verde, in Portuguese wikipedia.
