= Pains, district of Santa Maria =

District of Pains Pains, the 3rd district of Santa Maria
- District
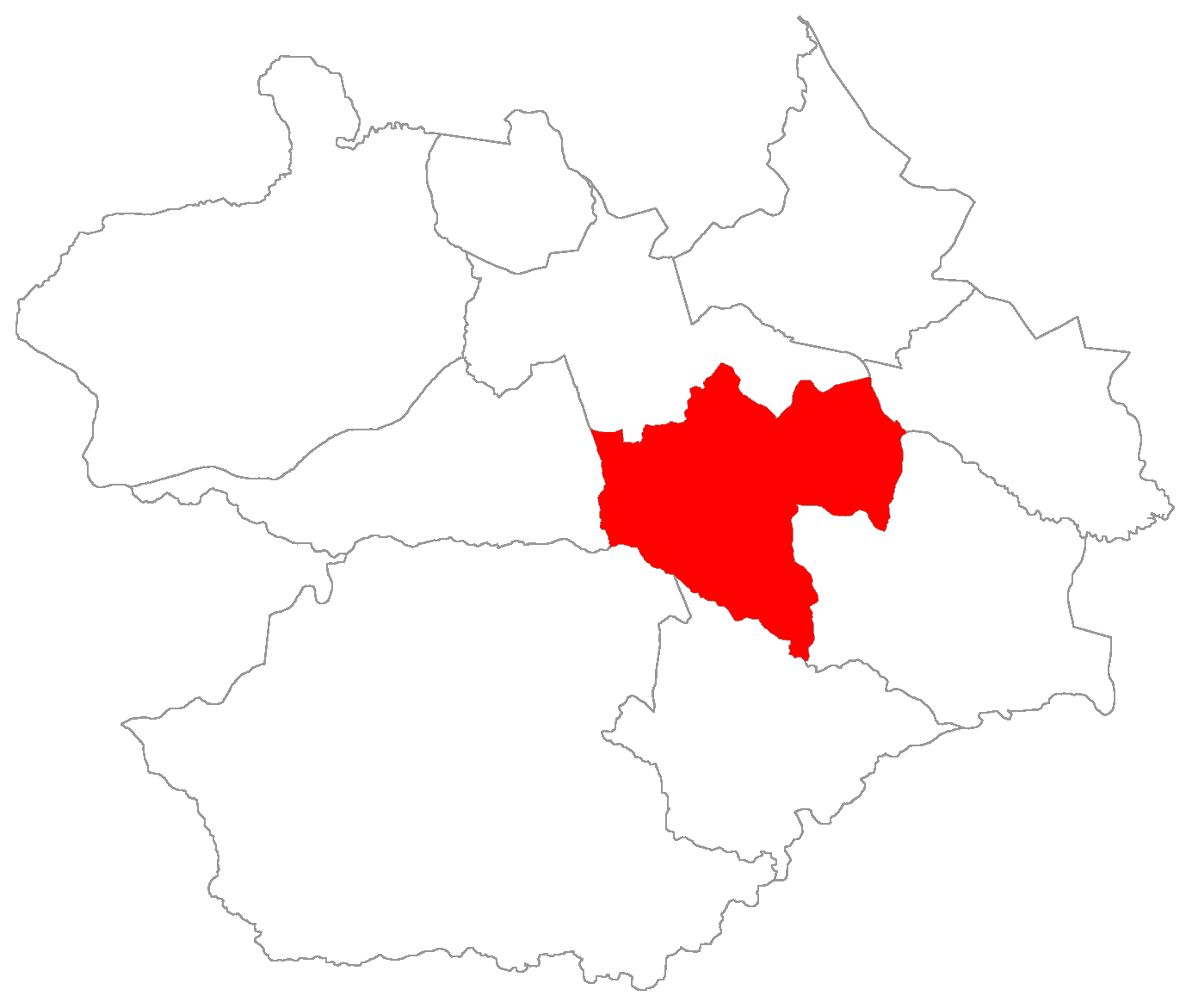
- District of Pains, in Santa Maria City, Rio Grande do Sul, Brazil
- Coordinates: 29°45′05.91″S 53°42′53.48″W
- Country: Brazil
- State: Rio Grande do Sul
- Municipality/City: Santa Maria

Government
  - Type: Subprefecture
  - Body: Subprefect

Area
  - District: 133.61 km^{2} (51.59 sq mi)
- Highest elevation: 139 m (456 ft)
- Lowest elevation: 46 m (151 ft)

Population
  - District: 4,146
  - Rank: 2nd of 10
  - Density: 31.03/km^{2} (80.37/sq mi)
  - Urban: 34
  - Rural: 4,112
- Neighbourhoods: 1
- Adjacent districts: Arroio do Só, Palma, Passo do Verde, Santa Flora, São Valentim, Sede
- Website: Official site of Santa Maria

Pains (Portuguese pronunciation: [???], "Pains" - probably the plural of Paim family name) is a district of the municipality of Santa Maria, in the Brazilian state of Rio Grande do Sul. It is situated in the central portion of Santa Maria. The district's seat is 15 km (9.32 miles) far from Downtown Santa Maria.

The district of Pains owns an area of 133.61 km² that is equivalent to 7,46% of the municipality of Santa Maria that is 1791,65 km².

== History ==
With the creation of the Camobi neighbourhood, integrating it to district of Sede, continued to exist the "district of Camobi" that, nowadays, is equivalent to the districts of Arroio Grande (part of) and Pains. After it was created the district of Arroio Grande and to not be confounded with the neighbourhood of district of Sede with the same name (Camobi), the city hall created the district of Pains.

== Limits ==
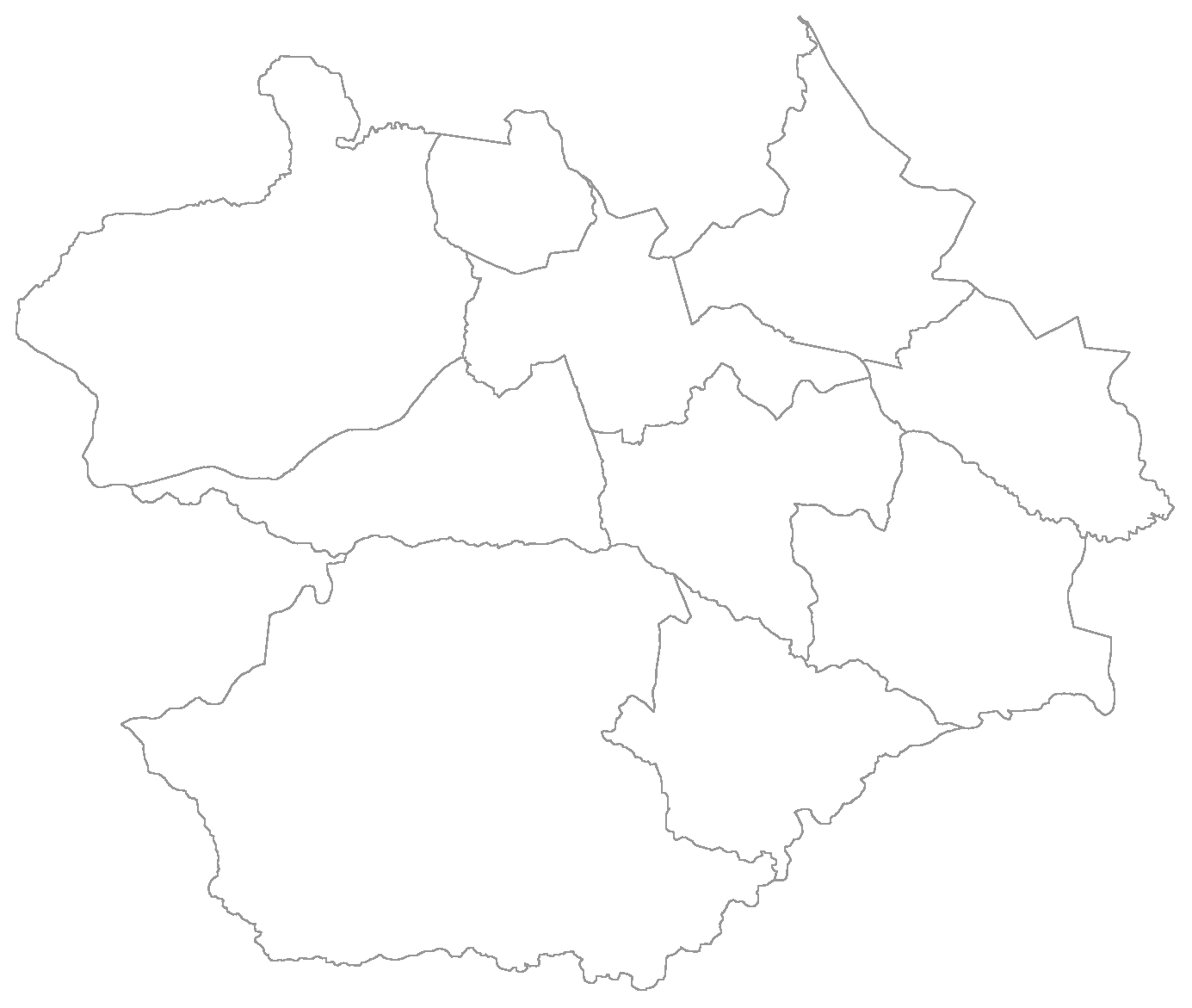
Map of the municipality of Santa Maria, Rio Grande do Sul, Brazil showing the division by districts.

The district limits with the districts of Arroio do Só, Palma, Passo do Verde, Santa Flora, São Valentim and Sede.

== Neighbourhoods ==
The district of Pains is divided in the following bairros, that in English is equivalent to neighbourhoods:

- Pains;

== Roads and railway ==
- The railway crosses the district in the São Sebastião Village, in neighbourhood Pains;
- In the district crosses the following highways:
  - RSC-287: In the boundary with the district of Arroio Grande. Highway that connects to Porto Alegre;
  - BR-392: Crosses in west portion of the district, in the Passo das Tropas Village, in neighbourhood Pains. The highway connects to São Sepé;
