= Boca do Monte, district of Santa Maria =

District of Boca do Monte Boca do Monte, the 7th district of Santa Maria
- District
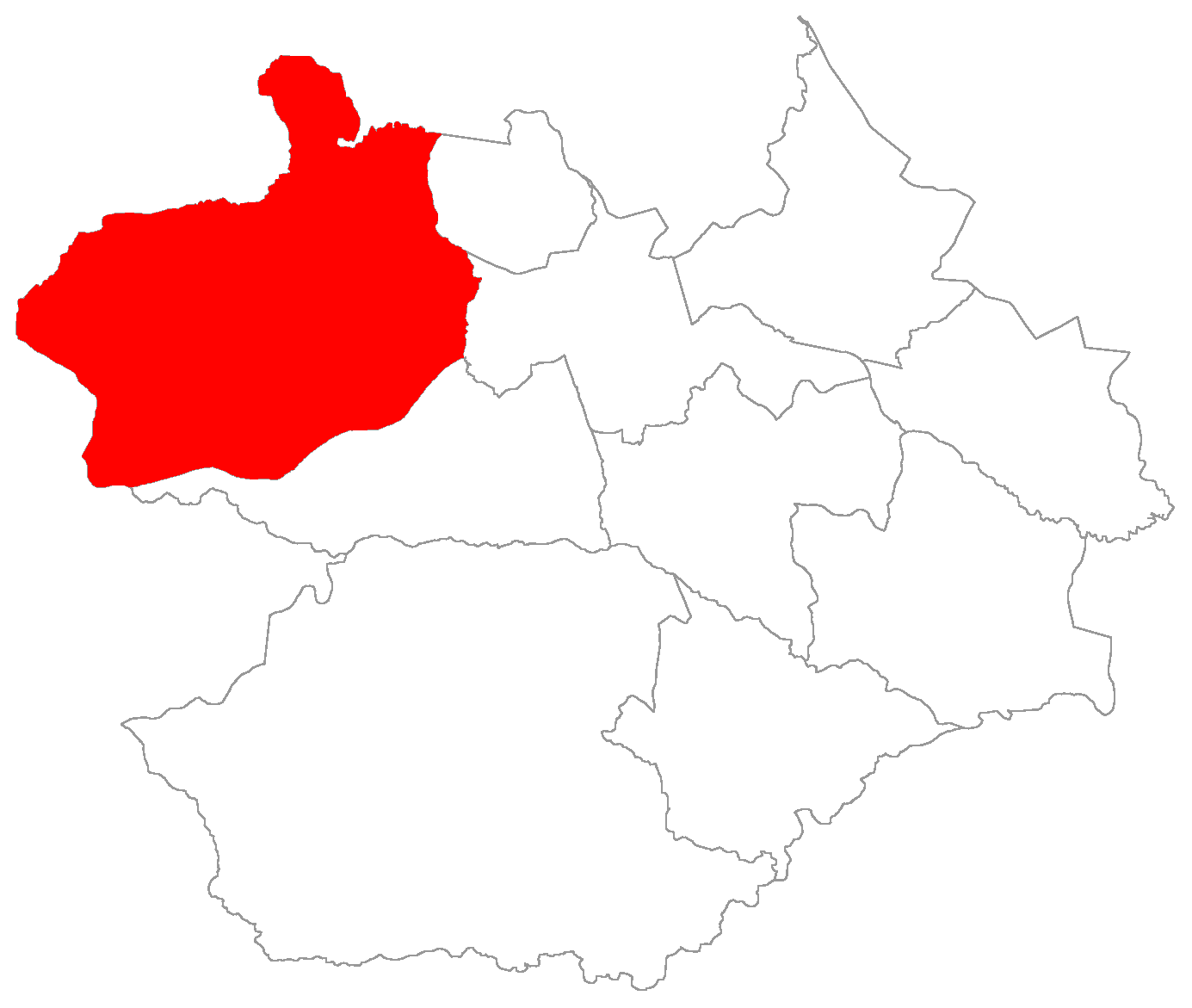
- District of Boca do Monte, in Santa Maria City, Rio Grande do Sul, Brazil
- Coordinates: 29°40′19.57″S 54°00′21.04″W
- Country: Brazil
- State: Rio Grande do Sul
- Municipality/City: Santa Maria

Government
  - Type: Subprefecture
  - Body: Subprefect

Area
  - District: 307.44 km^{2} (118.70 sq mi)
- Highest elevation: 450 m (1,480 ft)
- Lowest elevation: 80 m (260 ft)

Population
  - District: 2,941
  - Rank: 3rd of 10
  - Density: 9.566/km^{2} (24.78/sq mi)
  - Urban: 1,021
  - Rural: 1,920
- Neighbourhoods: 1
- Adjacent districts: Santo Antão, São Valentim, Sede.
- Website: Official site of Santa Maria

Boca do Monte ("Mouth of the Hill") is a district of the municipality of Santa Maria, in the Brazilian state of Rio Grande do Sul. It is situated in the northwest portion of Santa Maria. The district's seat is located 16 km (9.94 miles) from Downtown Santa Maria.

The district of Boca do Monte owns an area of 307.44 km² that is equivalent to 17.16% of the municipality of Santa Maria that is 1791.65 km².

== History ==
The district is, with the districts of Sede and Arroio do Só, the most ancient districts of the municipality of Santa Maria.

== Limits ==
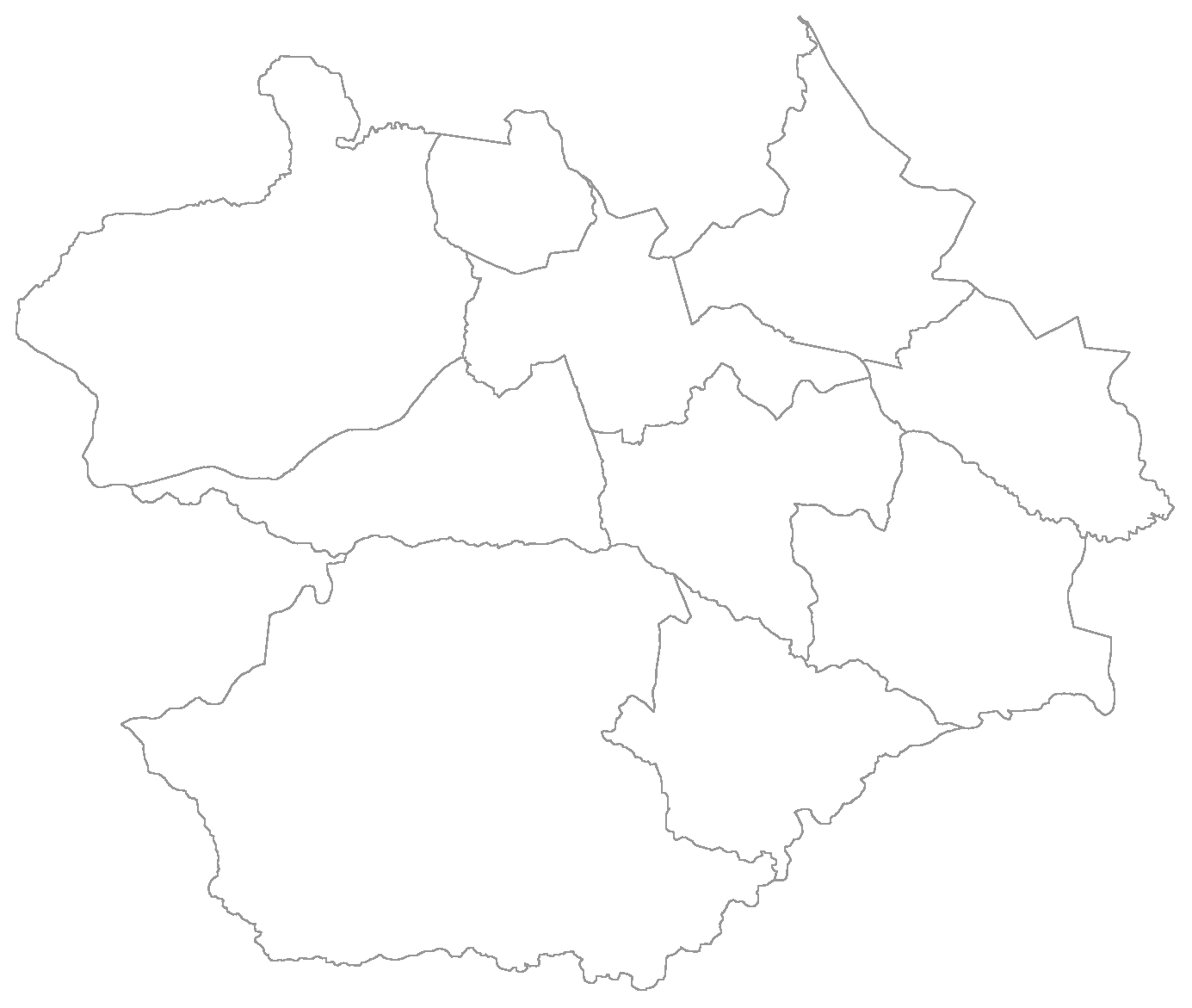
Map of the municipality of Santa Maria, Rio Grande do Sul, Brazil showing the division by districts.

The district limits with the districts of Santo Antão, São Valentim and Sede, and with the municipalities of São Martinho da Serra, São Pedro do Sul e Dilermando de Aguiar.

== Neighbourhoods ==
The district of Boca do Monte is divided in the following bairros, that in English is equivalent to neighbourhoods:

- Boca do Monte;

== Roads and railway ==
- In the district crosses the América Latina Logística railway cutting the portion north of the district.
- In the district crosses the following highways:
  - BR-287: Crosses the district separating it in north and south. The roadway is the exit of Santa Maria to the municipalities of Mata, Santiago e São Borja.
  - BR-158: In the boundary with the district of São Valentim
  - RS-580: Covered with asphalt, connects the district's seat to BR-287 highway.

== See also ==
- District of Boca do Monte, in Portuguese wikipedia.
