= São Valentim, district of Santa Maria =

District of São Valentim São Valentim, the 2nd district of Santa Maria
- District
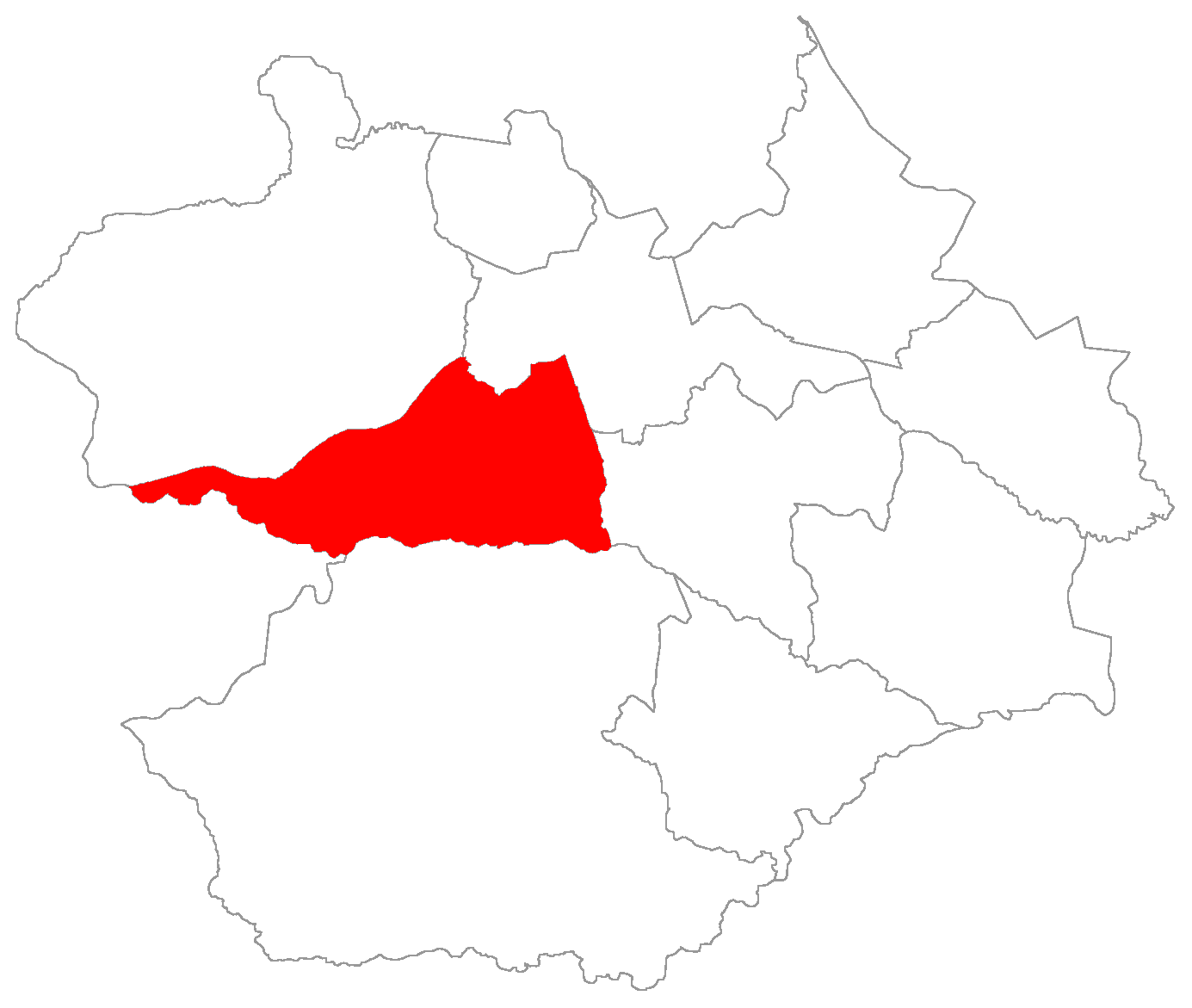
- District of São Valentim, in Santa Maria City, Rio Grande do Sul, Brazil
- Coordinates: 29°45′19.22″S 53°56′59.52″W
- Country: Brazil
- State: Rio Grande do Sul
- municipality/City: Santa Maria

Government
  - Type: Subprefecture
  - Body: Subprefect

Area
  - District: 133.38 km^{2} (51.50 sq mi)
- Highest elevation: 150 m (490 ft)
- Lowest elevation: 60 m (200 ft)

Population
  - District: 565
  - Rank: 9th of 10
  - Density: 4.24/km^{2} (11.0/sq mi)
  - Urban: 14
  - Rural: 551
- Neighbourhoods: 1
- Adjacent districts: Boca do Monte, Pains, Santa Flora, Sede
- Website: Official site of Santa Maria

São Valentim ("Saint Valentine") is a district of the municipality of Santa Maria, in the Brazilian state of Rio Grande do Sul. It is situated in the west portion of Santa Maria. The district's seat is 12 km (7.46 miles) far from Downtown Santa Maria.

The district of São Valentim owns an area of 133.38 km^{2} that is equivalent to 7.44% of the municipality of Santa Maria that is 1791,65 km^{2}.

== History ==
São Valentim was born in 1997 by the separation from district of Boca do Monte due to geographic factors and inhabitants' will.

== Limits ==
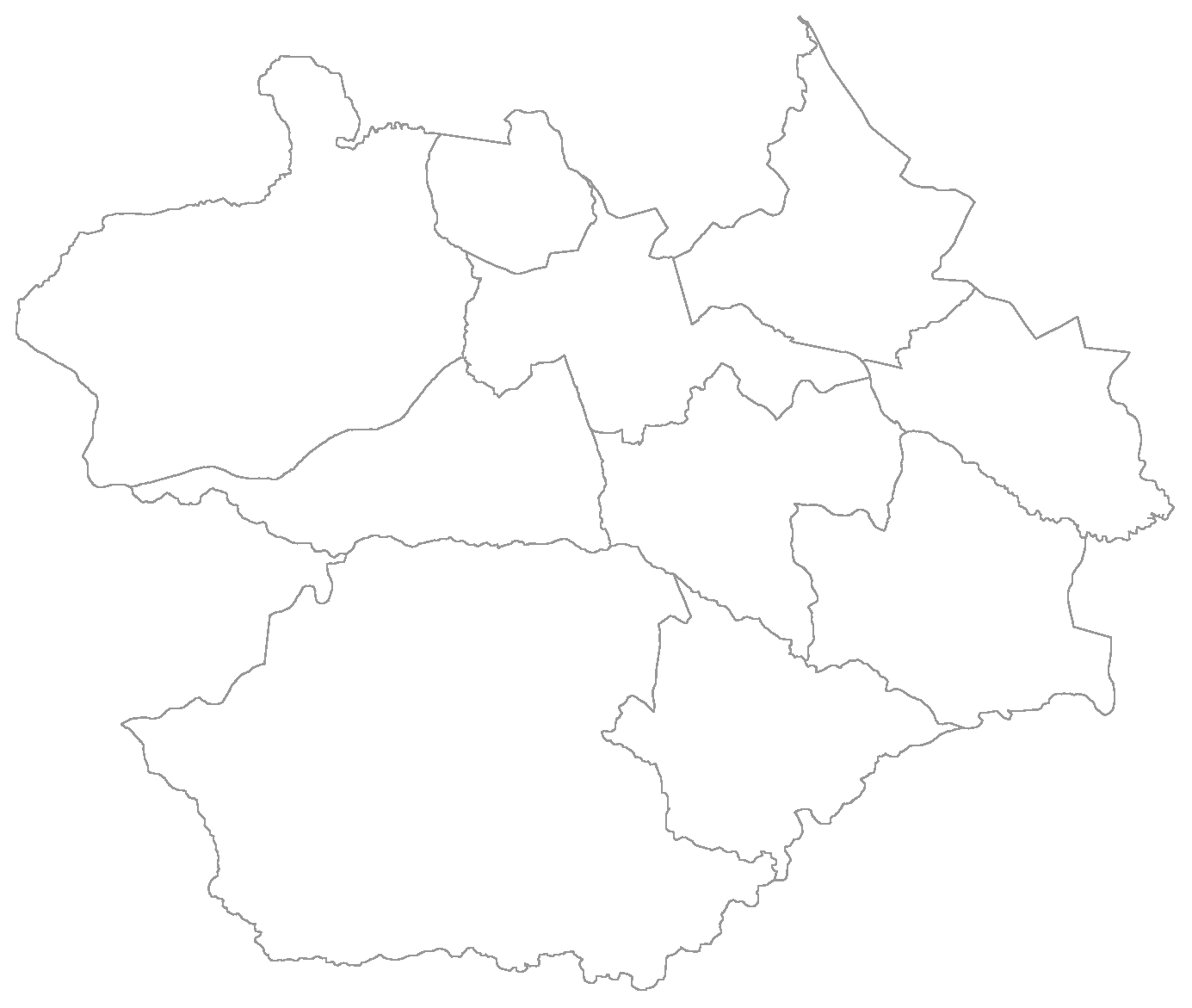
Map of the municipality of Santa Maria, Rio Grande do Sul, Brazil showing the division by districts.

The district limits with the districts of Boca do Monte, Pains, Santa Flora and Sede, and with the municipality of Dilermando de Aguiar.

== Neighbourhoods ==
The district of São Valentim is divided in the following bairros, that in English is equivalent to neighbourhoods:

- São Valentim;

== Roads and railway ==
- In the district hasn't railway;
- The district has the following highways:
  - BR-158: in the northwest portion of district, cutting the district in a stretch and in the boundary with the district of Boca do Monte.
