= Arroio do Só =

- Bairro
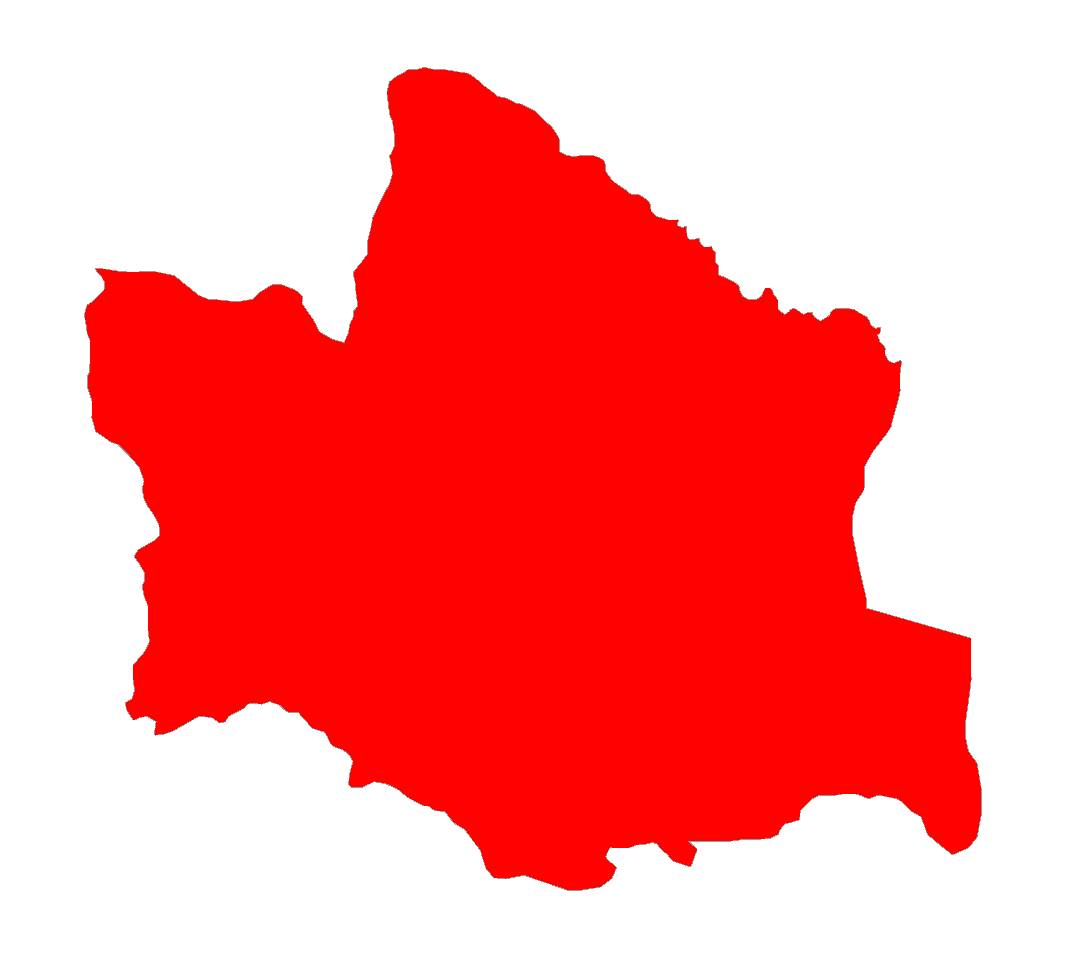
- The bairro in District of Arroio do Só

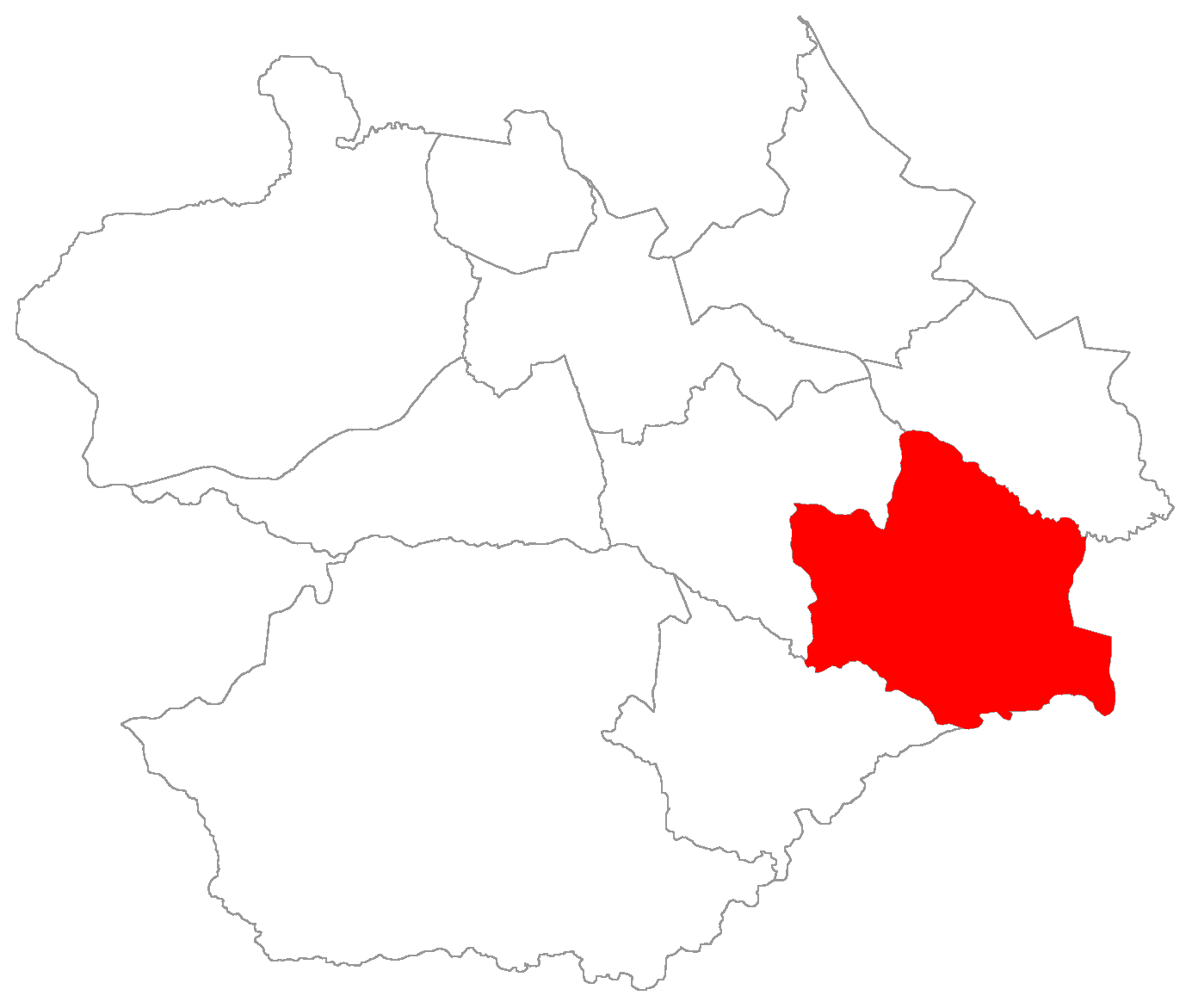
- District of Arroio do Só, in Santa Maria City, Rio Grande do Sul, Brazil
- Coordinates: 29°47′31.61″S 53°33′58.78″W
- Country: Brazil
- State: Rio Grande do Sul
- Municipality/City: Santa Maria
- District: District of Arroio do Só

Area
  - Total: 159.30 km^{2} (61.51 sq mi)

Population
  - Total: 944
  - Density: 5.93/km^{2} (15.3/sq mi)
- Postal code: 97.165-000
- Adjacent bairros: Palma, Pains, Passo do Verde.
- Website: Official site of Santa Maria

Arroio do Só ("rivulet of the hermit") is a bairro in the District of Arroio do Só in the municipality of Santa Maria, in the Brazilian state of Rio Grande do Sul. It is located in east Santa Maria.

== Villages ==
The bairro contains the following villages: Água Boa, Alto dos Mários, Arroio do Só, Coitado, Parada João Alberti, Picada do Arenal, Rincão dos Becos, Rincão dos Pires, Rincão Nossa Senhora Aparecida, São Geraldo, Tronqueiras, Vila Arroio do Só and Vila Silva.
