= Arroio Grande, district of Santa Maria =

District of Arroio Grande Arroio Grande, the 4th district of Santa Maria
- District
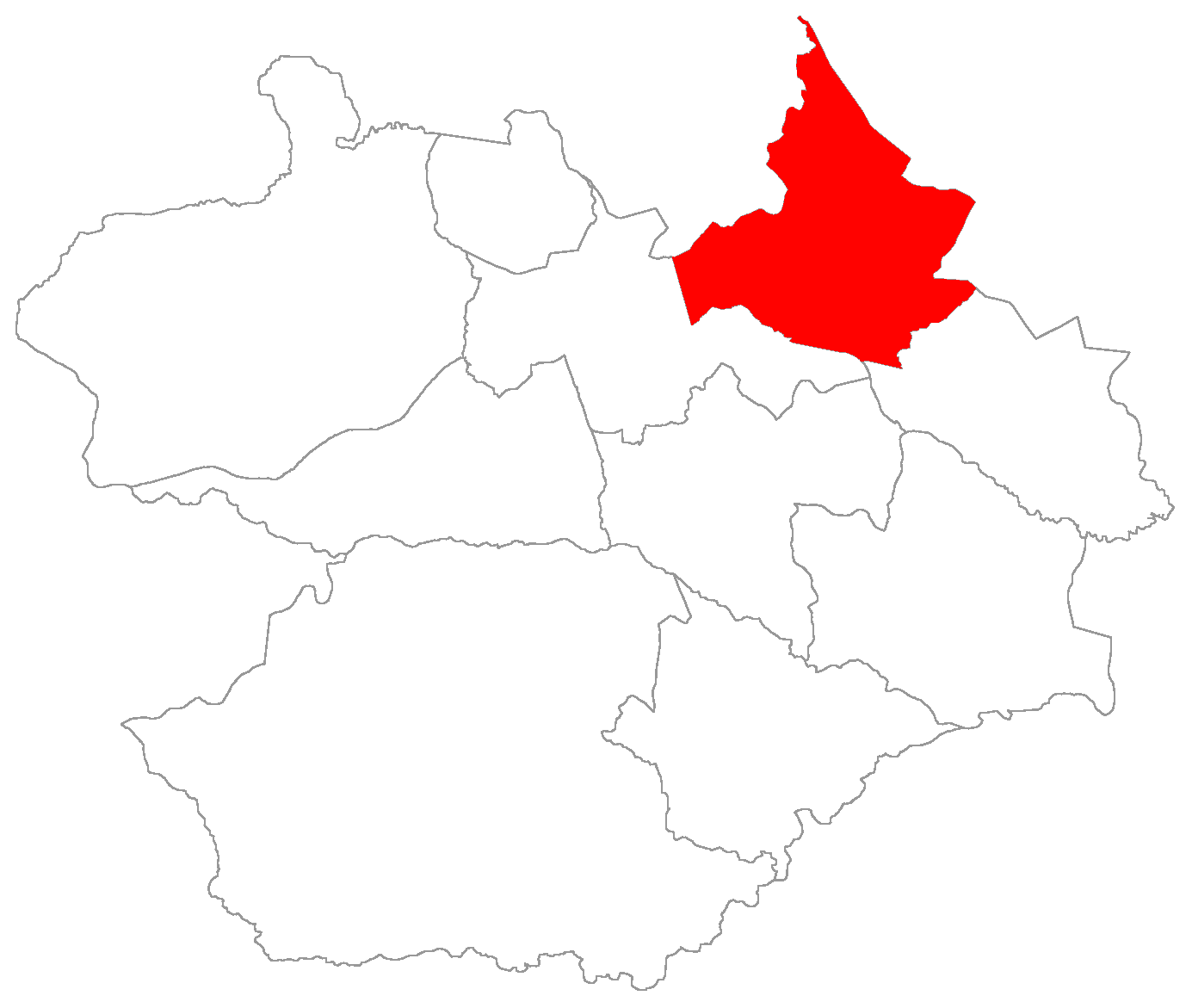
- District of Arroio Grande, in Santa Maria City, Rio Grande do Sul, Brazil
- Coordinates: 29°38′39.48″S 53°40′35.85″W
- Country: Brazil
- State: Rio Grande do Sul
- Municipality/City: Santa Maria

Government
  - Type: Subprefecture
  - Body: Subprefect

Area
  - District: 130.76 km^{2} (50.49 sq mi)
- Highest elevation: 485 m (1,591 ft)
- Lowest elevation: 69 m (226 ft)

Population
  - District: 2,702
  - Rank: 4th of 10
  - Density: 20.66/km^{2} (53.52/sq mi)
  - Urban: 328
  - Rural: 2,374
- Neighbourhoods: 1
- Adjacent districts: Palma, Sede.
- Website: Official site of Santa Maria

Arroio Grande ("big rivulet") is a district of the municipality of Santa Maria, in the Brazilian state of Rio Grande do Sul. It is situated in the north portion of Santa Maria. The district's seat is located 18 km (11,18 miles) from Downtown Santa Maria. The district is known as the portal to a wave of Italian immigration in the late 1870s.

The district of Arroio Grande owns an area of 130.71 km² that is equivalent to 7.30% of the municipality of Santa Maria that is 1791.65 km².

== History ==
The district was created in 1988 by municipal law 3099/88 of 1988.

== Limits ==
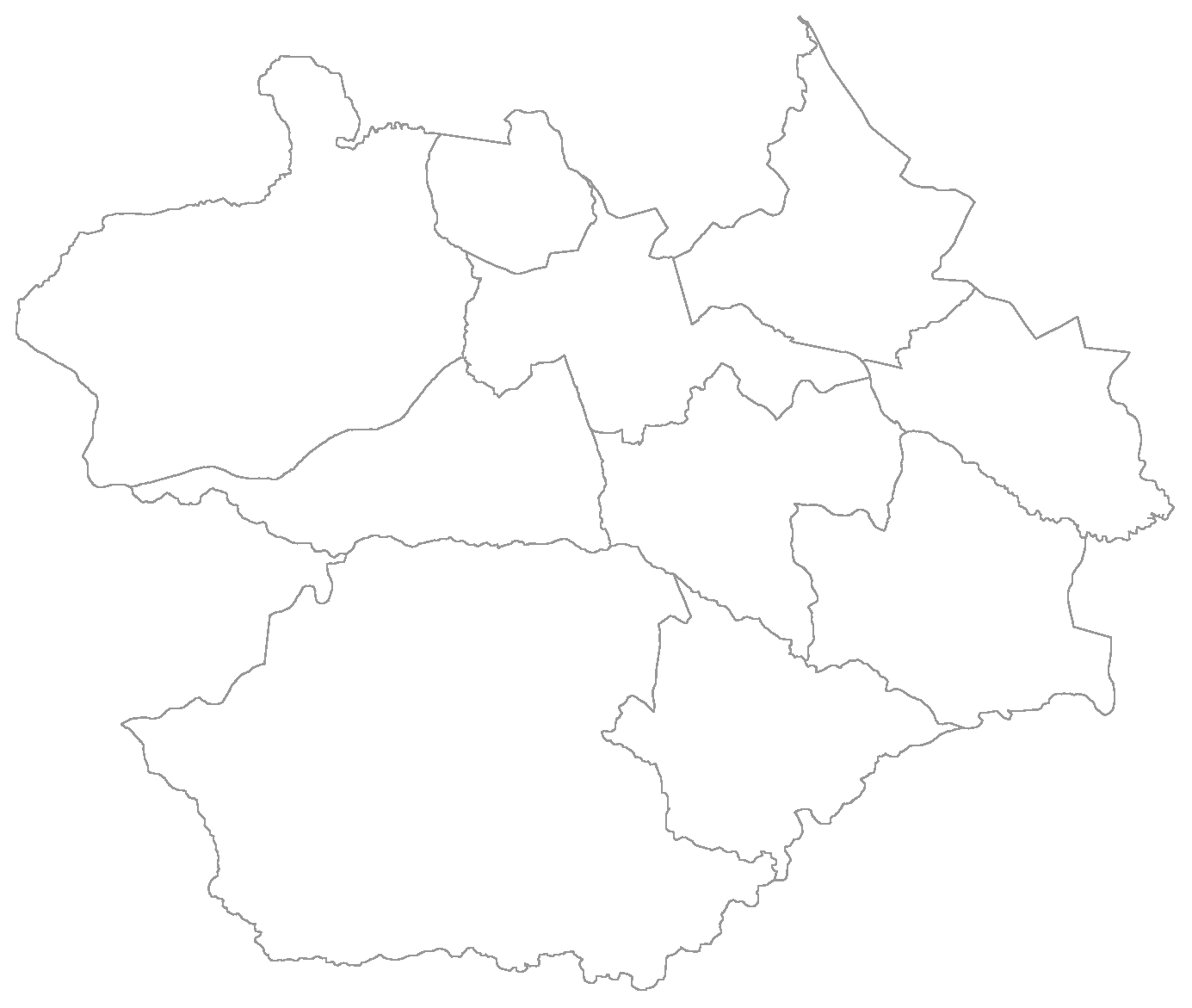
Map of the municipality of Santa Maria, Rio Grande do Sul, Brazil showing the division by districts.

The district limits with the districts of Palma and Sede, and with the municipalities of Silveira Martins, Júlio de Castilhos and Itaára.

== Neighbourhoods ==
The district of Arroio Grande is divided in the following bairros, that in English is equivalent to neighbourhoods:

- Arroio Grande;

== Roads and railway ==
- The América Latina Logística railway crosses by the south of the district, in the district of Sede and by a small part of the boundary of the two districts.
- Highways in the district:
  - RSC-287: In the south perimeter of the district.
  - RS-511: Also known by "Estrada Municipal Norberto José Kipper" and is the main highway in the district.

== See also ==
- District of Arroio Grande, in Portuguese Wikipedia.
