= Nonoai, Porto Alegre =

Neighborhood in Porto Alegre, Brazil

- Country: Brazil
- City: Porto Alegre
- State: Rio Grande do Sul

Nonoai is a neighbourhood (bairro) in the city of Porto Alegre, the state capital of Rio Grande do Sul, in Brazil. It was created by Law 2022 on December 7, 1959.

== Famous residents ==
- Iberê Camargo, painter
