= Arroio do Só, district of Santa Maria =

District of Arroio do Só Arroio do Só, the 5th district of Santa Maria
- District
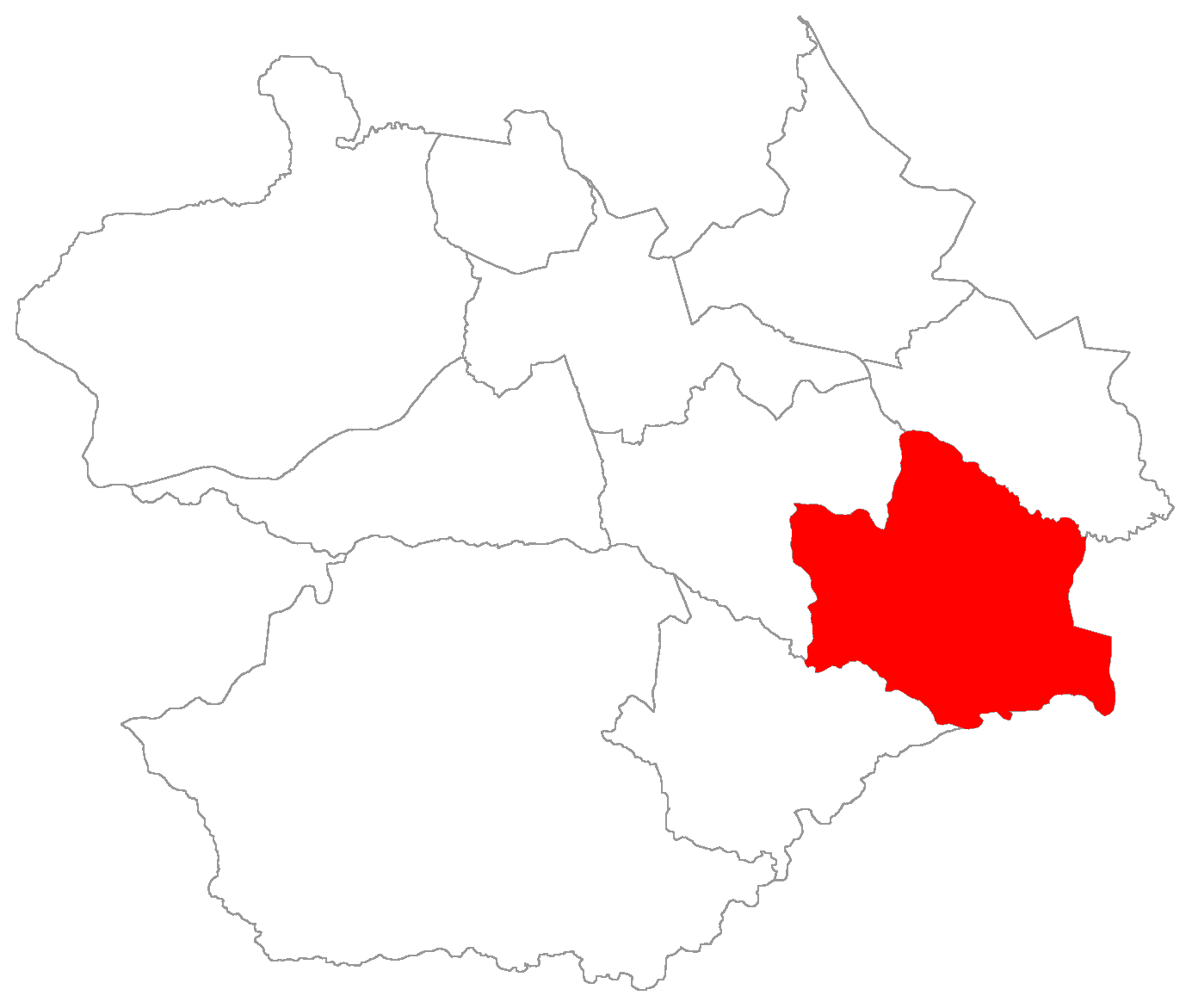
- District of Arroio do Só, in Santa Maria City, Rio Grande do Sul, Brazil
- Coordinates: 29°49′02.73″S 53°37′37.87″W
- Country: Brazil
- State: Rio Grande do Sul
- Municipality/City: Santa Maria

Government
  - Type: Subprefecture
  - Body: Subprefect

Area
  - District: 159.30 km^{2} (61.51 sq mi)
- Highest elevation: 150 m (490 ft)
- Lowest elevation: 41 m (135 ft)

Population
  - District: 944
  - Rank: 6th of 10
  - Density: 5.93/km^{2} (15.3/sq mi)
  - Urban: 289
  - Rural: 655
- Neighbourhoods: 1
- Adjacent districts: Pains, Palma, Passo do Verde.
- Website: Official site of Santa Maria

Arroio do Só ("rivulet of the hermit") is a district of the municipality of Santa Maria, in the Brazilian state of Rio Grande do Sul. It is situated in the east portion of Santa Maria. The district's seat is located 36 km (22,37 miles) from Downtown Santa Maria, and, is situated closely to limit with the district of Palma and limits with the municipality of Restinga Seca.

The district of Arroio do Só owns an area of 159,30 km² that is equivalent to 8,89% of the municipality of Santa Maria that is 1791,65 km².

== History ==
The district was created in 1886, in 1993 the district's name was changed to "Arroio do Sol" (Rivulet of the Sun), and, in 1998 its name came back to be Arroio do Só (Rivulet of the Hermit).

In 1950, Arroio do Só owned 460 km². In 1961 loses part of its territory to the district of Santa Flora and, in 1997, to district of Palma.

== Limits ==
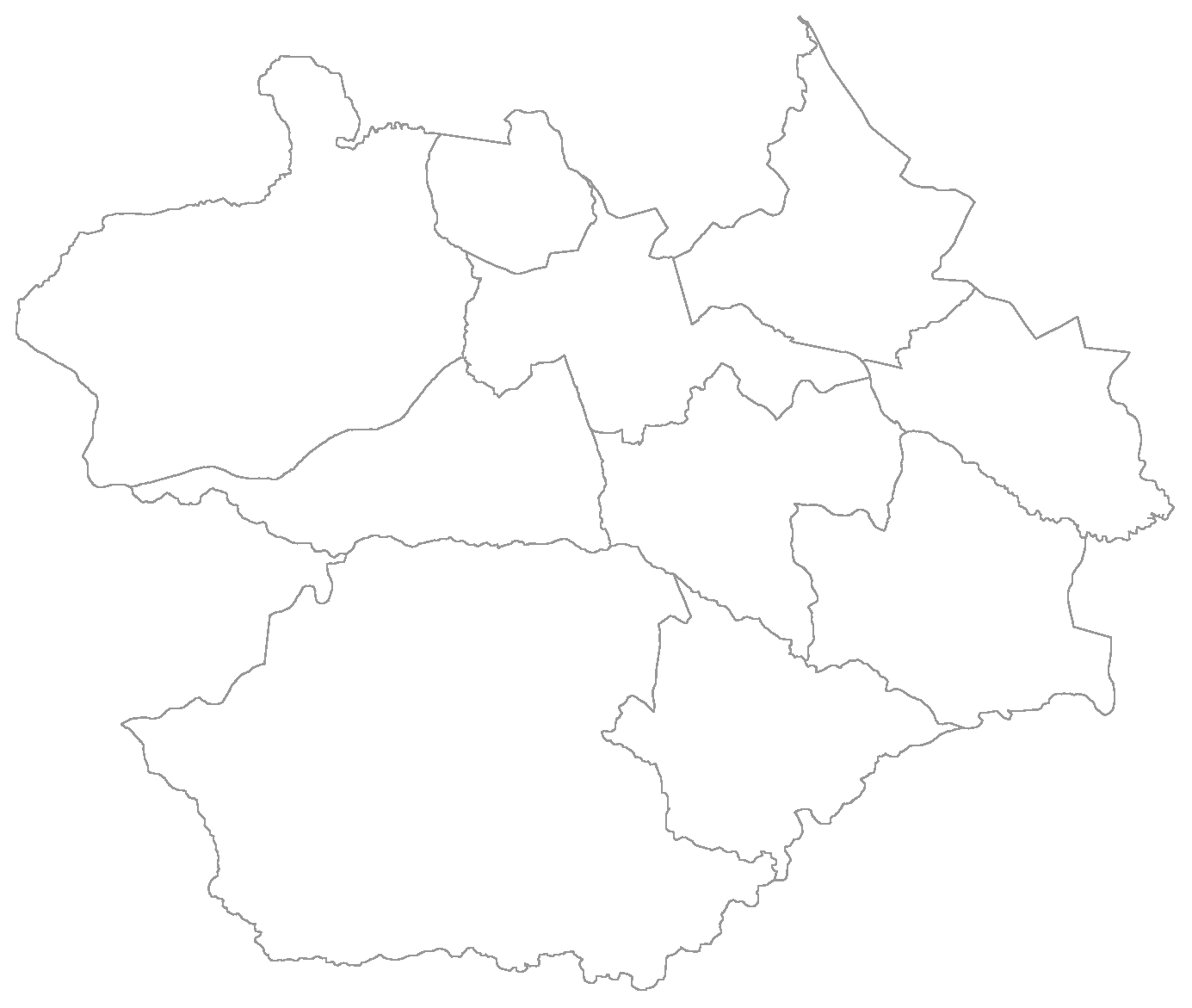
Map of the municipality of Santa Maria, Rio Grande do Sul, Brazil showing the division by districts.

The district limits with the districts of Pains, Palma, and, Passo do Verde, and, with the municipalities of Restinga Seca and Formigueiro.

== Neighbourhoods ==
The district of Arroio do Só is divided in the following bairros, that in English is equivalent to neighbourhoods:

- Arroio do Só;

== Roads and railway ==
- In the district there isn't roadway;
- In the district there is railway of América Latina Logística.;

== See also ==
- District of Arroio do Só, in Portuguese Wikipedia.
