= Santa Flora, Santa Maria =

Santa Flora
- Bairro
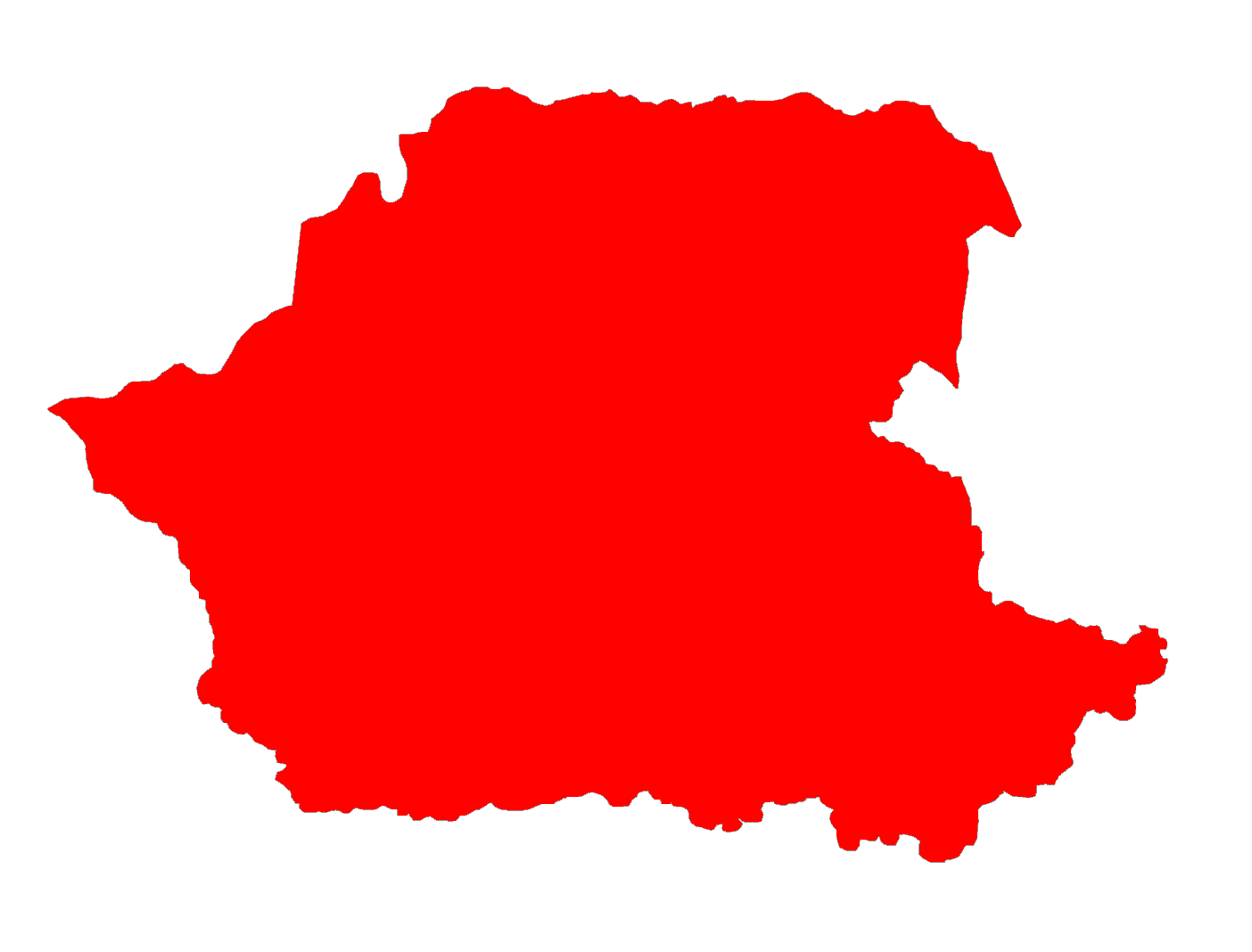
- The bairro in District of Santa Flora

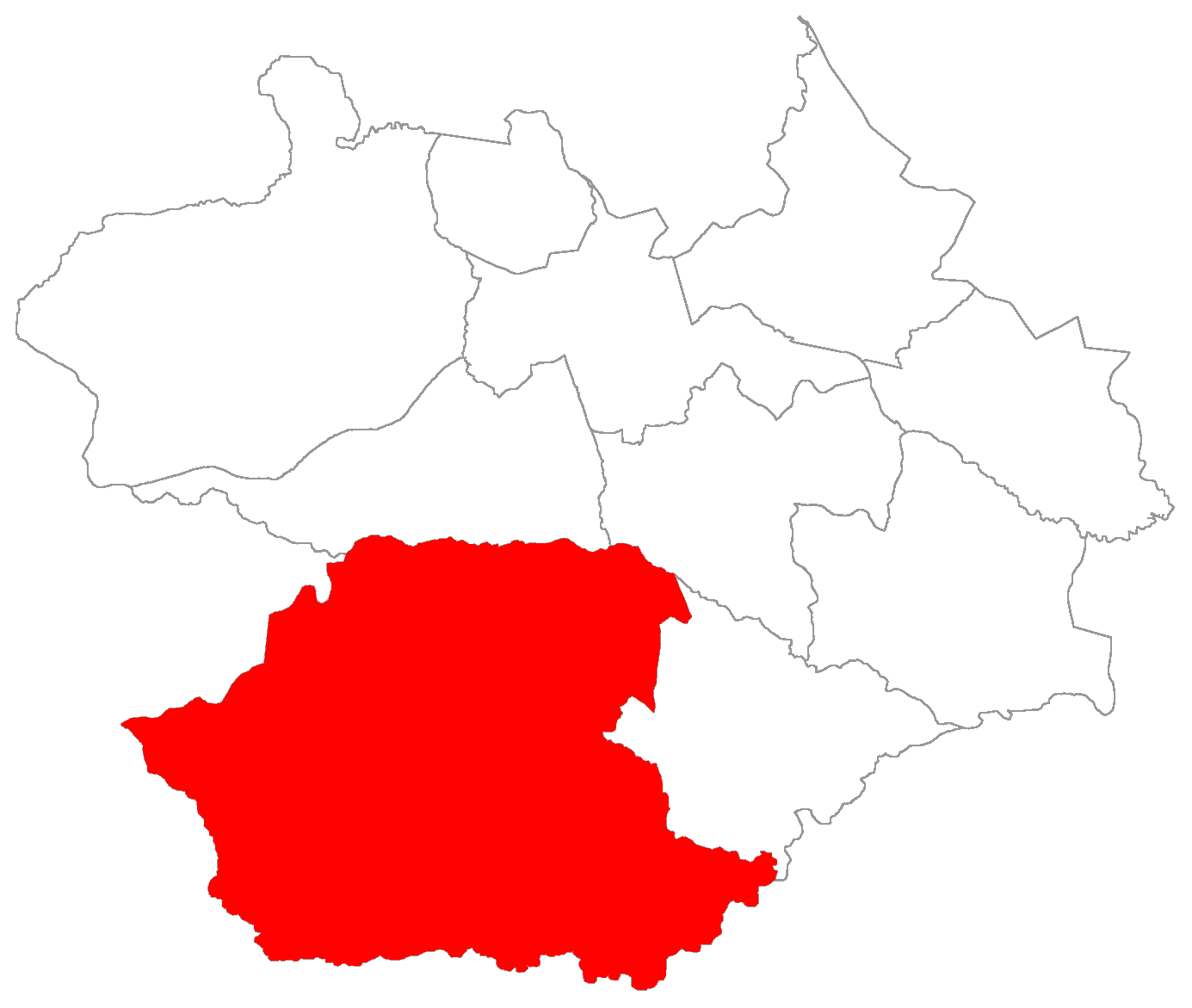
- District of Santa Flora, in Santa Maria City, Rio Grande do Sul, Brazil
- Coordinates: 29°53′03.66″S 53°52′50.72″W
- Country: Brazil
- State: Rio Grande do Sul
- Municipality/City: Santa Maria
- District: District of Santa Flora

Area
  - Total: 508.52 km^{2} (196.34 sq mi)

Population
  - Total: 1,074
  - Density: 2.112/km^{2} (5.470/sq mi)
- Postal code: 97.160-000
- Adjacent bairros: Pains, Passo do Verde, São Valentim
- Website: Official site of Santa Maria

Santa Flora ("Saint Flora") is a bairro in the District of Santa Flora in the municipality of Santa Maria, in the Brazilian state of Rio Grande do Sul. It is situated in south of Santa Maria.

== Villages ==
The bairro contains the following villages: Banhadinho, Banhados, Carangueijo, Carvalhas, Casa Branca, Colônia Favorita, Colônia Grápia, Colônia Pedro Carlos, Colônia Pena, Colônia Pinheiro, Colônia Vacacaí, Coxilha Bonita, Galpões, Passo da Lagoa, Passo do Pavão, Rincão da Limeira, Rincão da Ramada, Rincão da Várzea, Rincão do Araçá, Rincão do Carangueijo, Rincão do Jacaré, Rincão dos Banhados, Rincão dos Pires, Rincão Grande, Santa Flora, Vila Santa Flora.
