= Iberê Camargo =

Brazilian painter

- Born: 18 November 1914; Restinga Seca, Brazil
- Died: 8 August 1994 (aged 79); Porto Alegre, Brazil
- Known for: Painting
- Movement: Expressionism
- Spouse: Maria Coussirat

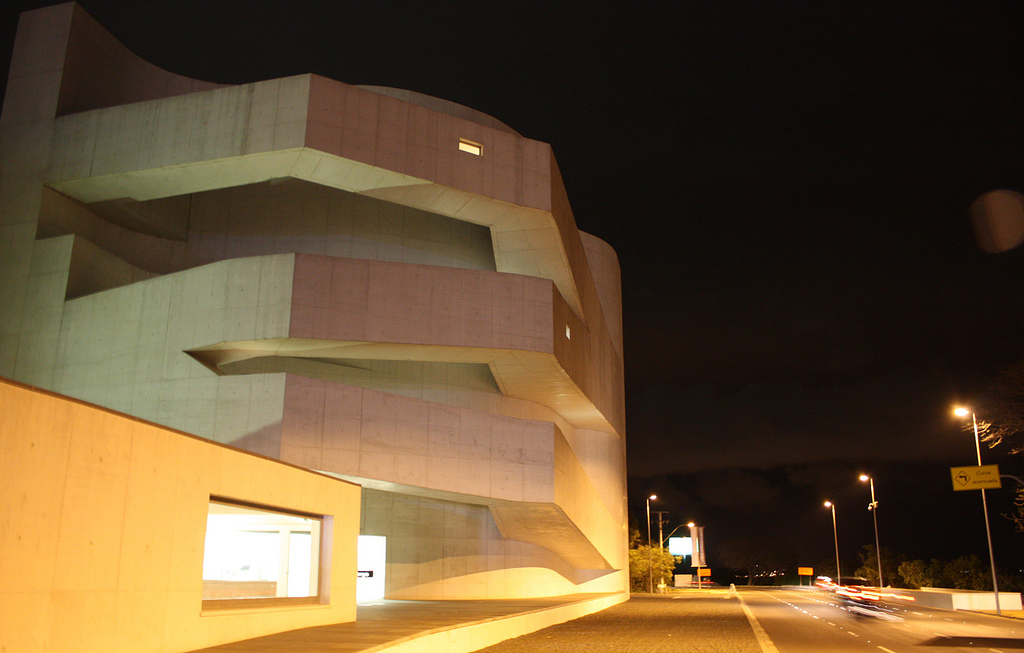
Iberê Camargo Foundation museum in Porto Alegre.

Iberê Bassani Camargo (18 November 1914, in Restinga Seca – 8 August 1994, in Porto Alegre) was a Brazilian painter, one of the greatest expressionist artists from his country.

Throughout his life, Iberê Camargo was a prominent leader in artistic and intellectual circles.

Shortly after his death, the Iberê Camargo Foundation was created by his widow, Maria Coussirat Camargo. Since 2008, the Foundation headquarters and museum is located in a building designed by Portuguese architect Álvaro Siza. Thousands of paintings by Camargo are on display there.
