= Passo do Verde =

- Bairro
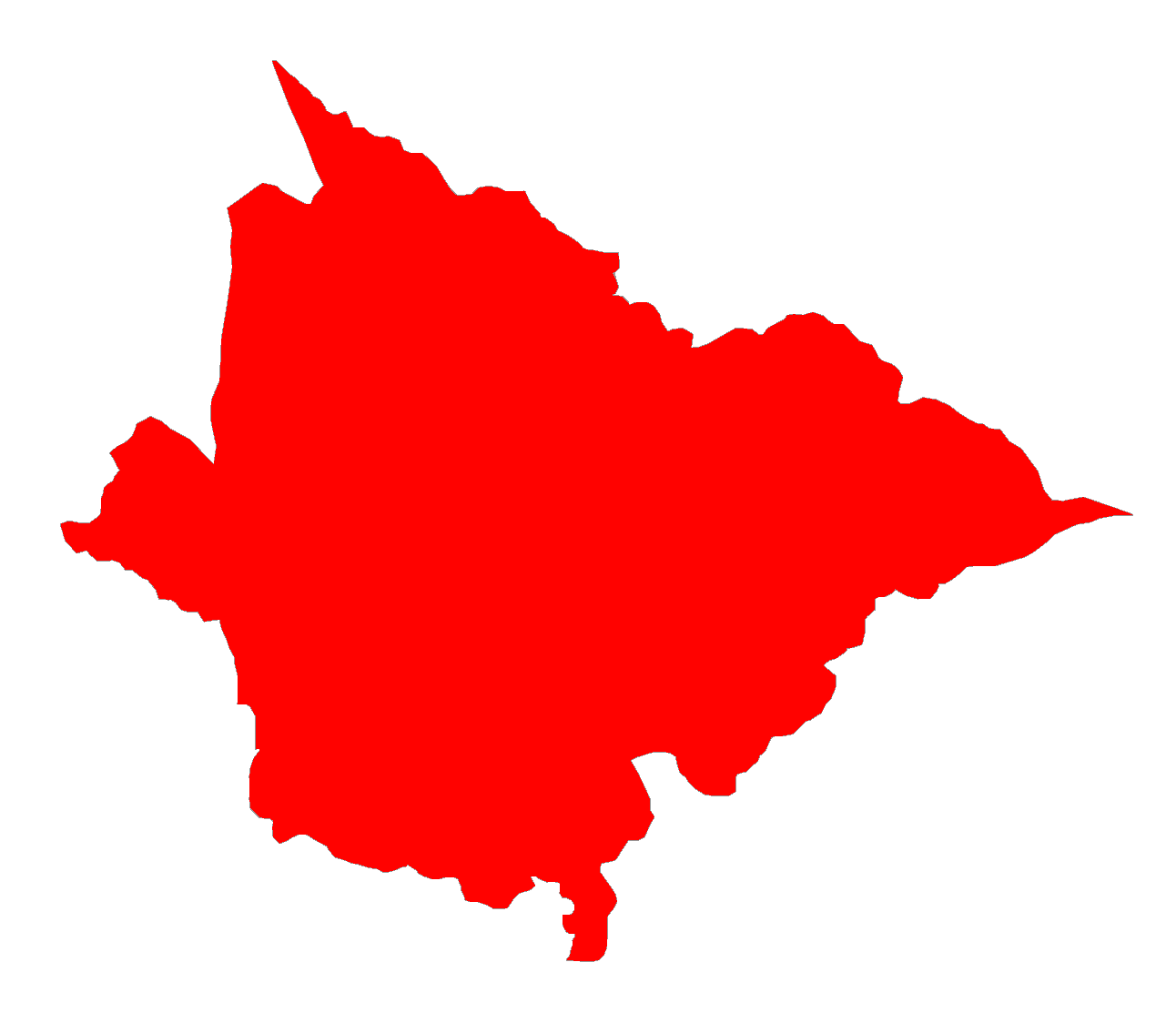
- The bairro in District of Passo do Verde

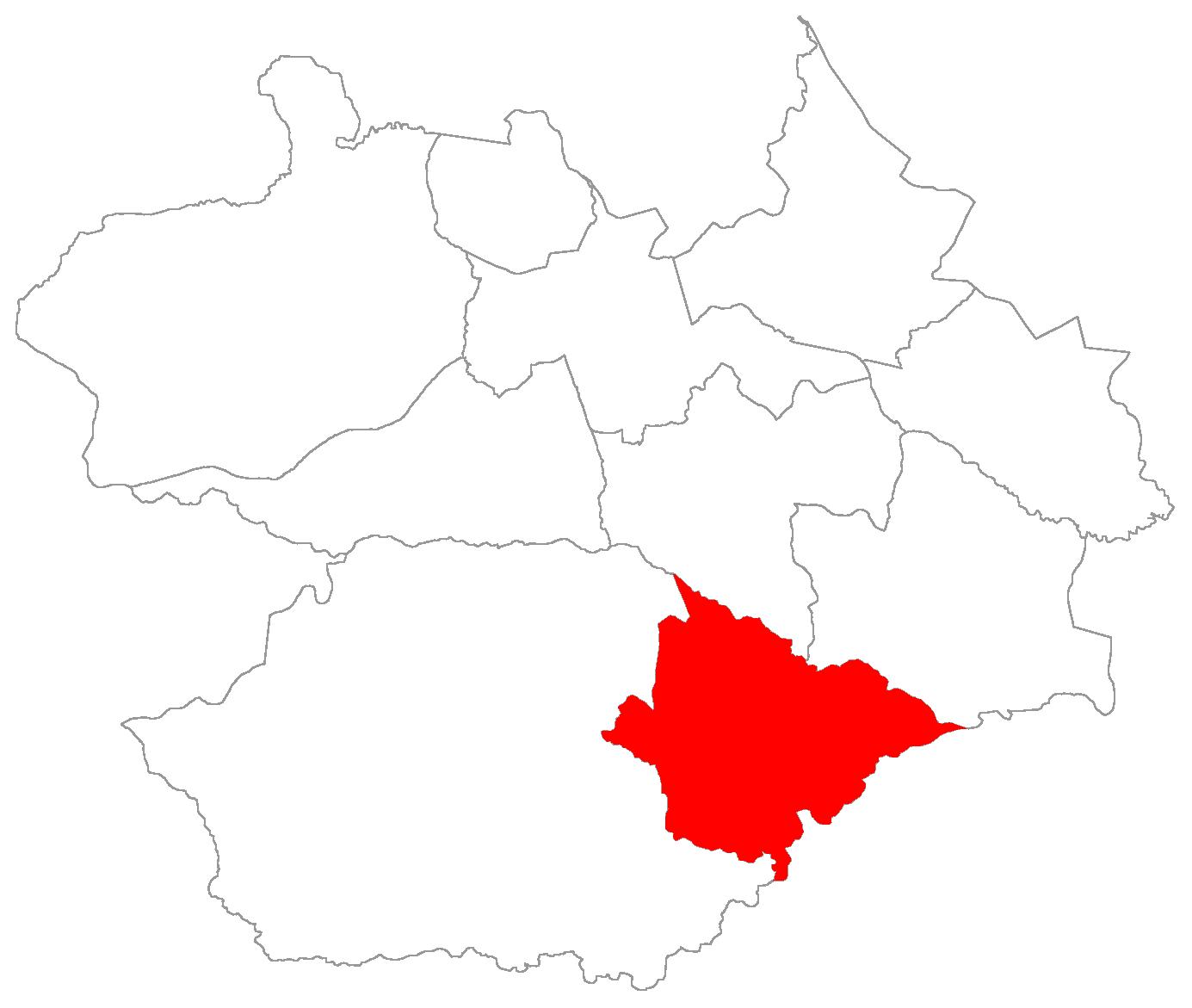
- District of Passo do Verde, in Santa Maria City, Rio Grande do Sul, Brazil
- Coordinates: 29°55′28.94″S 53°43′26.26″W
- Country: Brazil
- State: Rio Grande do Sul
- Municipality/City: Santa Maria
- District: District of Passo do Verde

Area
  - Total: 133.40 km^{2} (51.51 sq mi)

Population
  - Total: 531
  - Density: 3.98/km^{2} (10.3/sq mi)
- Postal code: 97.150-000
- Adjacent bairros: Arroio do Só, Pains, Santa Flora
- Website: Official site of Santa Maria

Passo do Verde (Portuguese pronunciation: [ˈpasu du ˈveʁdʒi]; "green pitch") is a bairro in the District of Passo do Verde in the municipality of Santa Maria, in the Brazilian state of Rio Grande do Sul. It is situated in the south of Santa Maria.

== Villages ==
The bairro contains the following villages: Passo do Verde, Passo Velho do Arenal, Arenal, Colônia Pena, Mato Alto, Vila Passo do Verde.
