= Formigueiro =

Municipality of Rio Grande do Sul, Brazil

- Municipality
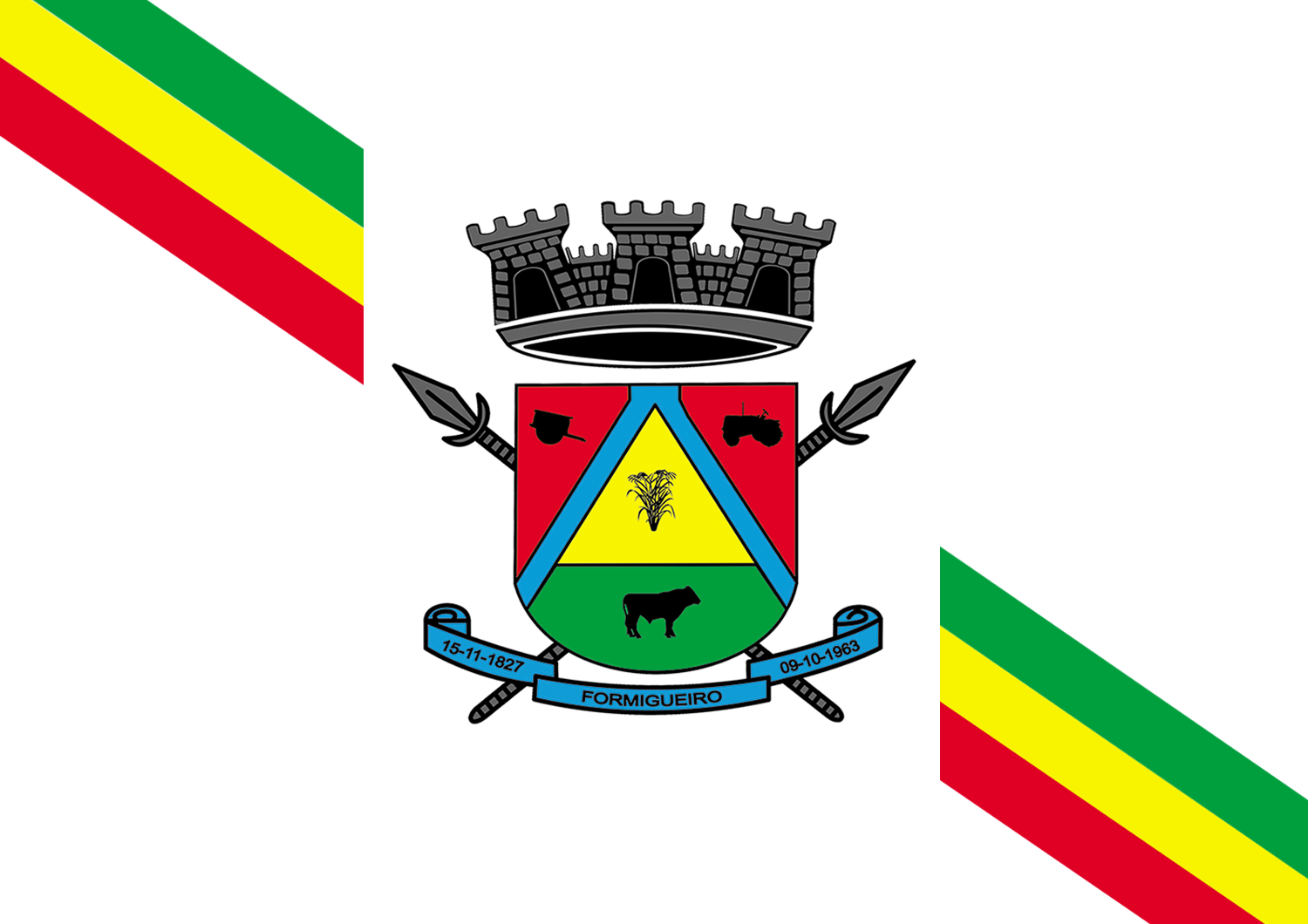
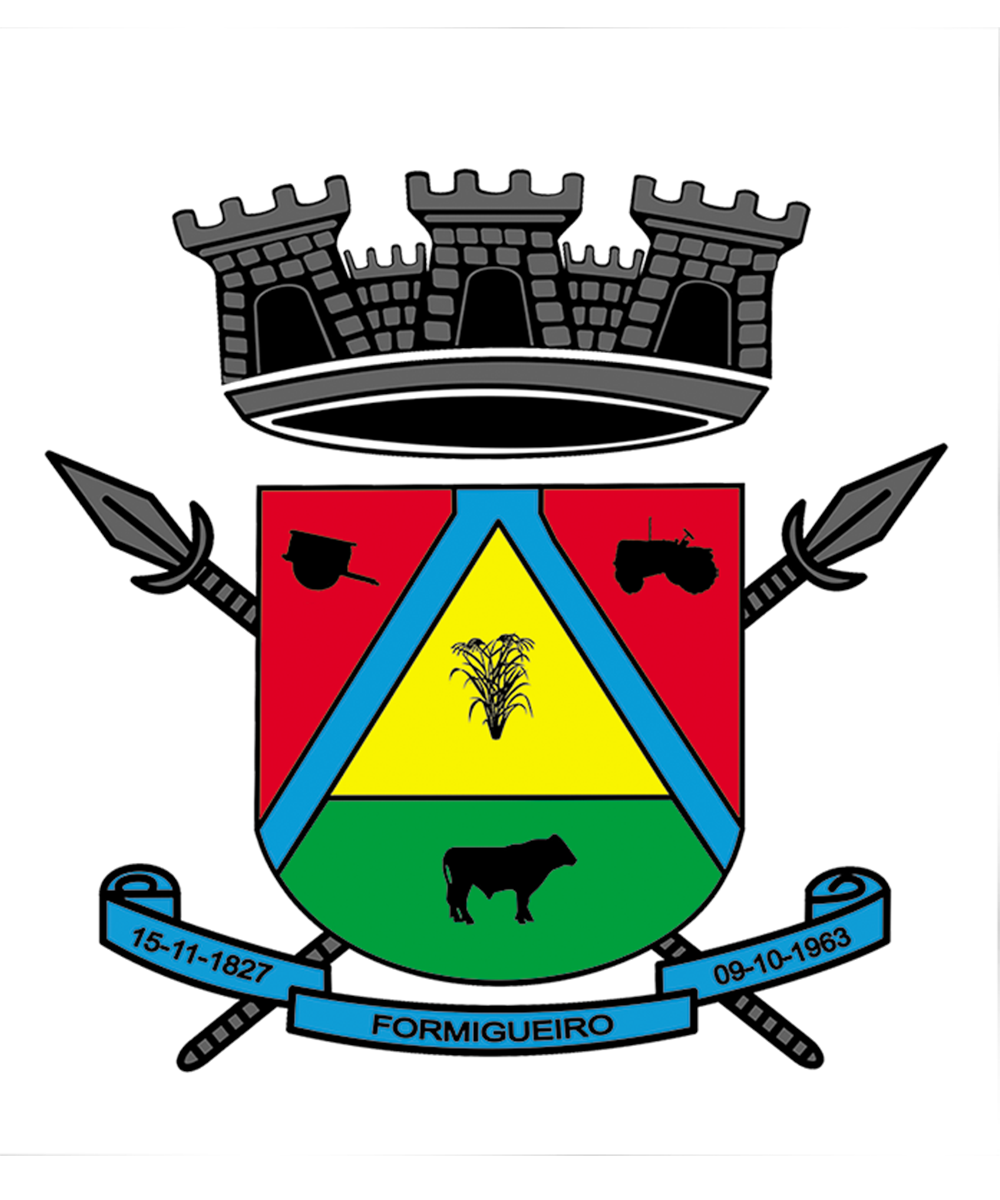
- Flag Coat of arms

- Location within Rio Grande do Sul

- Location in Brazil
- Coordinates: 30°0′0″S 53°29′56″W
- Country: Brazil
- State: Rio Grande do Sul

Population (2022)
  - Total: 6,413
- Time zone: UTC−3 (BRT)

Formigueiro is a municipality in the state of Rio Grande do Sul, Brazil.

== See also ==
- List of municipalities in Rio Grande do Sul
