= Restinga Seca =

Municipality of Rio Grande do Sul, Brazil

- Municipality
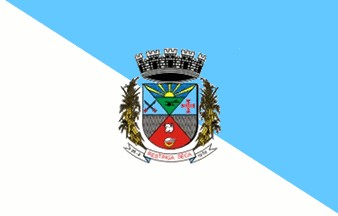
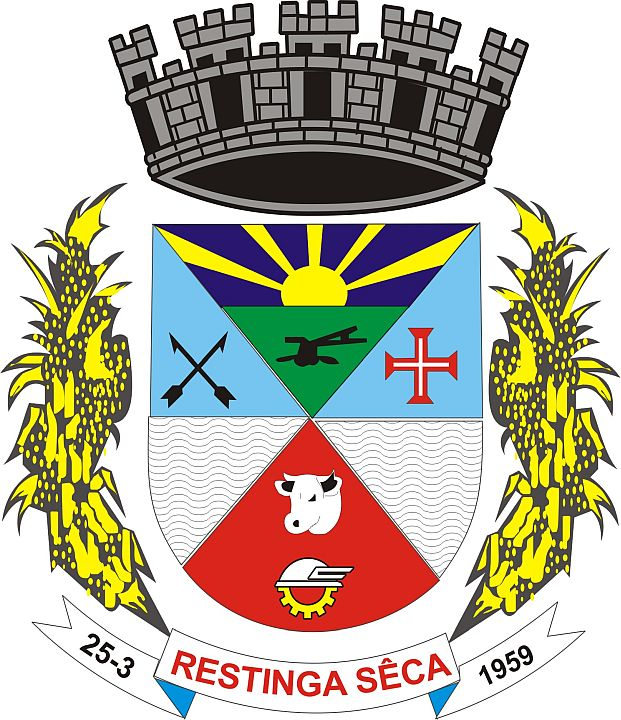
- Flag Coat of arms

- Location within Rio Grande do Sul

- Location in Brazil
- Coordinates: 29°49′S 53°23′W
- Country: Brazil
- State: Rio Grande do Sul

Population (2020)
  - Total: 15,744
- Time zone: UTC−3 (BRT)

Restinga Seca is a municipality in the state of Rio Grande do Sul, Brazil.

== See also ==
- List of municipalities in Rio Grande do Sul
