= São Sepé =

Municipality of Rio Grande do Sul, Brazil

- Municipality
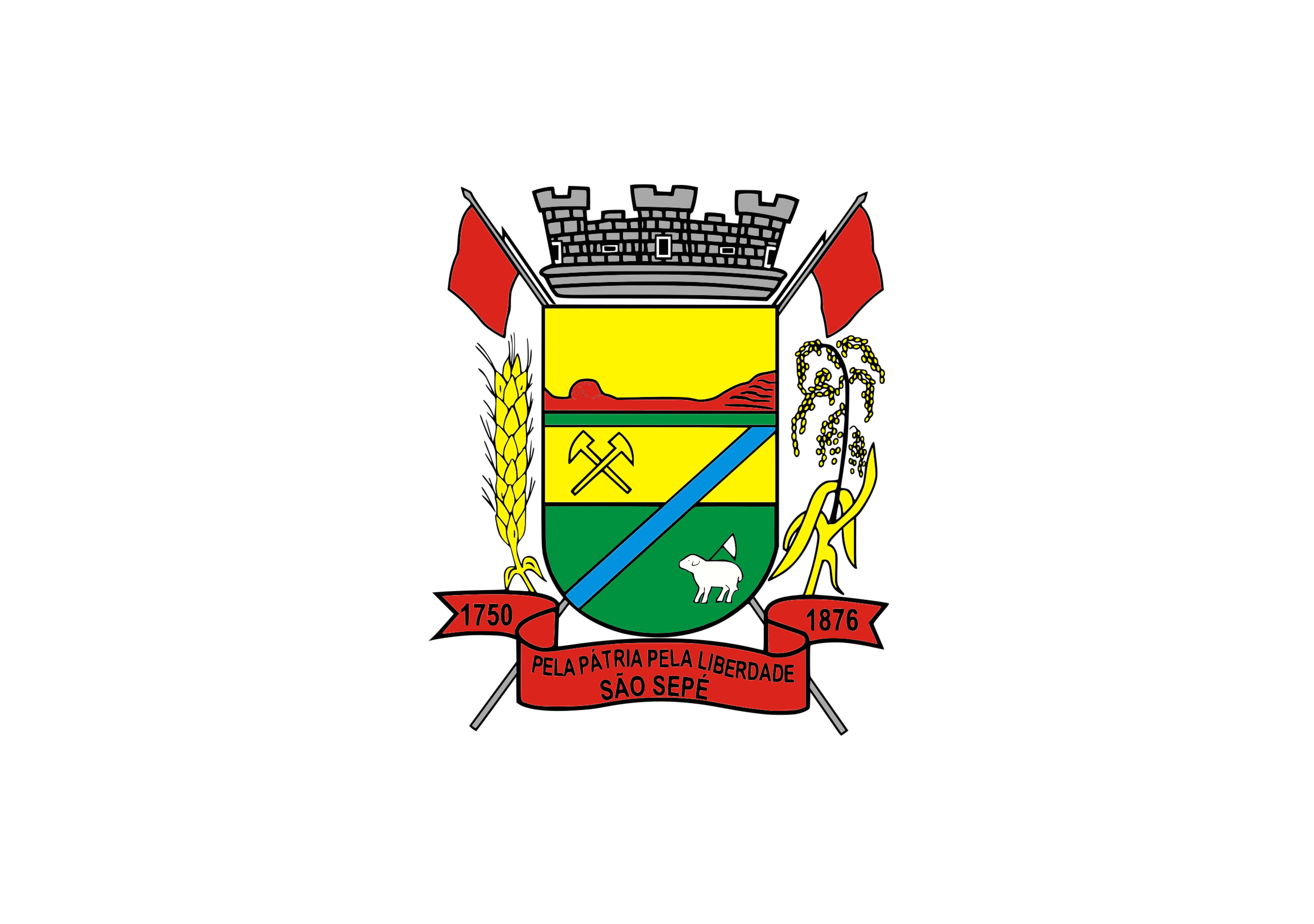
- Flag Coat of arms

- Location within Rio Grande do Sul

- Location in Brazil
- Coordinates: 30°10′S 53°34′W
- Country: Brazil
- State: Rio Grande do Sul

Population (2025)
  - Total: 21,551
  - Urban (City/Town): 17,019
- Time zone: UTC−3 (BRT)

São Sepé is a municipality in the state of Rio Grande do Sul, Brazil.

== See also ==
- List of municipalities in Rio Grande do Sul
