= BR-392 (Brazil highway) =

Highway in Brazil

BR-392

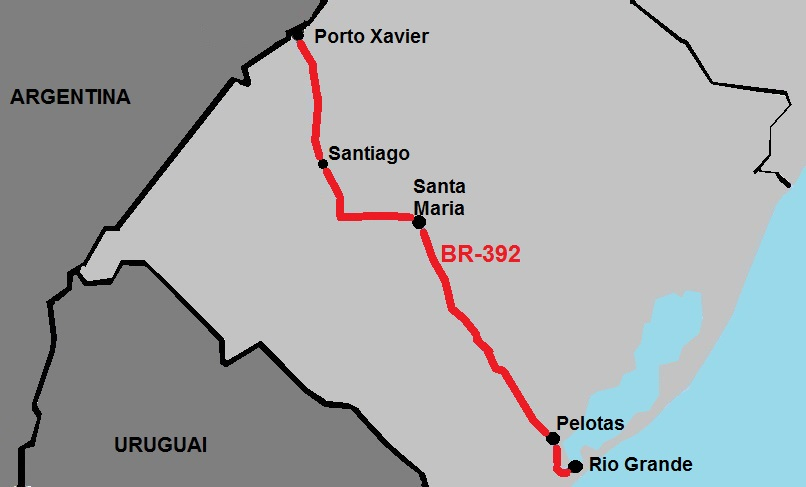
- BR-392 in Santa Maria, RS

Route information
- Length: 718.8 km (446.6 mi)

Major junctions
- south end: Rio Grande, RS
- north end: Porto Xavier, RS

Location
- Country: Brazil
- State: Rio Grande do Sul

Highway system
- Highways in Brazil; Federal; Rio Grande do Sul State Highways

BR-392 is a federal highway in Rio Grande do Sul. The highway begins at the port town of Rio Grande in the south and runs north across the state, connecting the municipalities of Pelotas, Santa Maria, Santo Ângelo, and ending in Porto Xavier on the border with Argentina.

== Gallery ==
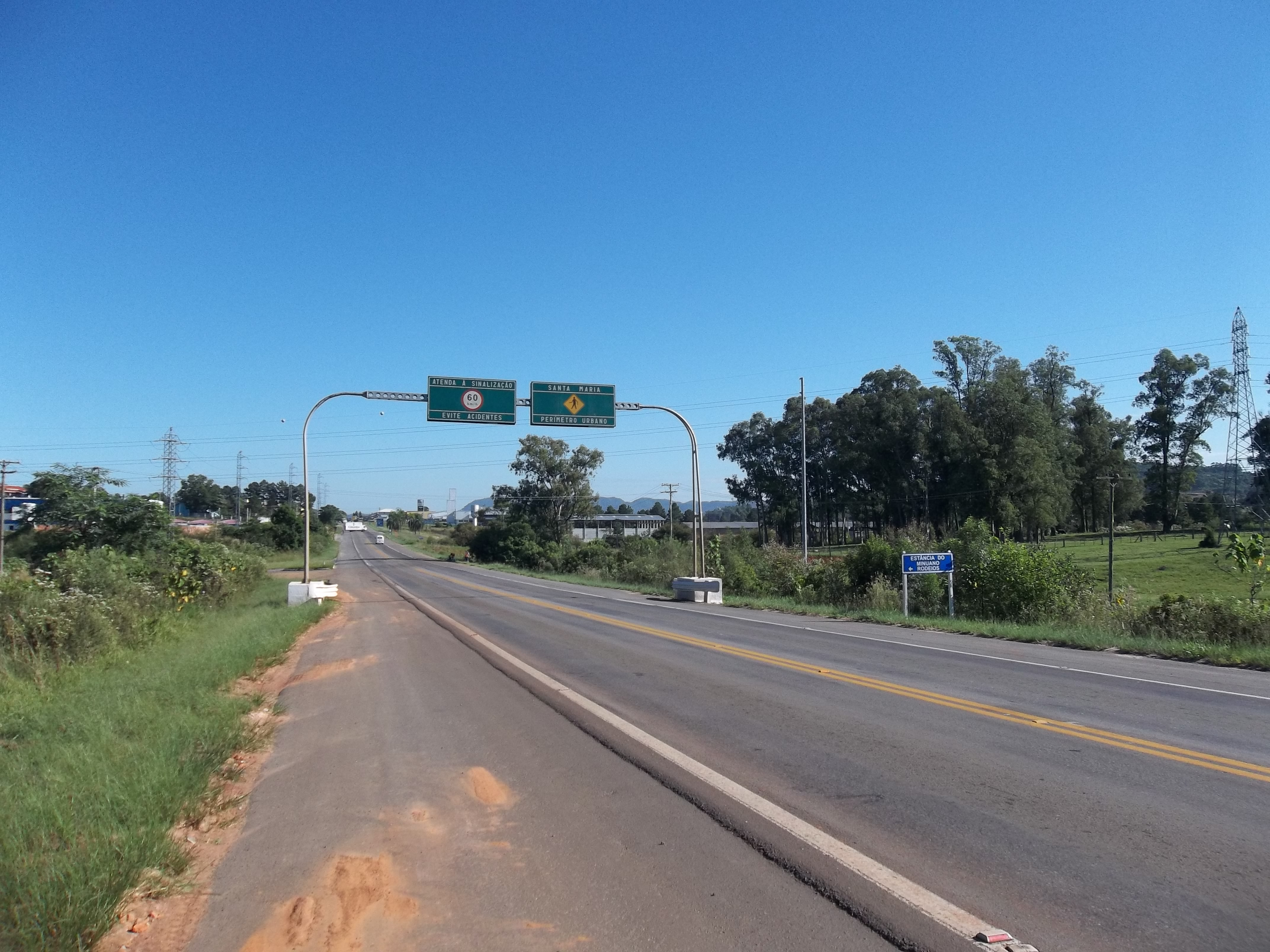
BR-392 in Santa Maria, Rio Grande do Sul

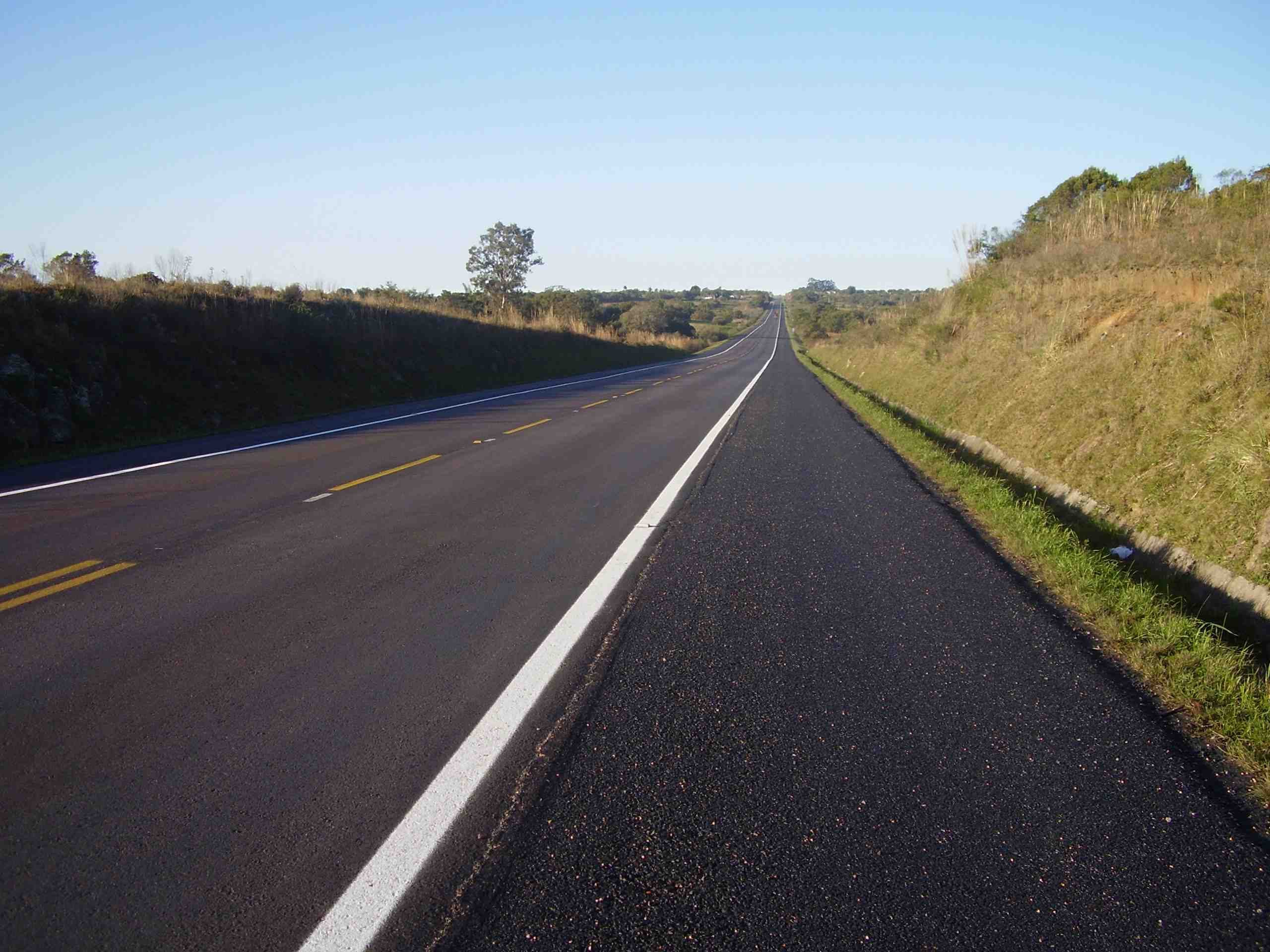
BR-392 in Rio Grande do Sul
