= Dilermando de Aguiar =

Municipality of Rio Grande do Sul, Brazil

- Municipality
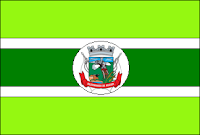
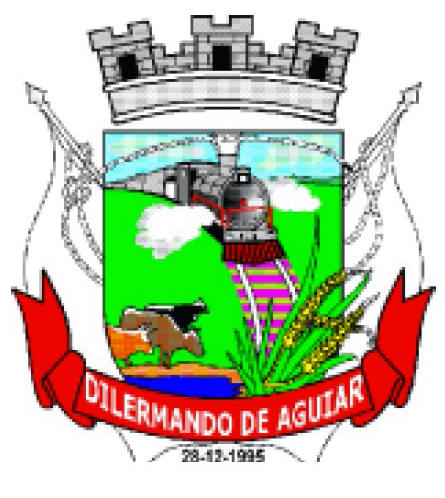
- Flag Coat of arms

- Location within Rio Grande do Sul

- Location in Brazil
- Coordinates: 29°42′21″S 54°12′28″W
- Country: Brazil
- State: Rio Grande do Sul

Population (2022)
  - Total: 2,806
- Time zone: UTC−3 (BRT)

Dilermando de Aguiar is a municipality in the state of Rio Grande do Sul, Brazil.

== Paleontology ==
In this city there are outcrops of Sanga do Cabral Formation, the (Railroad abandoned between Dilermando de Aguiar and São Gabriel). Early Triassic age.

== See also ==
- List of municipalities in Rio Grande do Sul
