= Subprefect =

Government official at the local level under the authority of a prefect

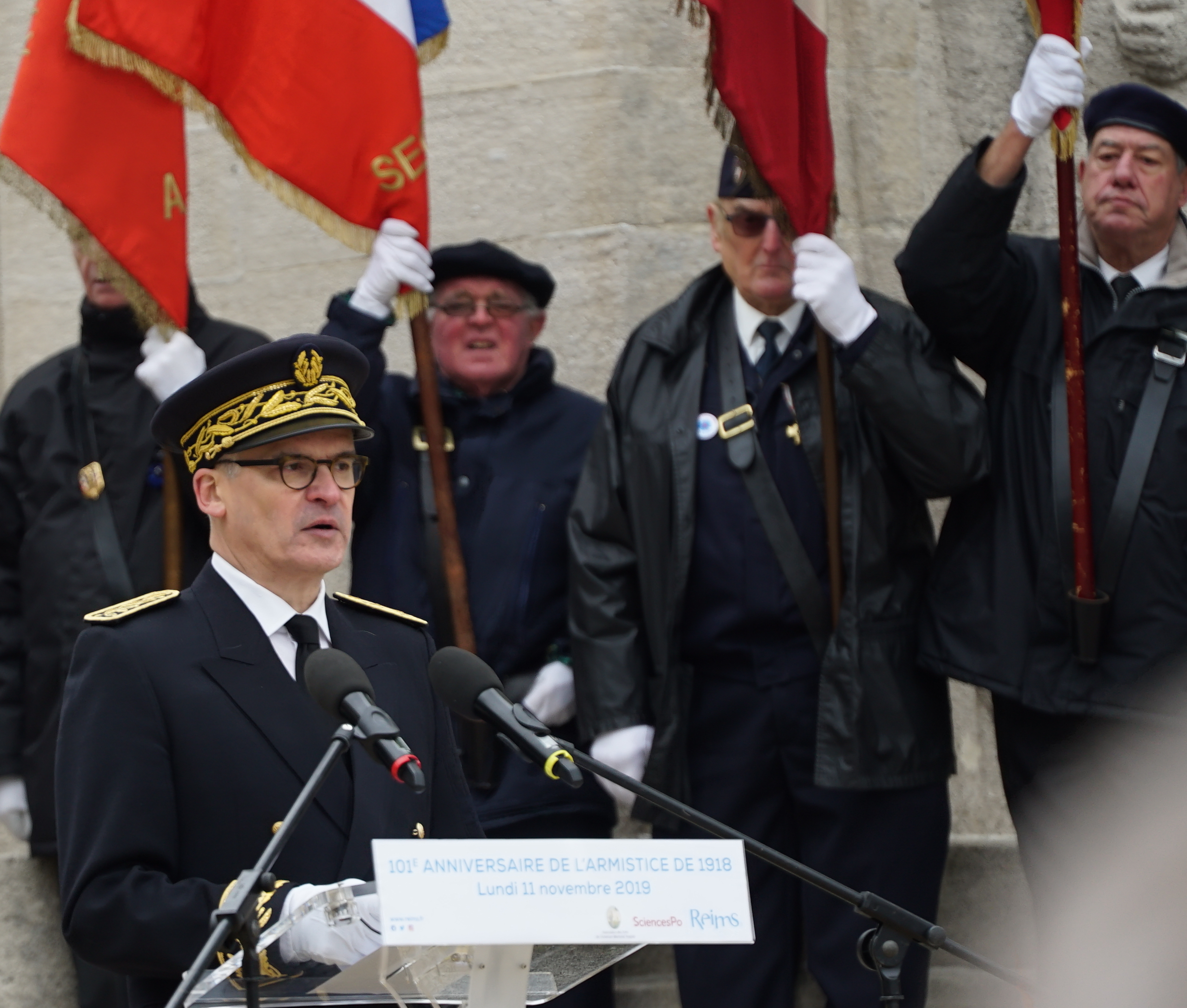
Jacques Lucbereilh, the French subprefect of the arrondissement of Reims, 2019

A subprefect is a senior government official in several countries at the local level, such as Brazil and France.

== Brazil ==
In Brazil, a subprefect (subprefeito) is the highest official of a subprefecture, which is a subdivision of certain large municipalities (São Paulo, Rio de Janeiro). The subprefect serves under the municipality's prefect (prefeito).

== France ==
In France, a subprefect (sous-préfet, [supʁefɛ]) is the top official in a departmental arrondissement that is not the arrondissement of the prefecture. The subprefect, who is appointed by the President of France, serves under the department's prefect (préfet).
