= Subprefecture =

Administrative division of a country that is below prefecture

A subprefecture is an administrative division of a country that is below prefecture or province.

== Albania ==
There are twelve Albanian counties or prefectures, each of which is divided into several districts, sometimes translated as subprefectures.

Examples: District of Korçë, District of Sarandë

== Brazil ==
In Brazil the subprefectures (Portuguese: subprefeituras) are administrative divisions of some big cities, such as São Paulo and Rio de Janeiro. The head of a subprefecture, the subprefeito, is indicated by the municipality's mayor (in Brazil called prefeito).

In São Paulo there are 32 subprefectures. The largest in total area, Parelheiros, covers 353.5 km^{2}, and the most populous, Capela do Socorro, has more than 600,000 inhabitants.

== Burkina Faso ==
Example: Djibasso Subprefecture

== Chad ==
Examples: N'Gouri Subprefecture, Massakory Subprefecture

== China ==
It was used in Qing dynasty. Called ting (廳 or 厅) in Chinese, it is also on the same level as a department (州) and a district (縣), and is below a prefecture (府).

Example:

- Aihun Ting in the late-Qing Heilongjiang

A separate term also translated as subprefecture was jūnmínfǔ (t 軍民府, s 军民府), for instance at Qianshan in Guangdong.

== France ==
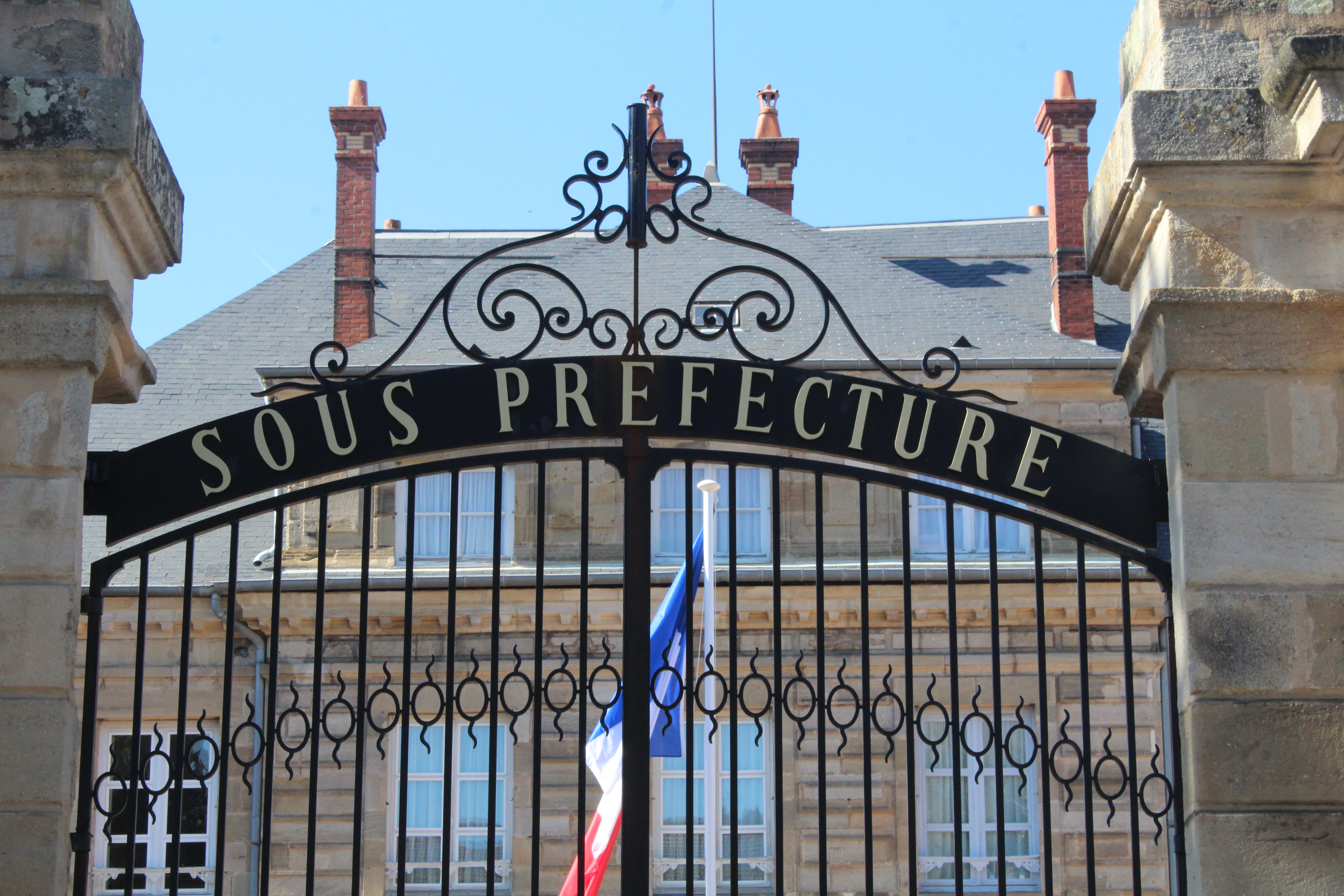
Sous-préfecture in Autun, Saône-et-Loire, France

A subprefecture is the administrative town of an arrondissement where an arrondissement does not contain the prefecture. The civil servant in charge of local executive power is the sous-préfet.

Examples: Aix-en-Provence, Apt, Arles, Bayonne, Boulogne-Billancourt, Boulogne-sur-Mer, Calais, Cambrai, Chalon-sur-Saône, Château-Thierry, Cherbourg, Le Havre, Narbonne, Reims, Saint-Germain-en-Laye, Saint-Malo, Saint-Omer, Sedan, Vichy.

== Ivory Coast ==
A sous-préfecture is an administrative division of a department in Ivory Coast.

Examples: Anyama Subprefecture, Bingerville Subprefecture, Brofodoumé Subprefecture, Songon Subprefecture

== Japan ==
Some Japanese prefectures have branch offices called 支庁 (shichō) in Japanese, which are translated in English as "subprefectures", "branch offices", or "branches of the prefectural government". See details in Subprefectures of Japan and an example of Kushiro Subprefecture.

== Taiwan ==
- The word "subprefecture" is used to translate the term tīng (廳) from Chinese. This was a type of subdivision under Qing dynasty rule.

- Examples include Tamsui Subprefecture (淡水廳 dàn shuĭ tīng) and Kavalan (Ga'malan) Subprefecture (噶瑪蘭廳 gá mă lán tīng, of Yilan City) (both in Taiwan).

- Under Japanese rule, the term 廳 (chō) is translated to prefecture, so 支廳 (shichō) is translated to subprefecture.
