= Santo Antão, Santa Maria (district) =

District of Santo Antão Santo Antão, the 10th district of Santa Maria
- District
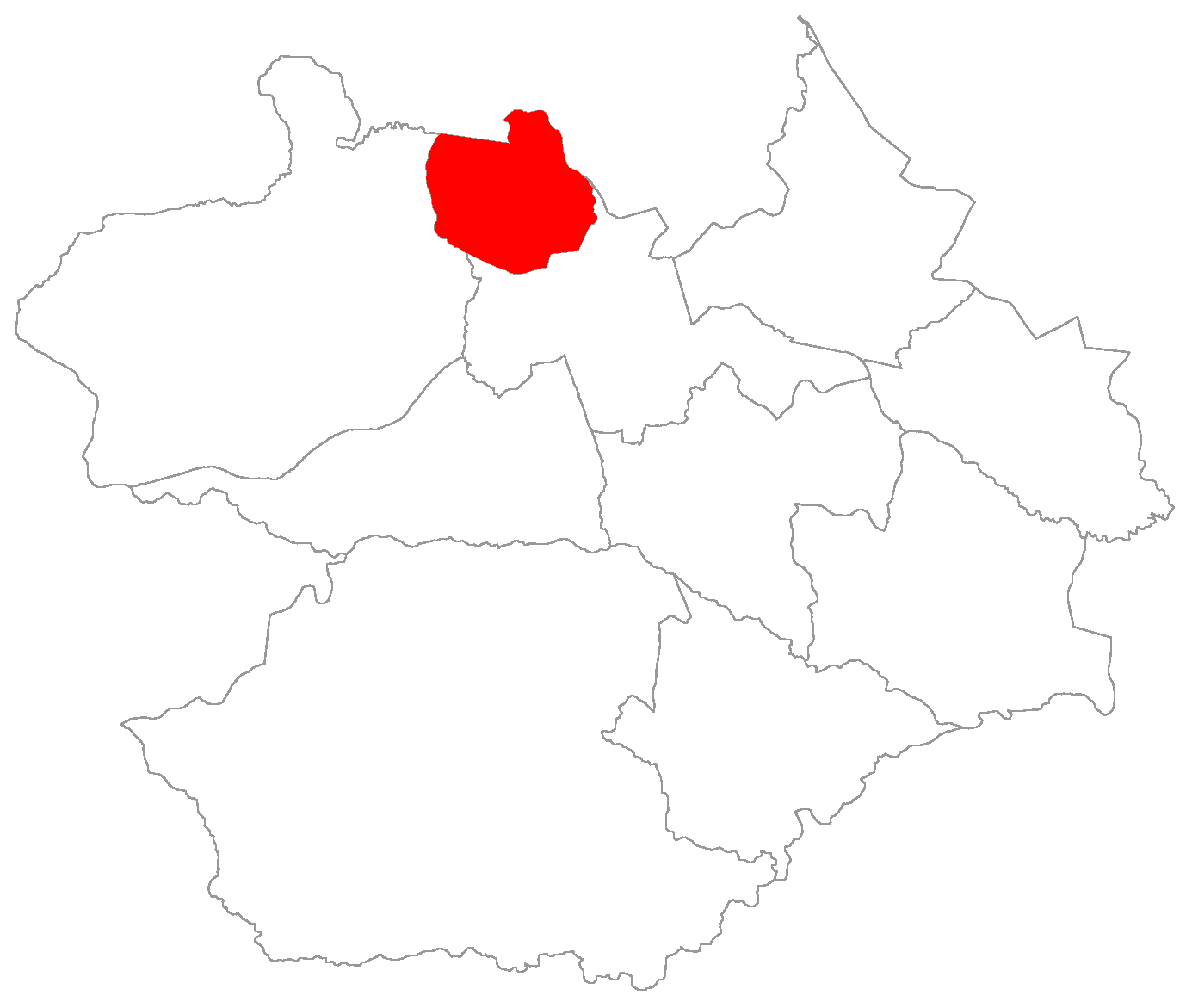
- District of Santo Antão, in Santa Maria City, Rio Grande do Sul, Brazil
- Coordinates: 29°37′49.20″S 53°51′37.29″W
- Country: Brazil
- State: Rio Grande do Sul
- municipality: Santa Maria

Government
  - Type: Subprefecture
  - Body: Subprefect

Area
  - District: 51.33 km^{2} (19.82 sq mi)
- Highest elevation: 450 m (1,480 ft)
- Lowest elevation: 80 m (260 ft)

Population
  - District: 807
  - Rank: 8th of 10
  - Density: 15.7/km^{2} (40.7/sq mi)
  - Urban: 16
  - Rural: 791
- Neighbourhoods: 1
- Adjacent districts: Boca do Monte, Sede
- Website: Official site of Santa Maria

Santo Antão ("Santo Antão" - Portuguese for Saint Anthony) is a district of the municipality of Santa Maria, in the Brazilian state of Rio Grande do Sul. It is situated in the north portion of Santa Maria. The district's seat is 11 km (6.84 miles) far from Downtown Santa Maria.

The district of Santo Antão owns an area of 51.33 km^{2} that is equivalent to 8.86% of the municipality of Santa Maria that is 1791,65 km^{2}.

== History ==
The district was created in the year of 2001 by municipal law nº 4498/01 with territory separated from district of Boca do Monte.

== Limits ==
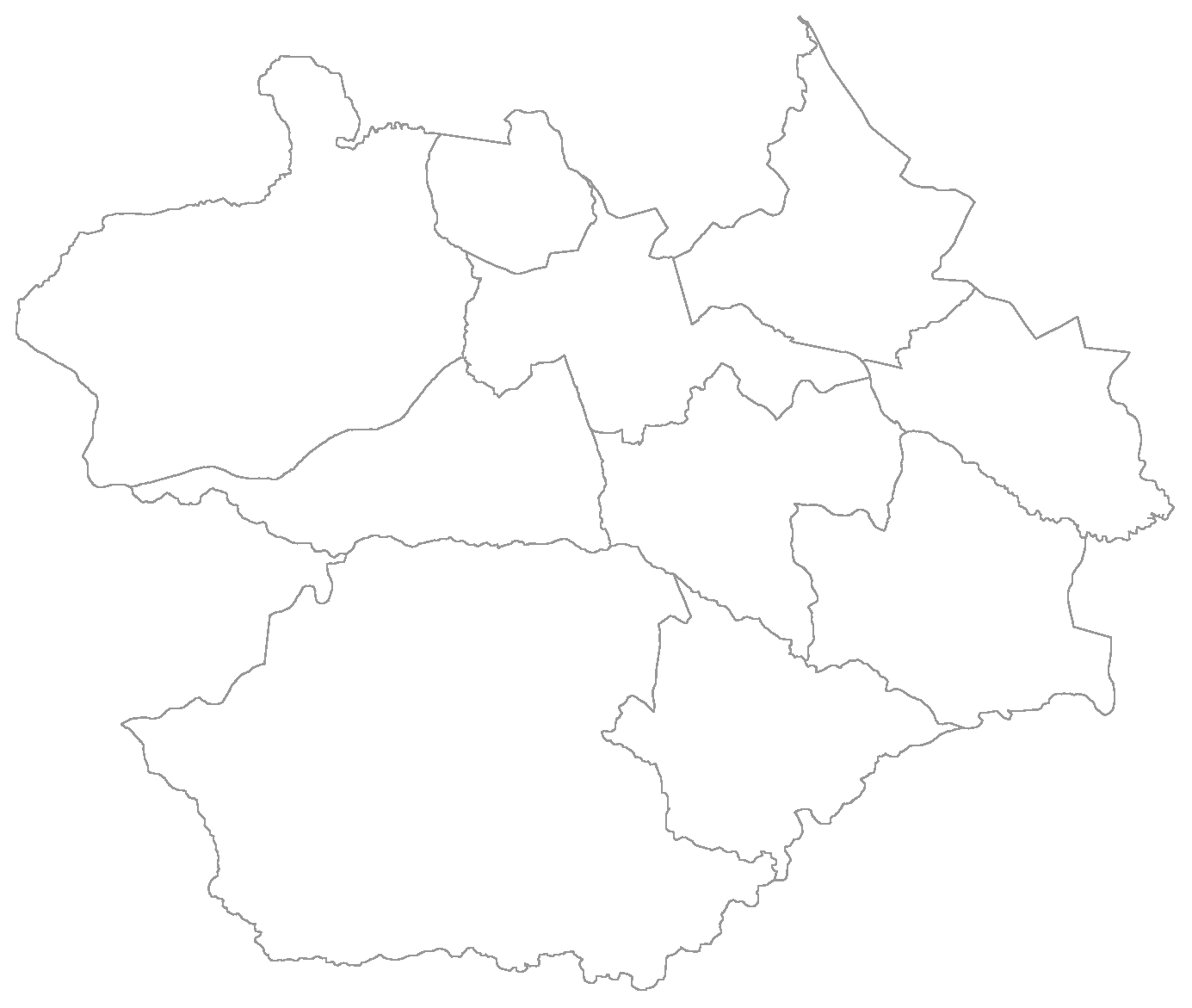
Map of the municipality of Santa Maria, Rio Grande do Sul, Brazil showing the division by districts.

The district limits with the districts of Boca do Monte and Sede, and with the municipalities of Itaara and São Martinho da Serra

== Neighbourhoods ==
The district of Santo Antão is divided in the following bairros, that in English is equivalent to neighbourhoods:

- Santo Antão;

== Roads and railway ==
- In the district, the railway crosses in its south portion.
- There isn't highways in the district.
