= Nossa Senhora das Dores =

Nossa Senhora das Dores is Portuguese for Our Lady of Sorrows, a title of Mary.

It may also refer to the following places, named in her honor :

== Brazil ==
- Nossa Senhora das Dores, Santa Maria
- Nossa Senhora das Dores, Sergipe

== Cape Verde ==
- Nossa Senhora das Dores (Sal), the sole freguesia (civil parish) of Sal, Cape Verde (municipality), which also covers the whole island.

== See also ==
- Senhora das Dores Church
