= Paleontological Site of Agua Negra =

The Paleontological Site of Agua Negra is located in the Agua Negra in the city of São Martinho da Serra, Rio Grande do Sul, Brazil. The site is approximately 8 kilometers from the city of Santa Maria. The site belongs to the region paleorrota. Here the Unaysaurus was found .

== See also ==
- Paleorrota
- Paleontology
