= Superintendência Nacional de Abastecimento =

Brazilian federal government agency

Superintendência Nacional de Abastecimento (Sunab) was a Brazilian federal government agency, created in 1962 by President João Goulart and extinguished in 1997, in the first government of Fernando Henrique Cardoso.

== History ==
Price control in Brazil gained strength in the 1950s, with the creation of the Federal Commission of Supply and Prices (Cofap). On September 26, 1962, João Goulart signed Delegate Law No. 4, creating Sunab with the status of a federal agency, with powers to intervene in the market, setting prices and controlling stocks. In 1985, the agency became part of the structure of the Planning Secretariat (today part of the Ministry of Economy). It was then that the agency experienced its most important moment, as the central piece in the supervision of the price freeze established by the Cruzado Plan. It was again responsible for the elaboration of price lists in 1987, with the edition of the Bresser Plan.

In the 1990s, with the State reform and the adoption of a less interventionist economic policy, price control lost strength. Sunab started acting only in market researches, losing its inspection powers. On July 24, 1997, decree 2.280 extinguished the agency and transferred its obligations to the Ministry of Finance.

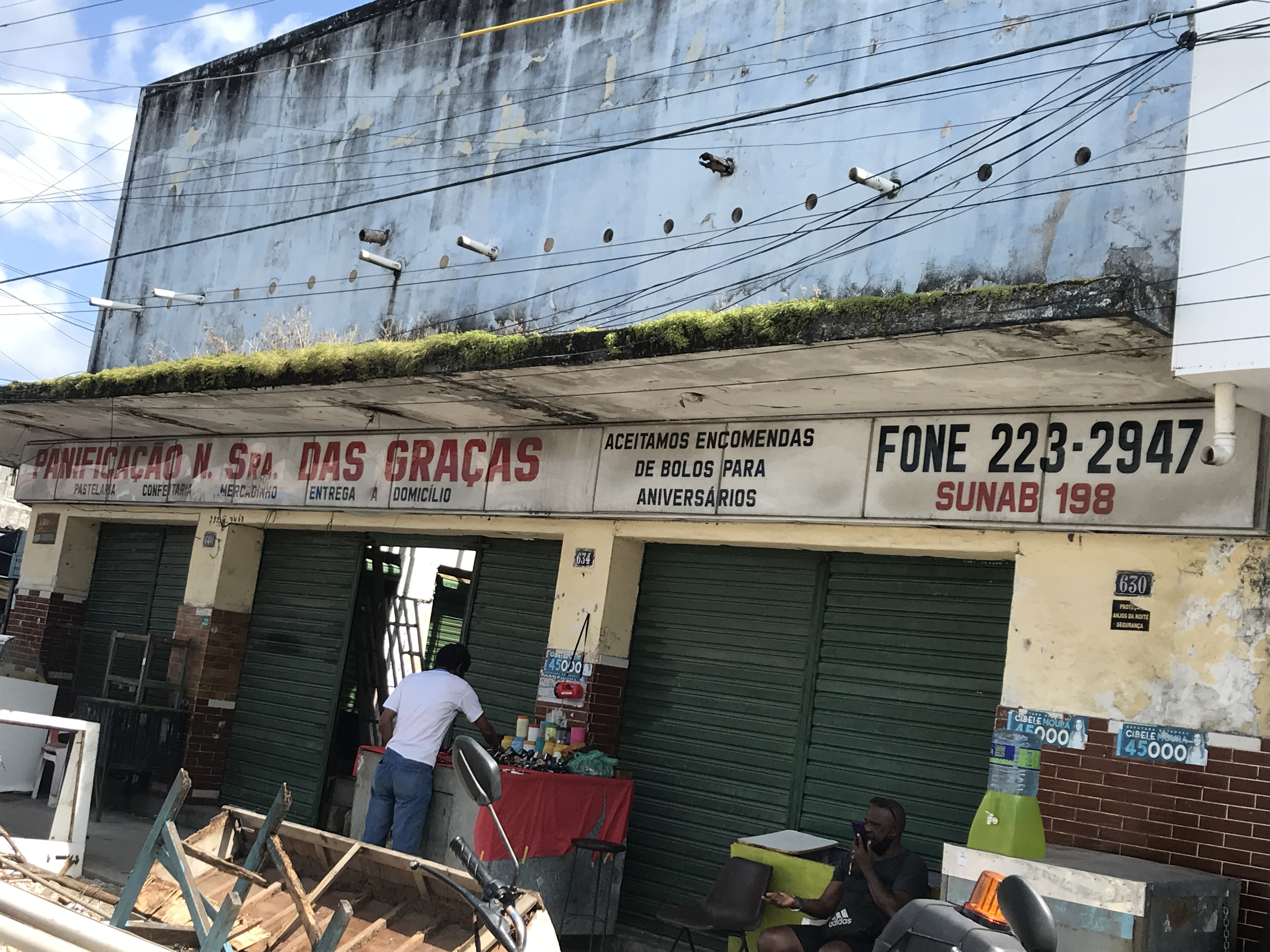
Facade of a bakery in Maceió-AL with the expression SUNAB 19
