= Nonoai, Santa Maria =

Nonoai
- Bairro
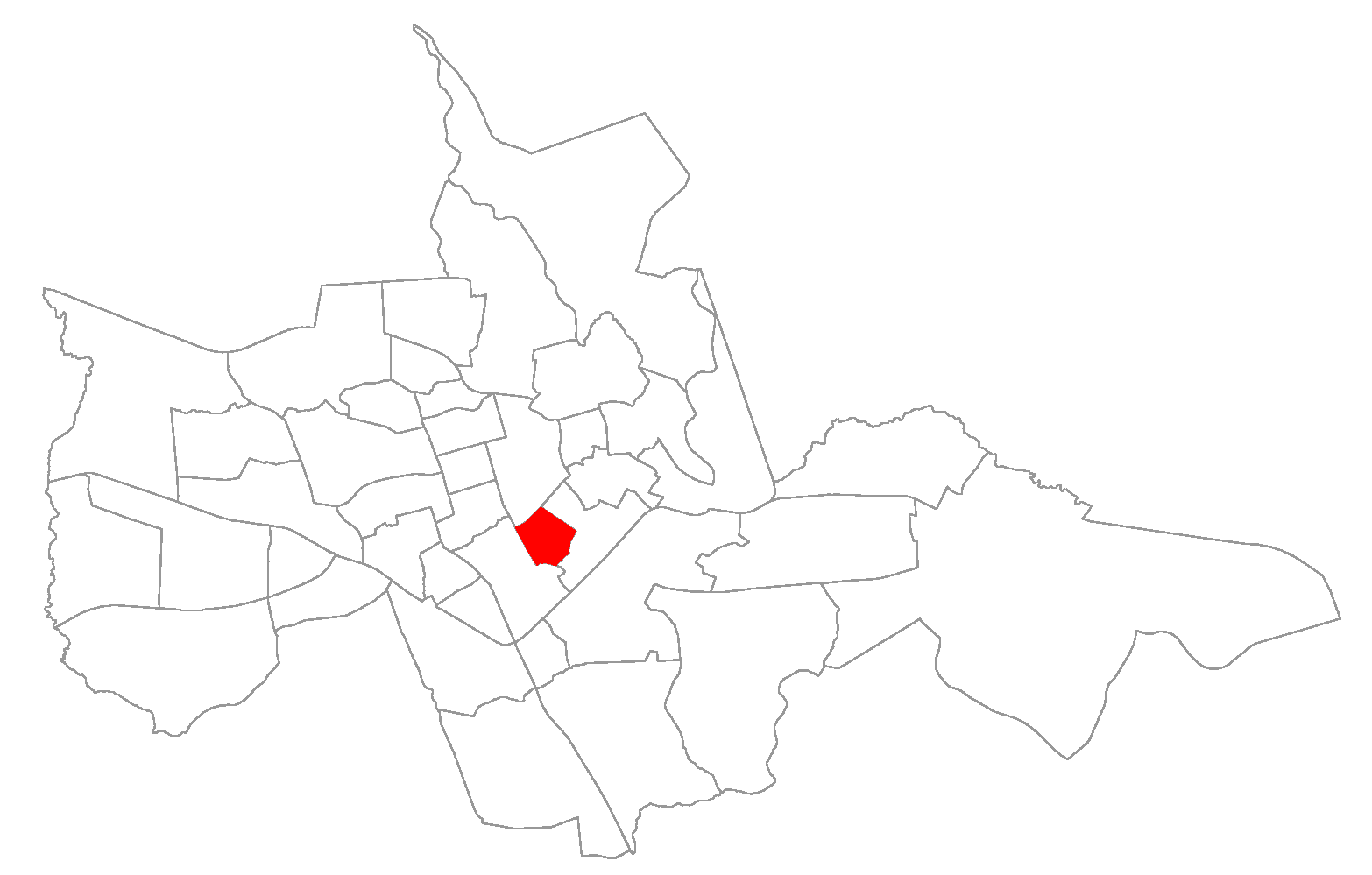
- The bairro in District of Sede

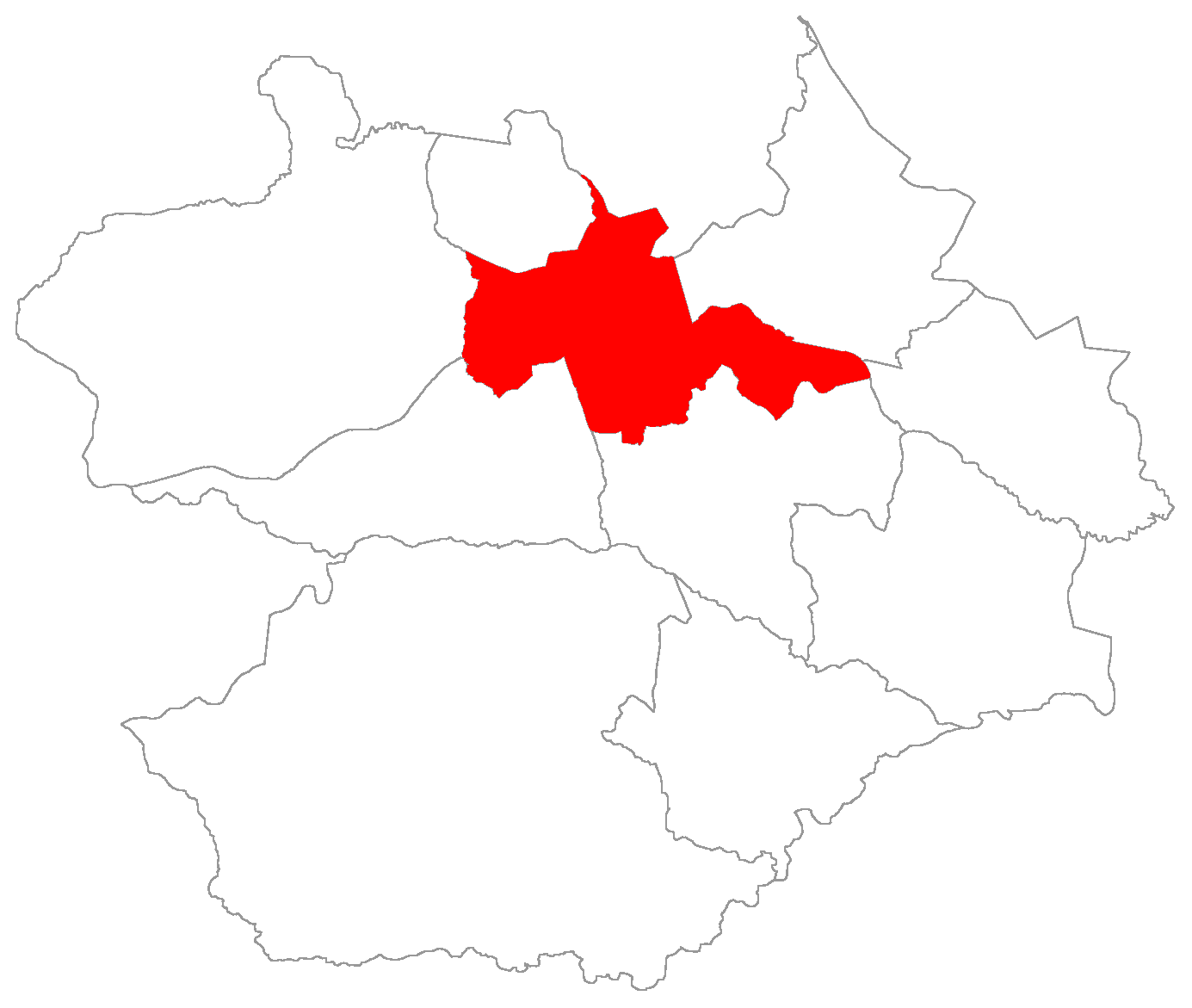
- District of Sede, in Santa Maria City, Rio Grande do Sul, Brazil
- Coordinates: 29°41′58.81″S 53°48′12.46″W
- Country: Brazil
- State: Rio Grande do Sul
- Municipality/City: Santa Maria
- District: District of Sede

Area
  - Total: 0.6009 km^{2} (0.2320 sq mi)

Population
  - Total: 4,168
  - Density: 6,936/km^{2} (17,960/sq mi)
- Postal code: 97.060-040 to 97.060-639
- Adjacent bairros: Centro, Nossa Senhora de Lourdes, Nossa Senhora Medianeira.
- Website: Official site of Santa Maria

Nonoai (Portuguese pronunciation: [????], "João Pereira de Almeida, Baron of Nonoai") is a bairro in the District of Sede in the municipality of Santa Maria, in the Brazilian state of Rio Grande do Sul. It is located in central Santa Maria.

== Villages ==
The bairro contains the following villages: Conjunto Residencial João Rolim, Nonoai, Parque Residencial Jardim Tamanday, Parque Residencial Panorama, Vila Nonoai.
