= Itararé, Santa Maria =

Itararé
- Bairro
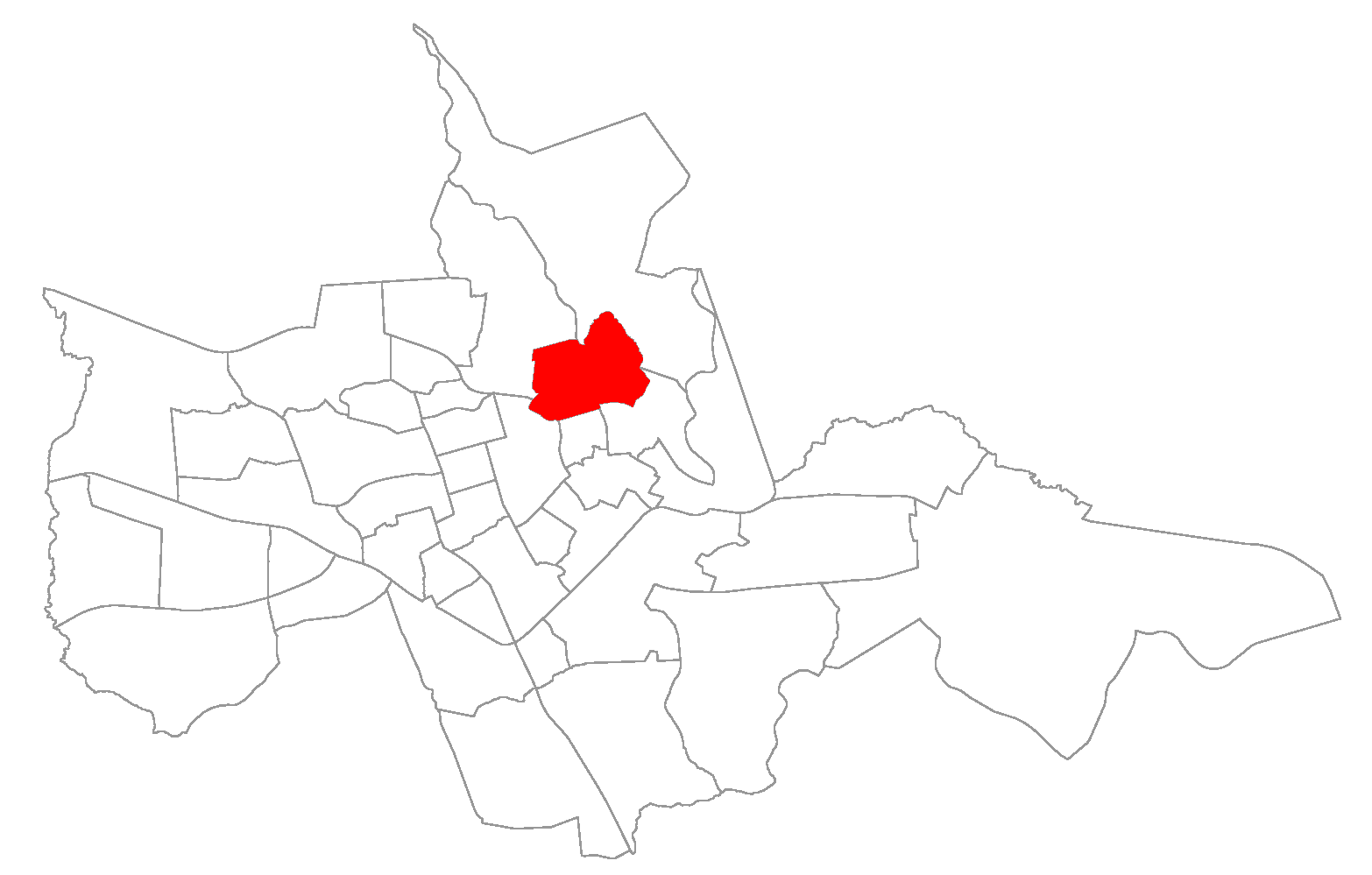
- The bairro in District of Sede

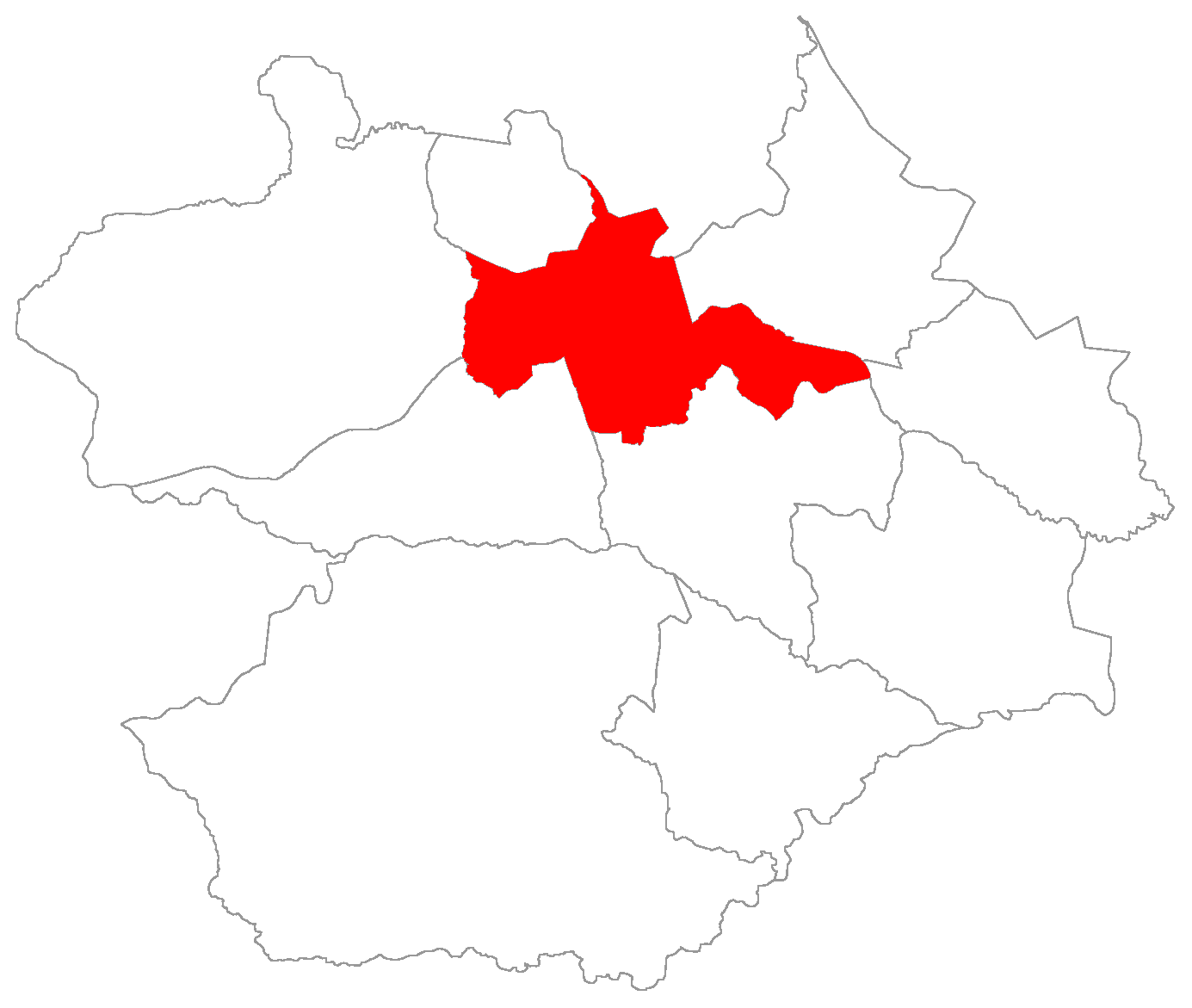
- District of Sede, in Santa Maria City, Rio Grande do Sul, Brazil
- Coordinates: 29°40′27.66″S 53°47′45.92″W
- Country: Brazil
- State: Rio Grande do Sul
- Municipality/City: Santa Maria
- District: District of Sede

Area
  - Total: 2.3133 km^{2} (0.8932 sq mi)

Population
  - Total: 7,300
  - Density: 3,200/km^{2} (8,200/sq mi)
- Postal code: 97.045-000 to 97.090-719
- Adjacent bairros: Campestre do Menino Deus, Centro, Menino Jesus, Nossa Senhora do Perpétuo Socorro, Presidente João Goulart.
- Website: Official site of Santa Maria

Itararé (Portuguese pronunciation: [????], "indian word for excavated stone") is a bairro in the District of Sede in the municipality of Santa Maria, in the Brazilian state of Rio Grande do Sul. It is located in northeast Santa Maria.

== Villages ==
The bairro contains the following villages: Canário, Itararé, Loteamento Link, Possadas, Vila Bela Vista, Vila Bürger, Vila Felipe Menna Barreto, Vila Kruel, Vila Montanha Russa, Vila Nossa Senhora Aparecida, Vila Pércio Reis, Vila Popular Leste, Vila Popular Oeste.

== Gallery of photos ==
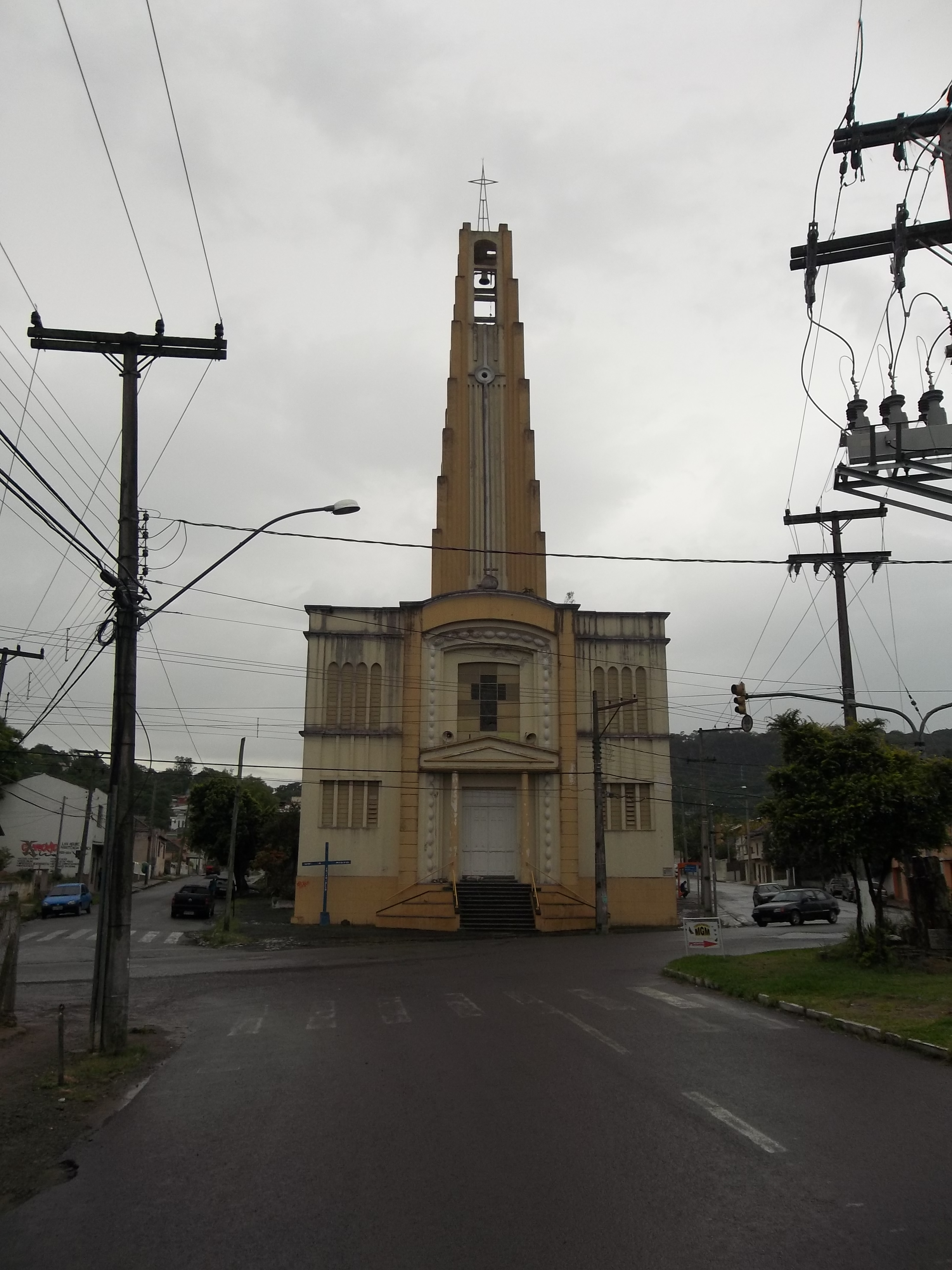

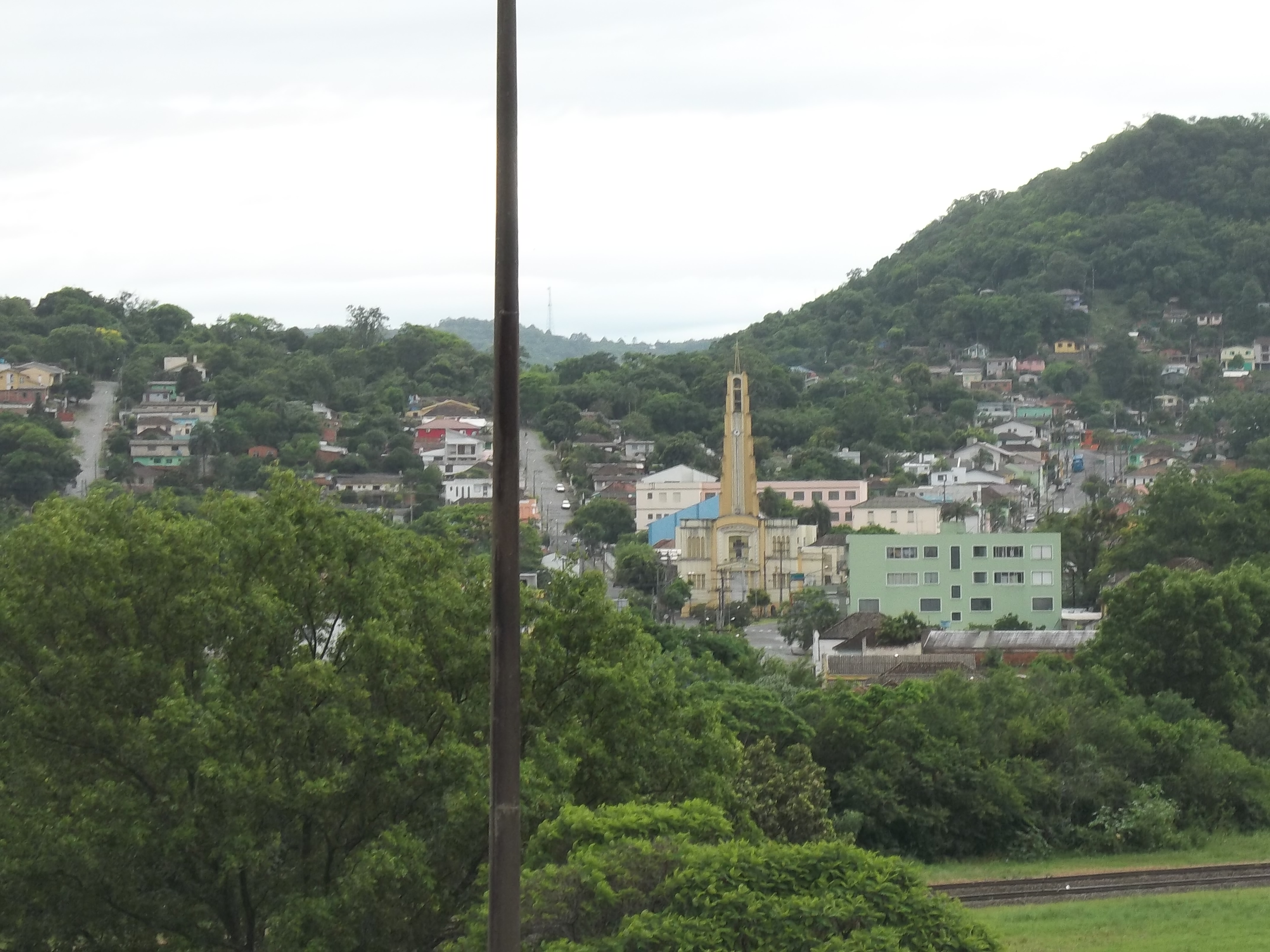

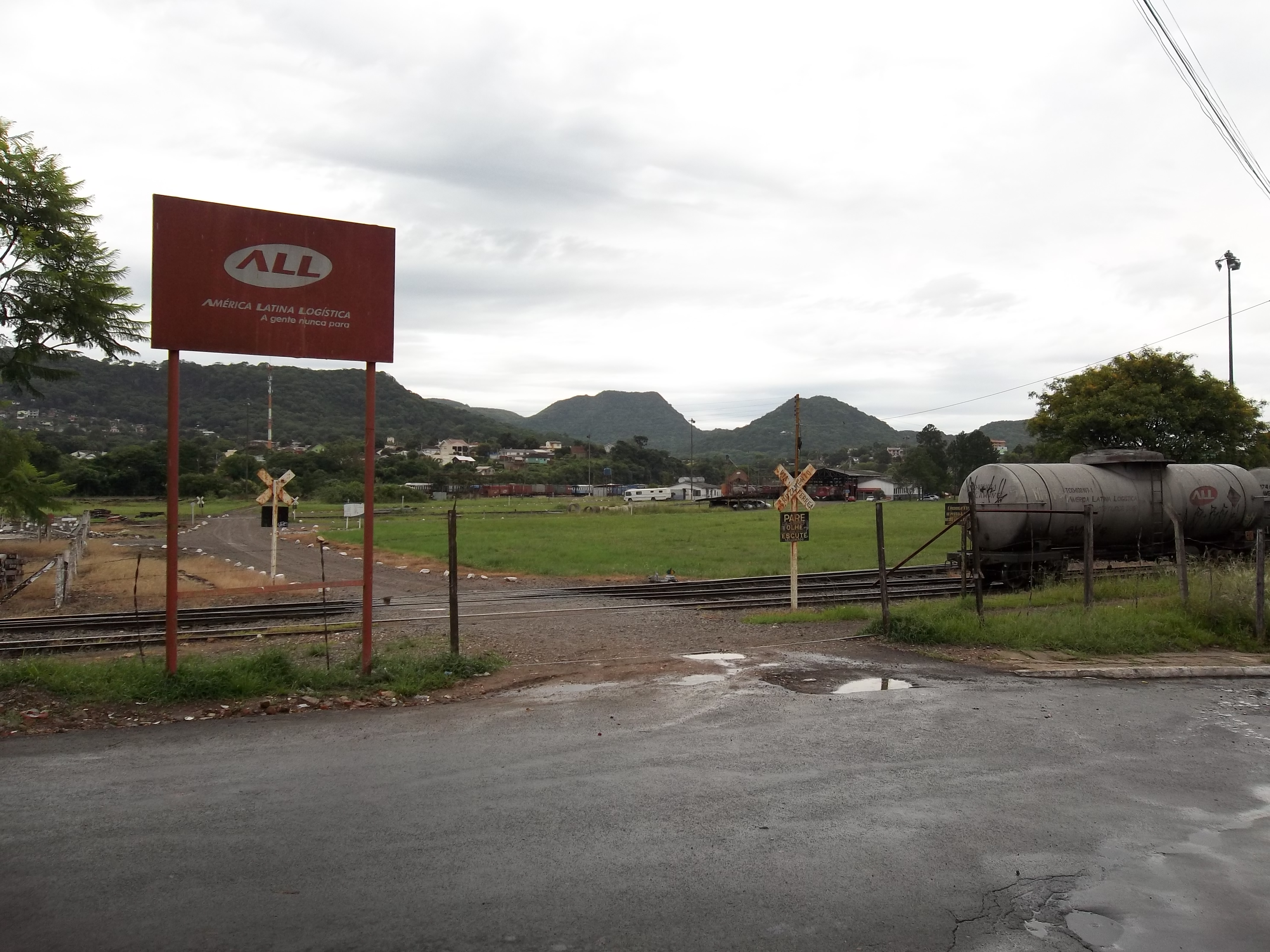
