= Nossa Senhora de Lourdes, Santa Maria =

Nossa Senhora de Lourdes
- Bairro
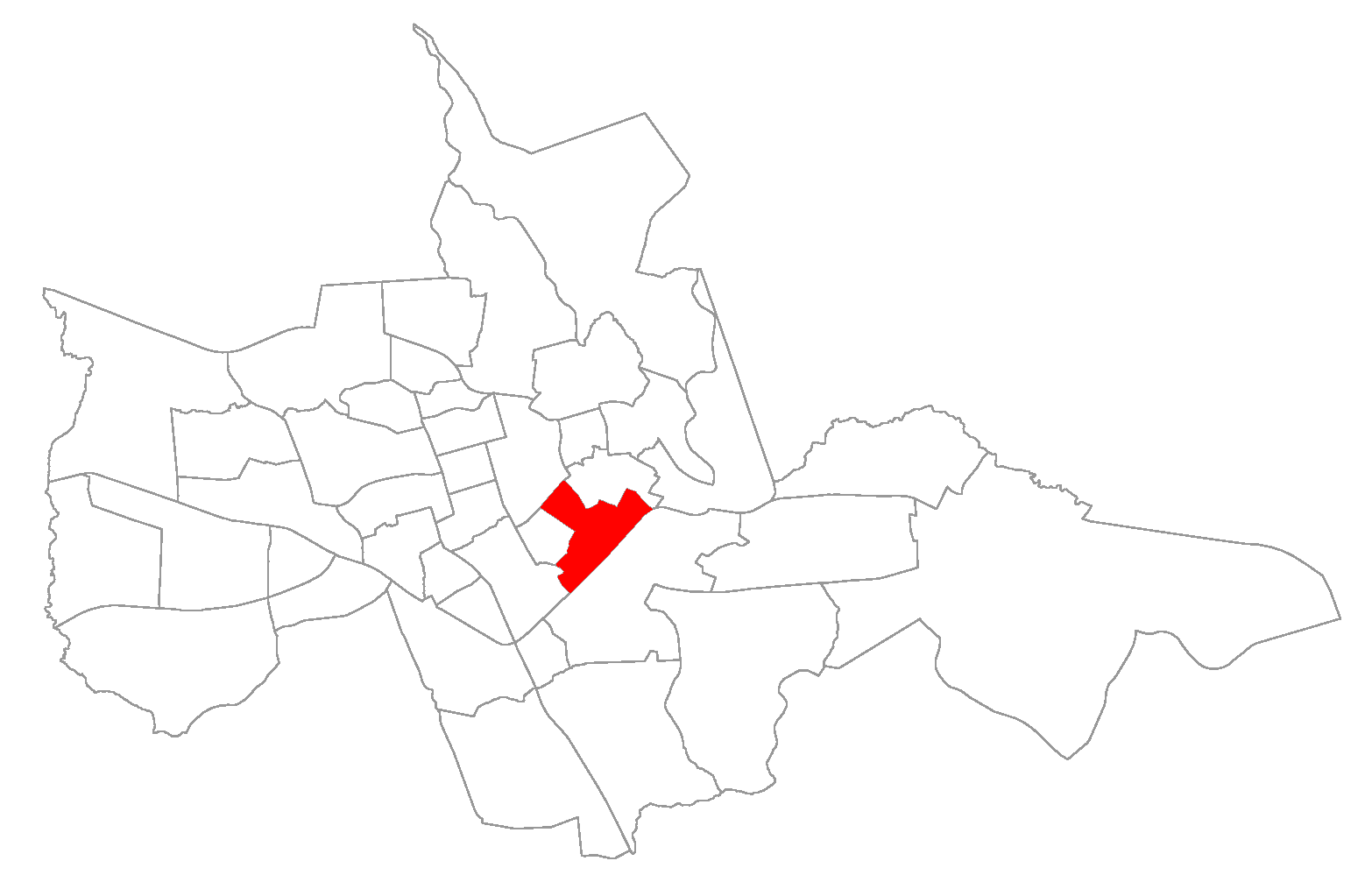
- The bairro in District of Sede

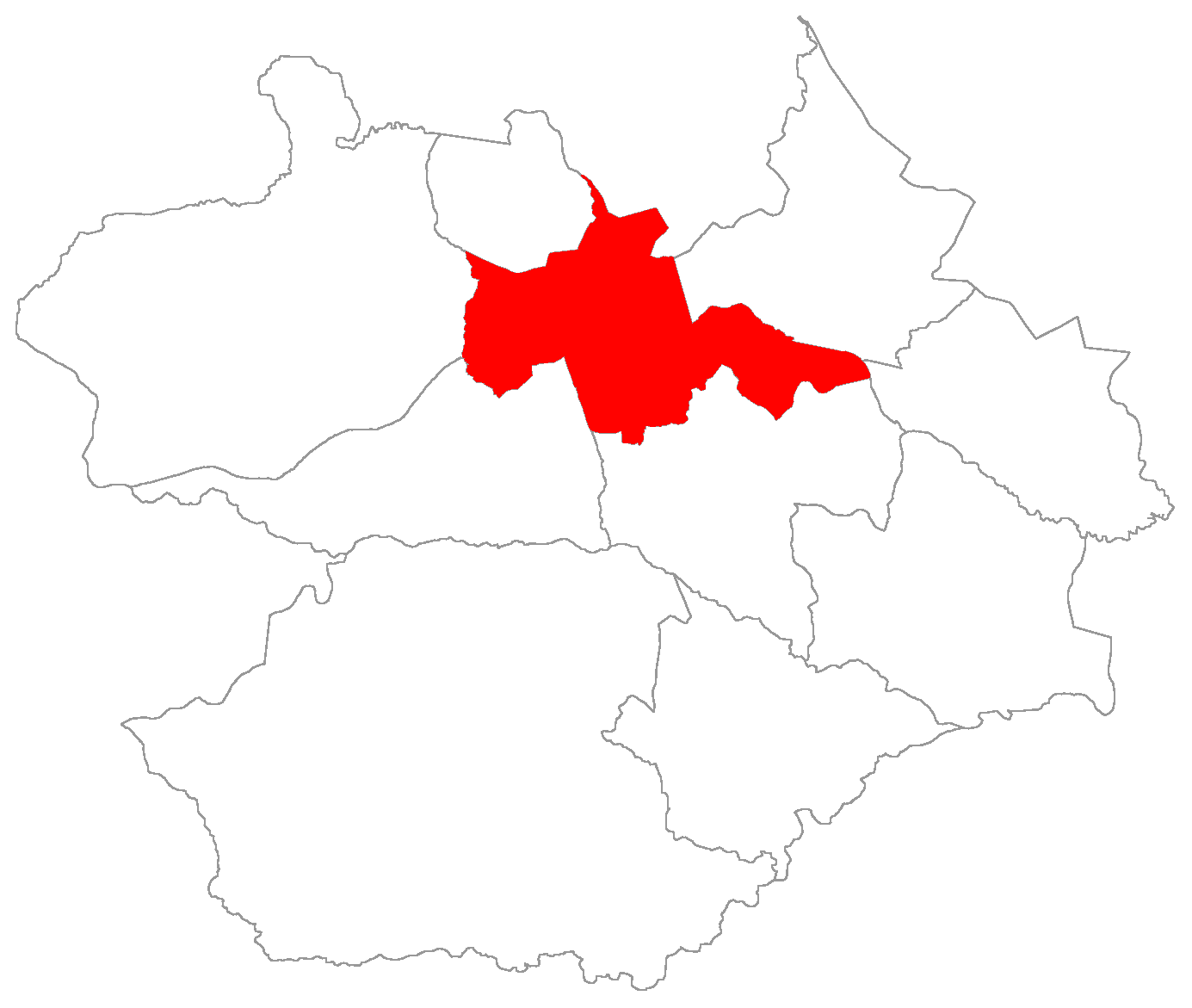
- District of Sede, in Santa Maria City, Rio Grande do Sul, Brazil
- Coordinates: 29°41′50.42″S 53°47′46.71″W
- Country: Brazil
- State: Rio Grande do Sul
- Municipality/City: Santa Maria
- District: District of Sede

Area
  - Total: 1.4652 km^{2} (0.5657 sq mi)

Population
  - Total: 5,993
  - Density: 4,090/km^{2} (10,590/sq mi)
- Postal code: 97.050-090 to 97.060-807
- Adjacent bairros: Centro, Cerrito, Nonoai, Nossa Senhora das Dores, Nossa Senhora Medianeira.
- Website: Official site of Santa Maria

Nossa Senhora de Lourdes ("Our Lady of Lourdes") is a bairro in the District of Sede in the municipality of Santa Maria, in the Brazilian state of Rio Grande do Sul. It is located in central Santa Maria.

== Villages ==
The bairro contains the following villages: Loteamento Cidade Jardim, Nossa Senhora de Lourdes, Parque Residencial Nossa Senhora da Saúde, Parque Residencial Nossa Senhora de Lourdes, Vila Ana Maria, Vila Belém, Vila Elwanger, Vila Palotina, Vila Rolim.

== Gallery of photos ==
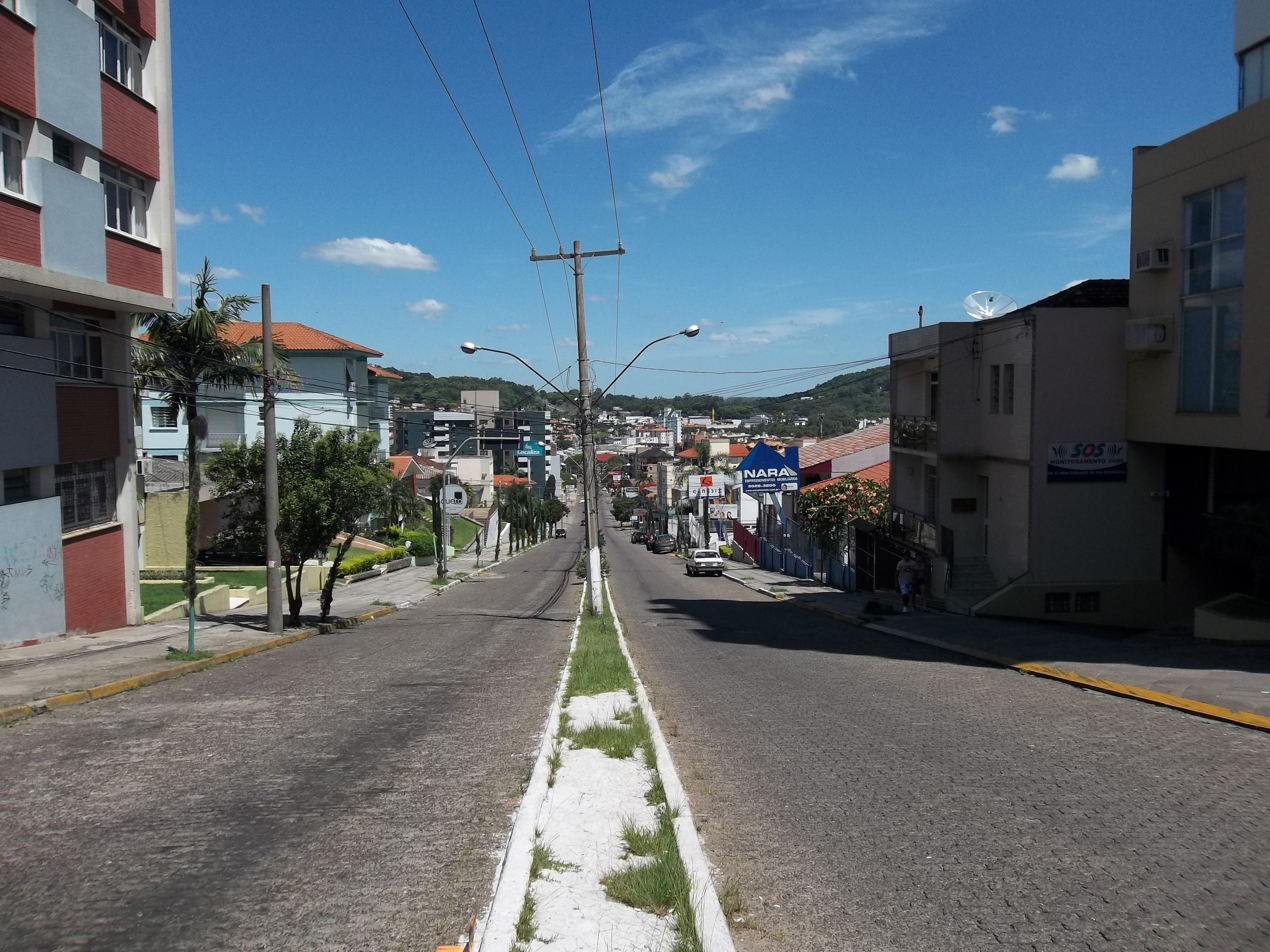

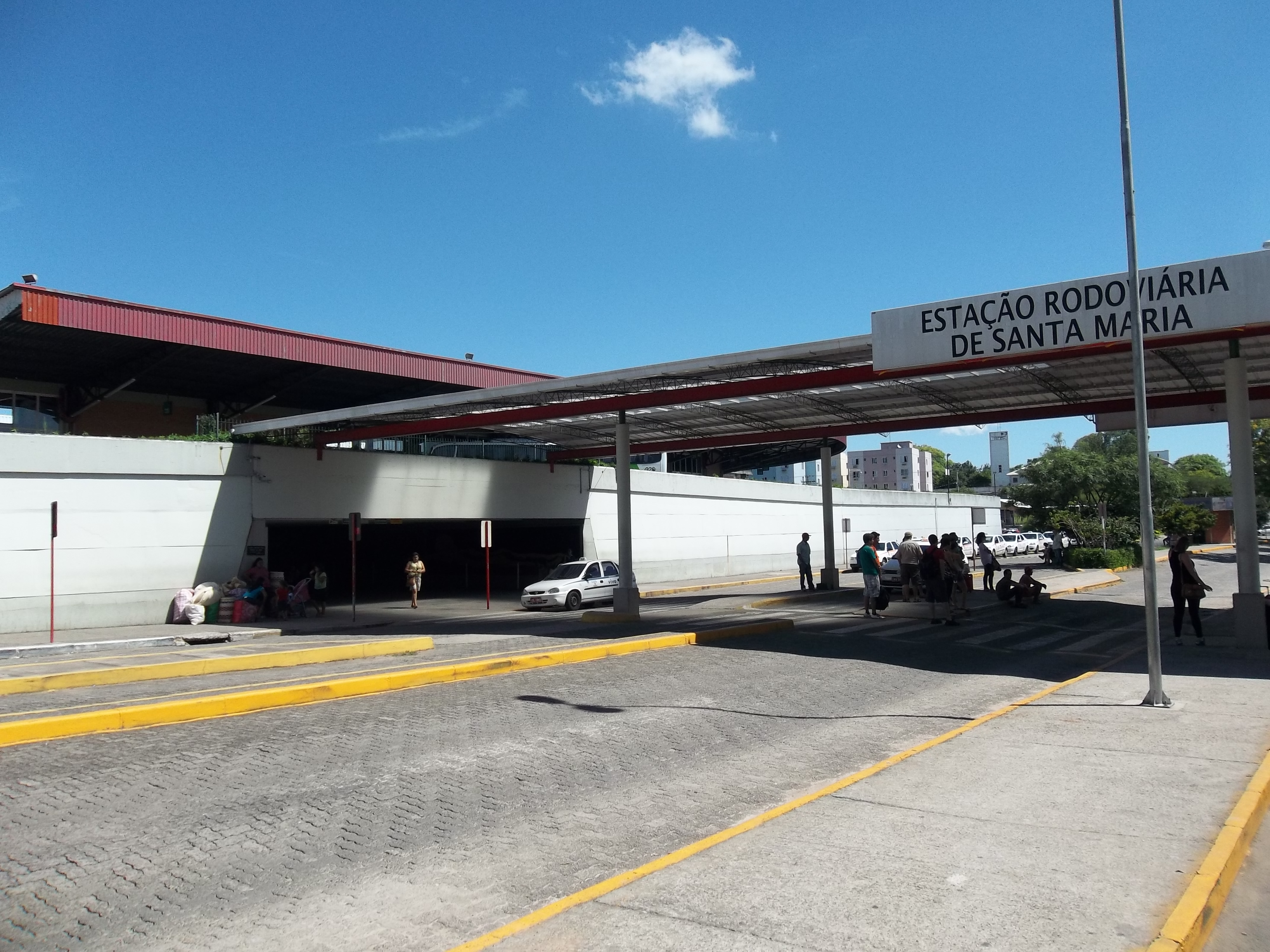
