= Menino Jesus =

- Bairro
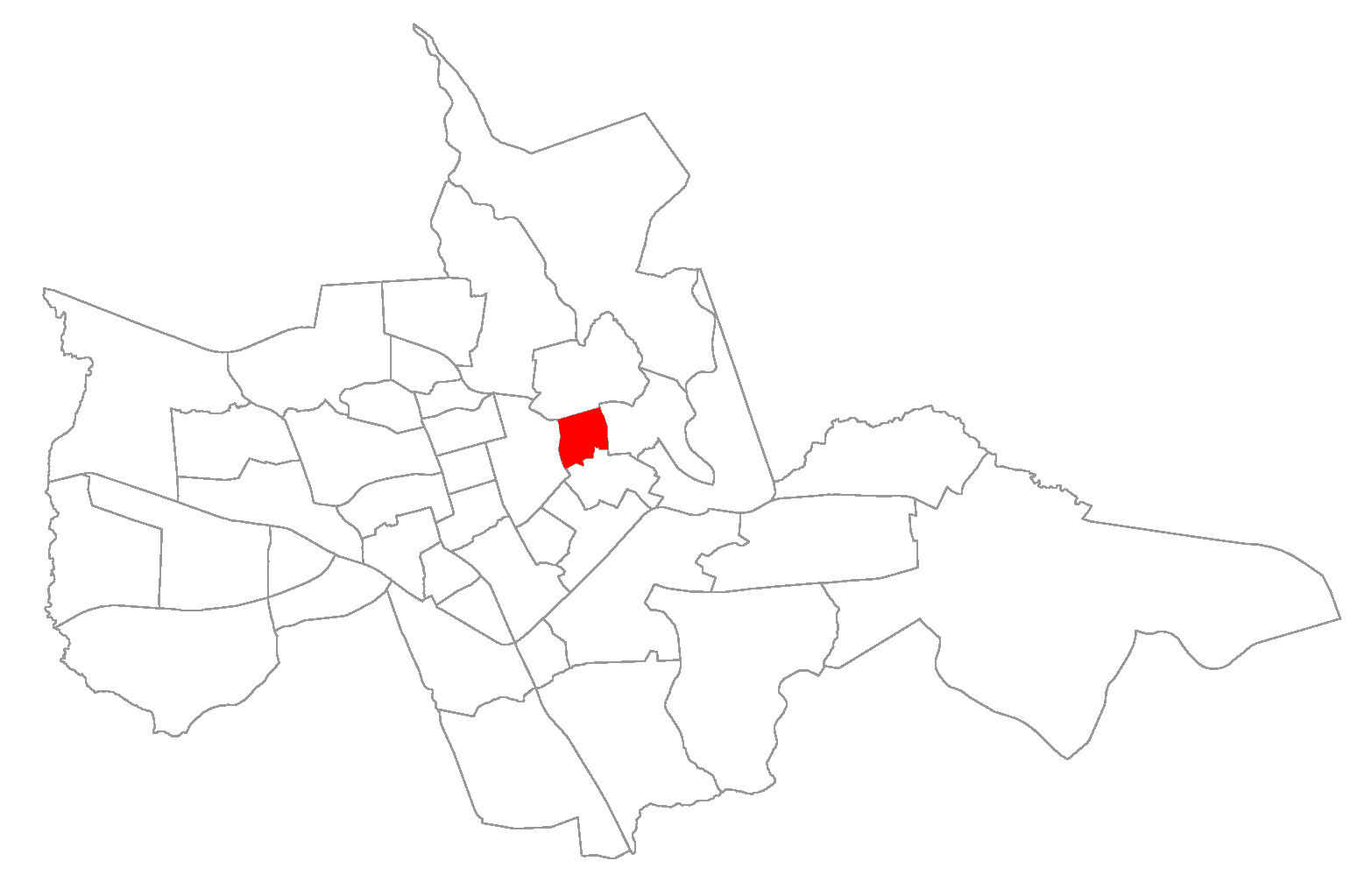
- The bairro in District of Sede

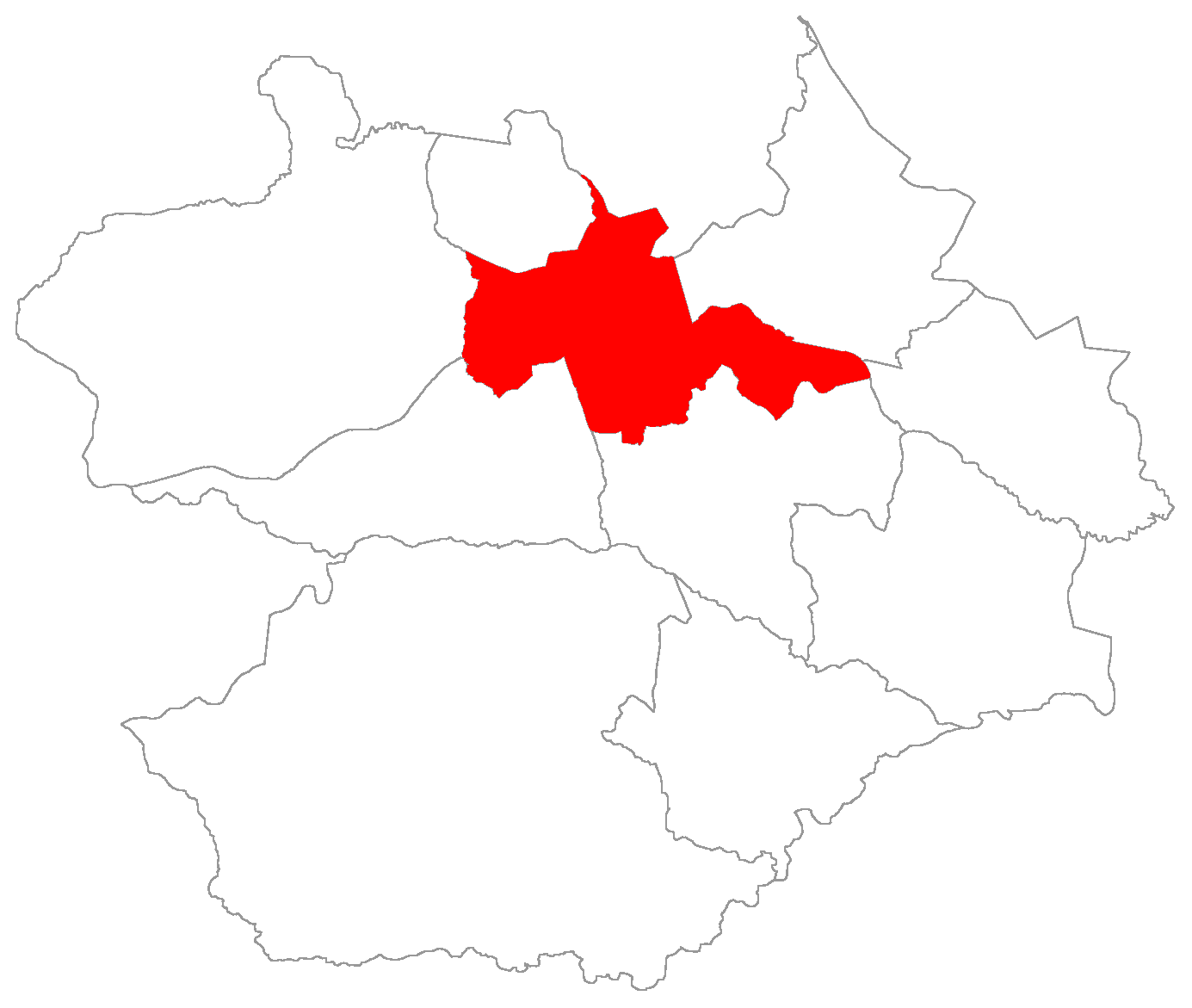
- District of Sede, in Santa Maria City, Rio Grande do Sul, Brazil
- Coordinates: 29°41′03.46″S 53°47′47.01″W
- Country: Brazil
- State: Rio Grande do Sul
- Municipality/City: Santa Maria
- District: District of Sede

Area
  - Total: 0.5892 km^{2} (0.2275 sq mi)

Population
  - Total: 5,410
  - Density: 9,180/km^{2} (23,800/sq mi)
- Postal code: 97.050-022 to 97.050-789
- Adjacent bairros: Centro, Itararé, Nossa Senhora das Dores, Presidente João Goulart.
- Website: Official site of Santa Maria

Menino Jesus ("child Jesus") is a bairro in the District of Sede in the municipality of Santa Maria, in the Brazilian state of Rio Grande do Sul. It is located in northeast Santa Maria.

== Villages ==
The bairro contains the following villages: Menino Jesus, Vila Leste, Vila Major Duarte, Vila Ponte Seca.

== Gallery of photos ==
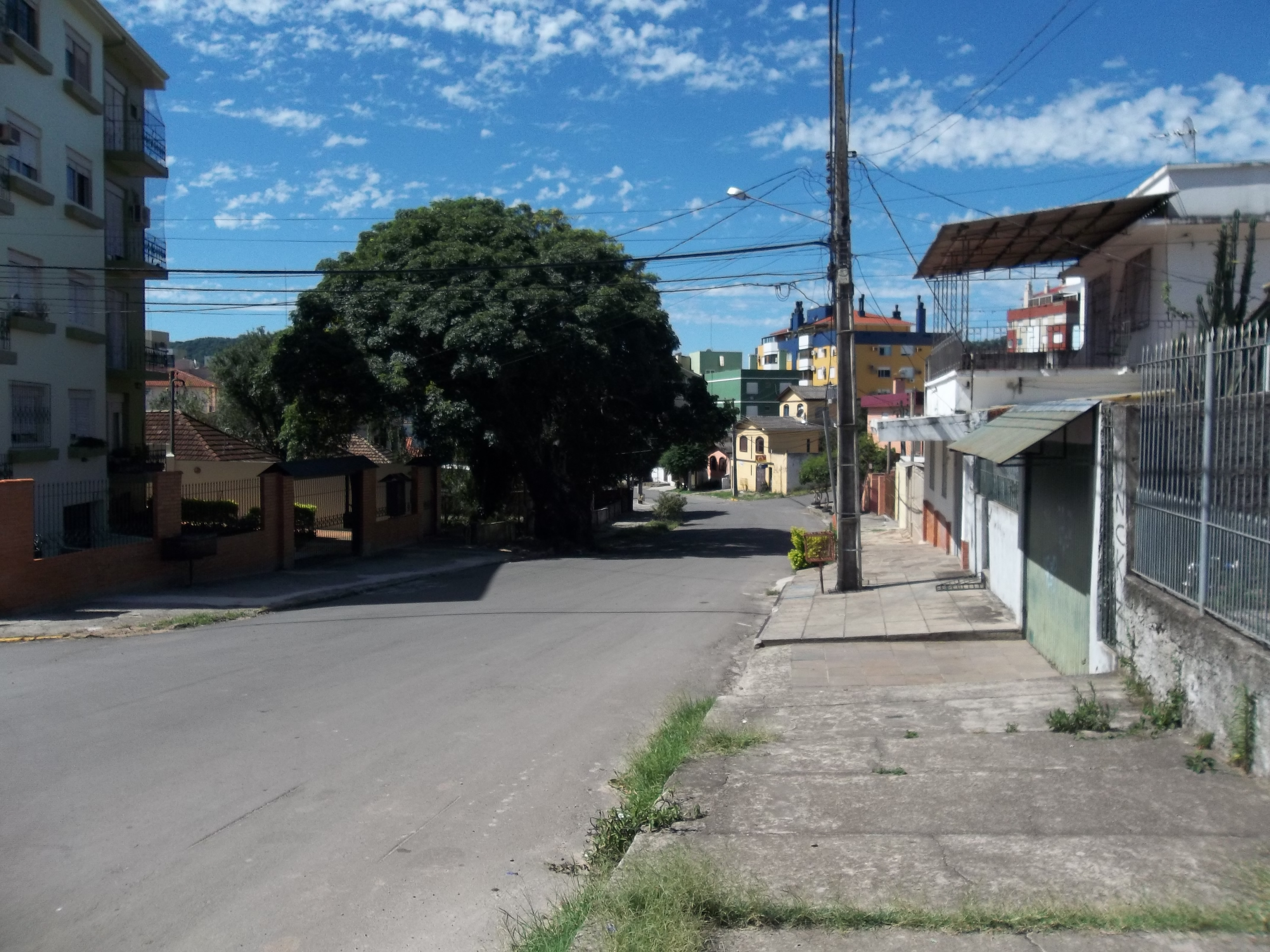
