= Centro, Santa Maria =

Centro Downtown
- Bairro
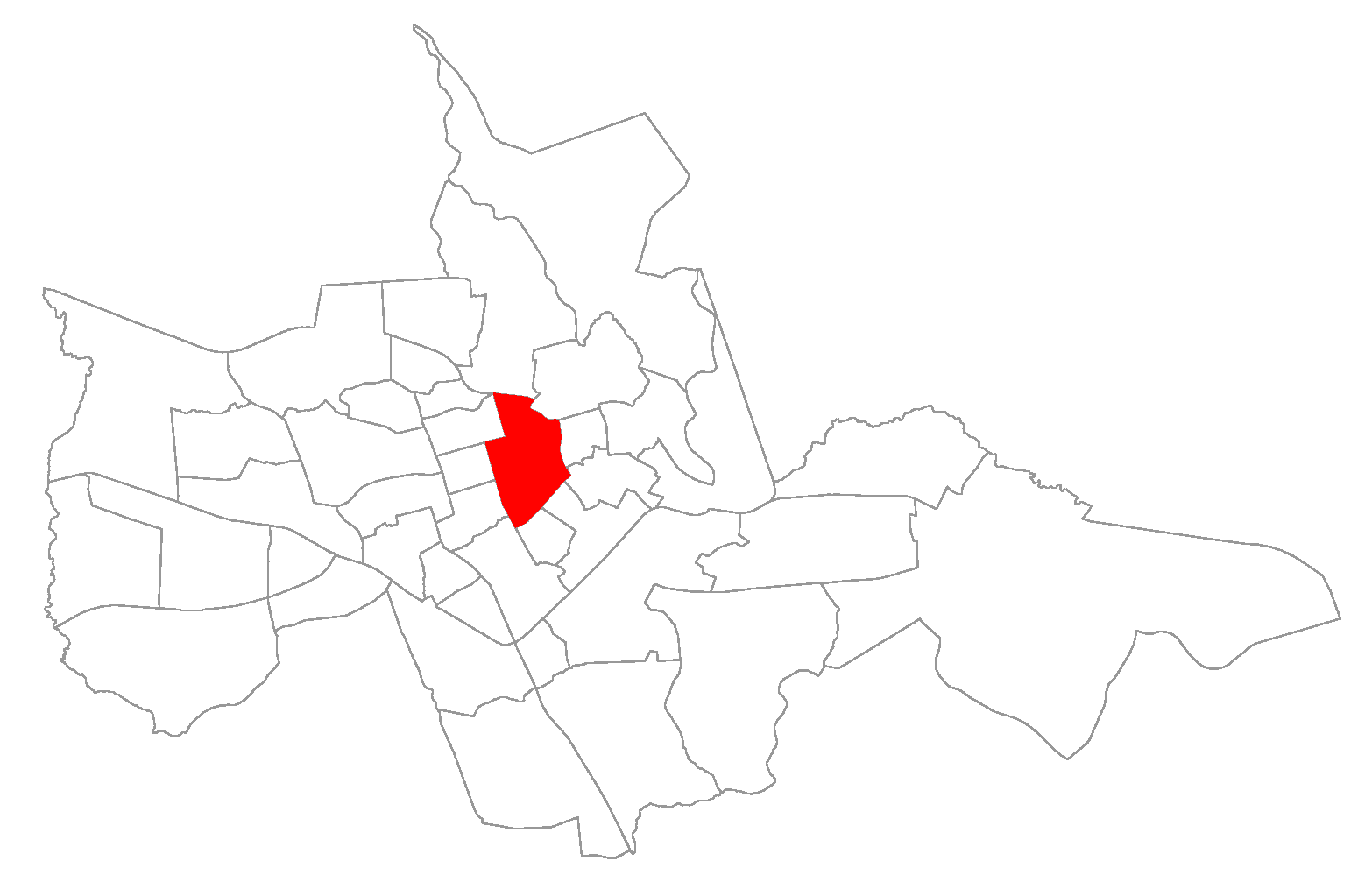
- The bairro in District of Sede

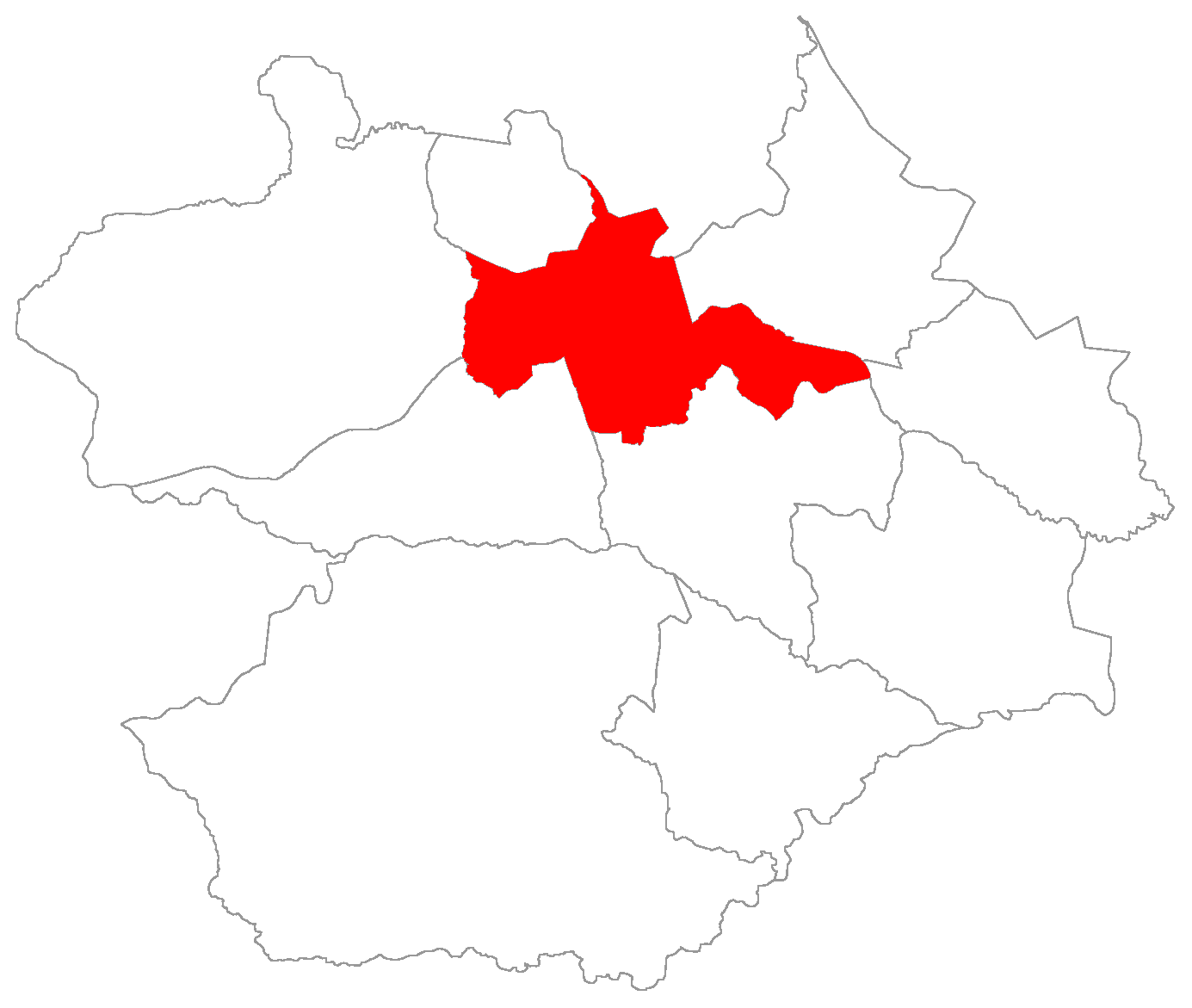
- District of Sede, in Santa Maria City, Rio Grande do Sul, Brazil
- Coordinates: 29°41′11.22″S 53°48′21.78″W
- Country: Brazil
- State: Rio Grande do Sul
- Municipality/City: Santa Maria
- District: District of Sede

Area
  - Total: 1.9488 km^{2} (0.7524 sq mi)

Population
  - Total: 17,847
  - Density: 9,157.9/km^{2} (23,719/sq mi)
- Postal code: 97.130-000
- Adjacent bairros: Nossa Senhora do Perpétuo Socorro, Itararé, Menino Jesus, Nossa Senhora das Dores, Nonoai, Nossa Senhora de Lourdes, Nossa Senhora Medianeira, Bonfim, Nossa Senhora de Fátima, Nossa Senhora do Rosário
- Website: Official site of Santa Maria

Centro ("downtown") is a bairro in the District of Sede in the municipality of Santa Maria, in the Brazilian state of Rio Grande do Sul. It is the economical heart of Santa Maria.

== Villages ==
The bairro contains the following villages: Astrogildo de Azevedo A, Astrogildo de Azevedo B, Centro, Parque Centenário, Parque Itaimbé, Rizzato Irmãos, Vila Belga, Vila Crispim Pereira, Vila Felipe de Oliveira, Vila José Azenha, Vila José Moraes, Vila Major Duarte, Vila Zulmira.;

== Gallery of photos ==
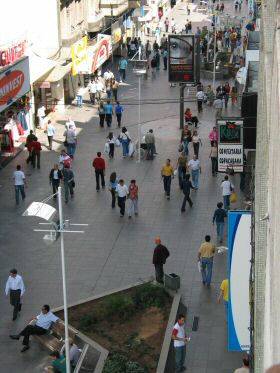

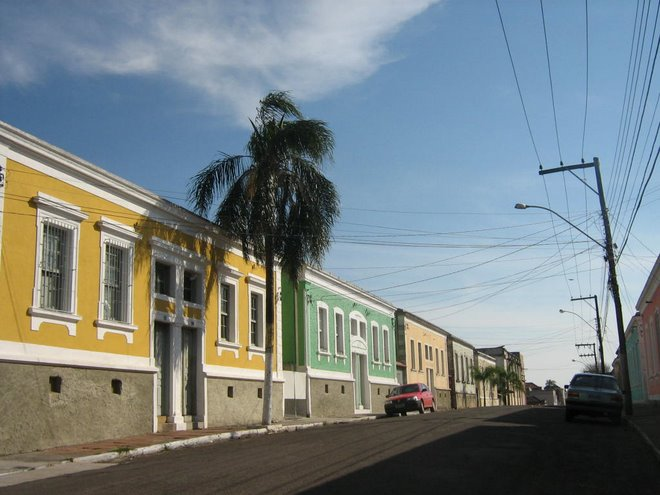

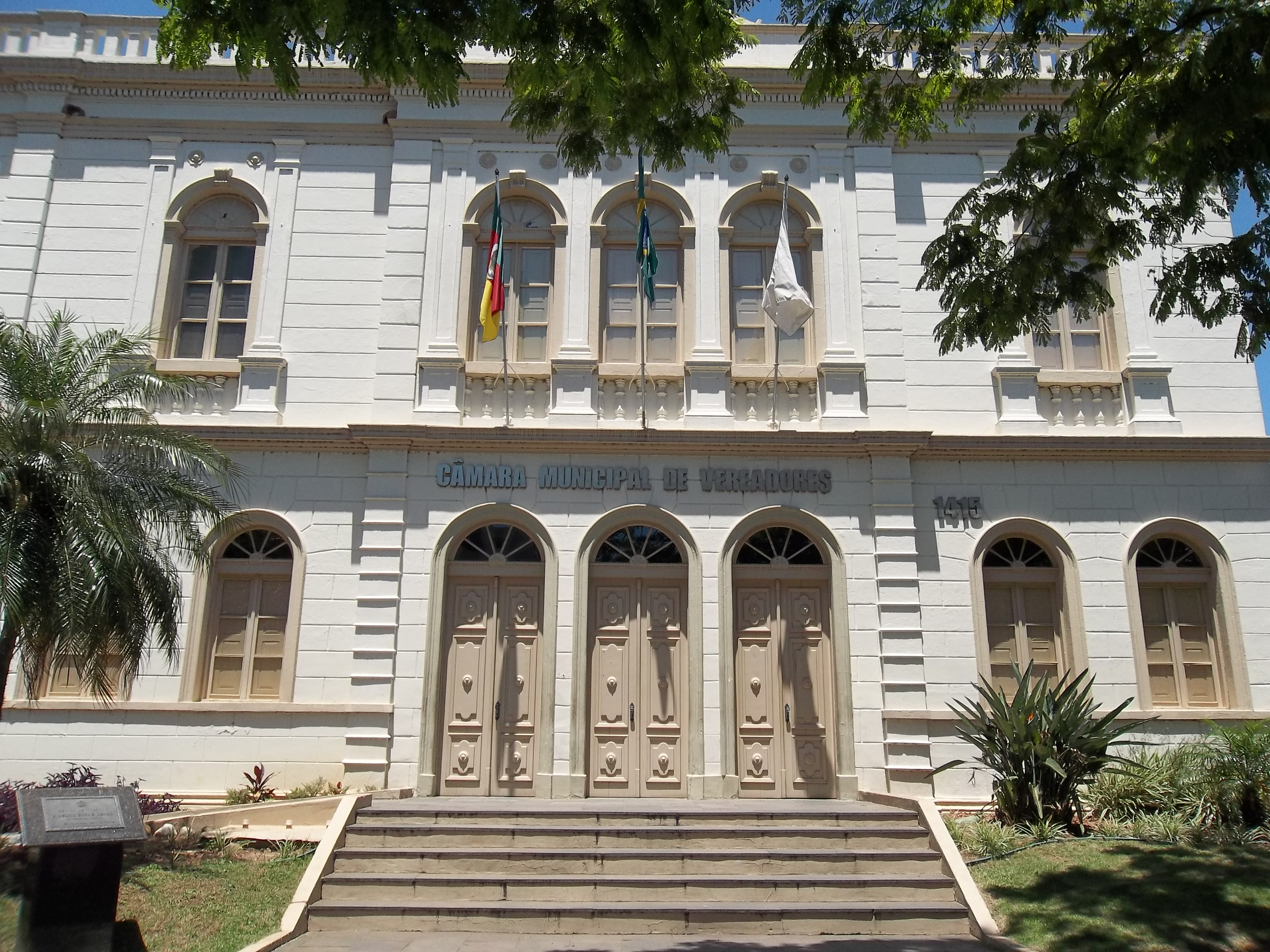

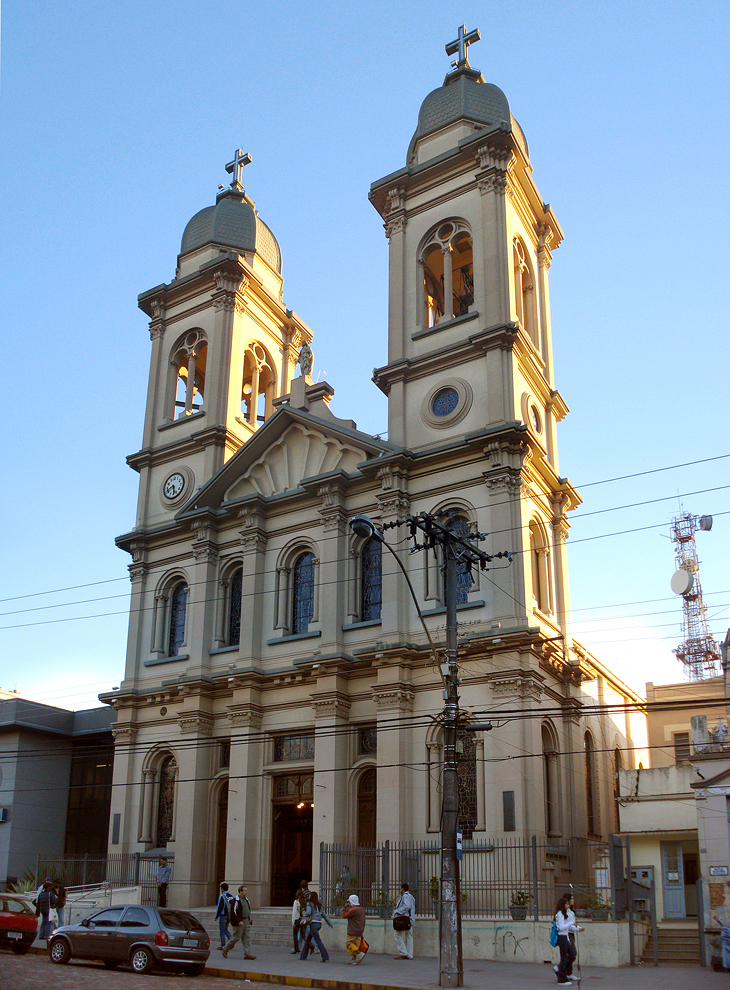

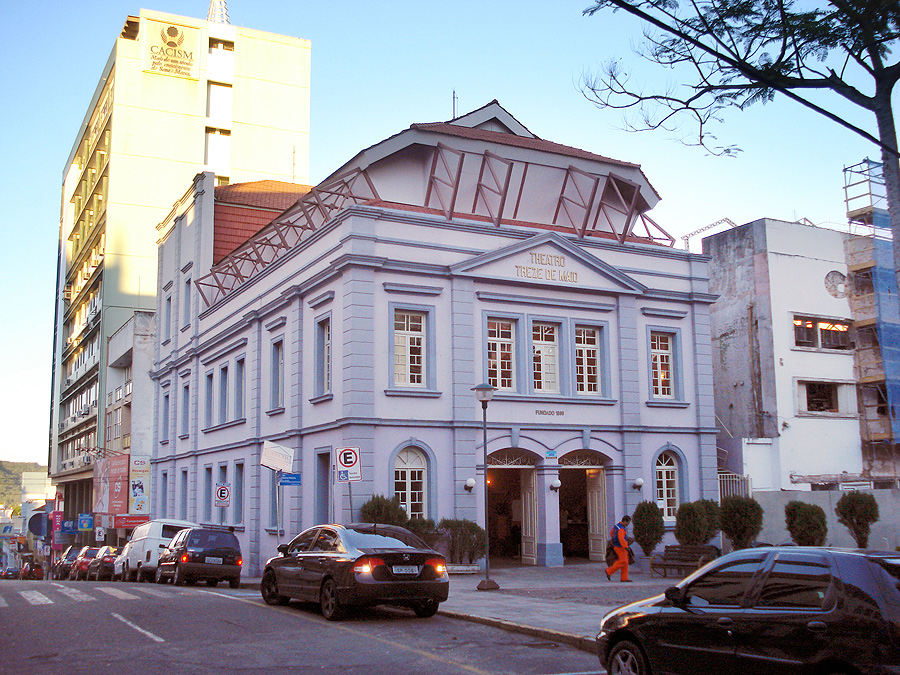

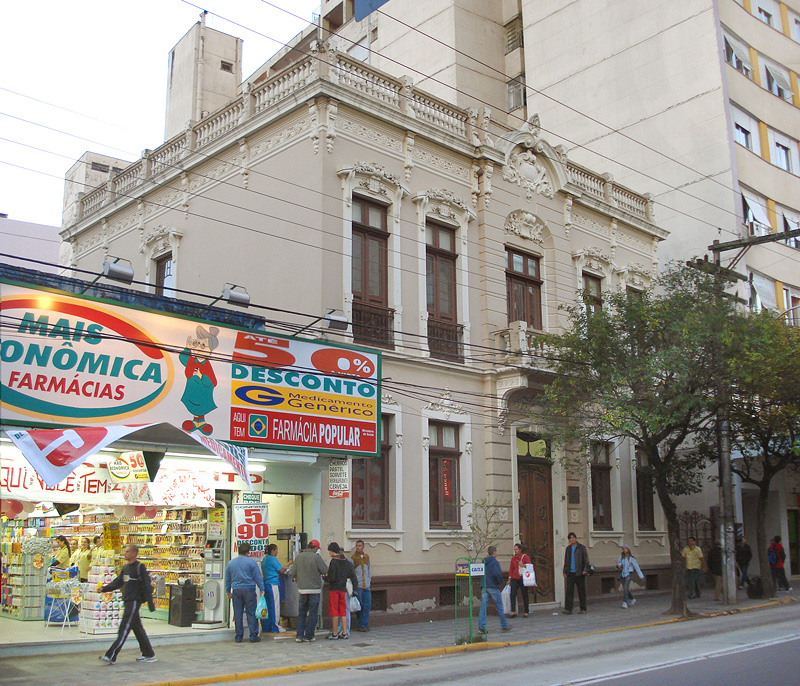

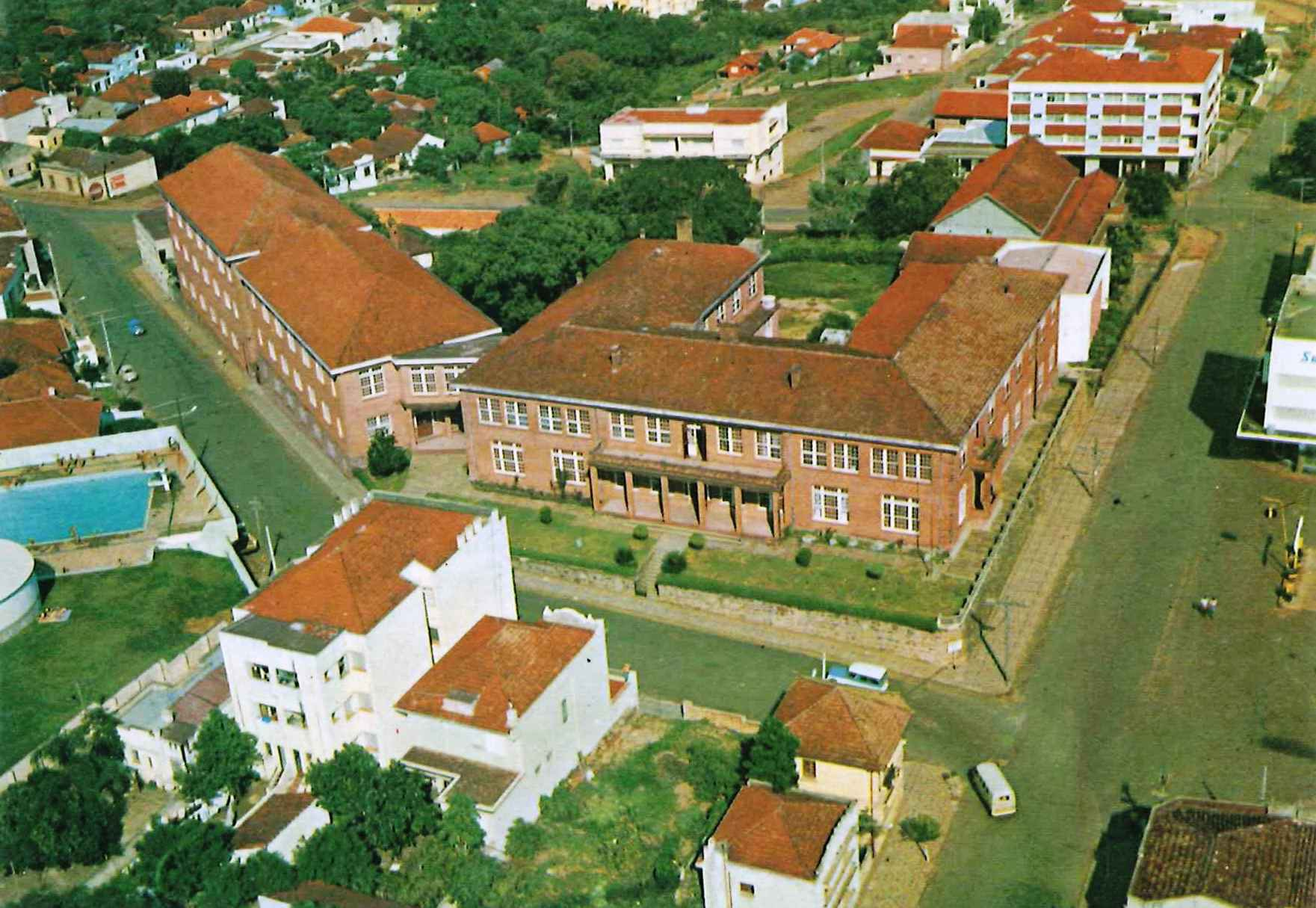

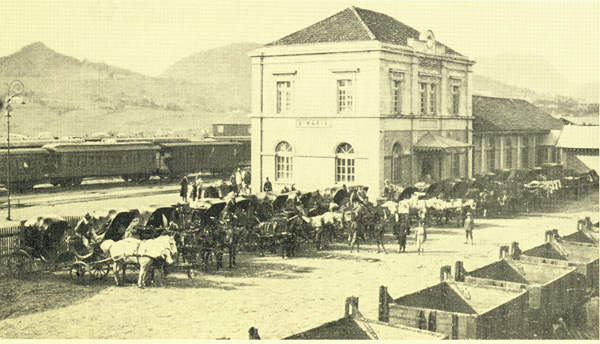

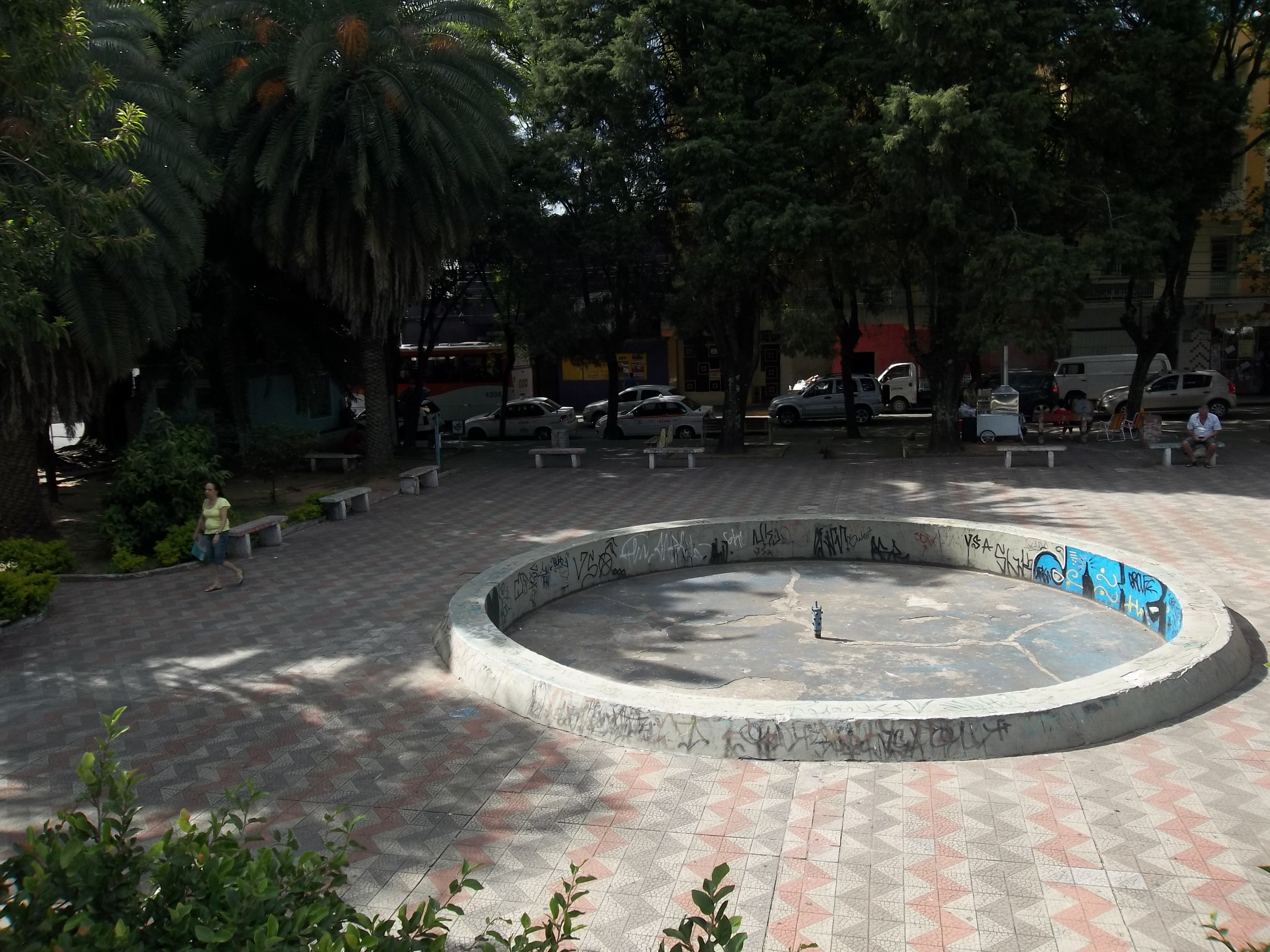
