= Presidente João Goulart =

- Bairro
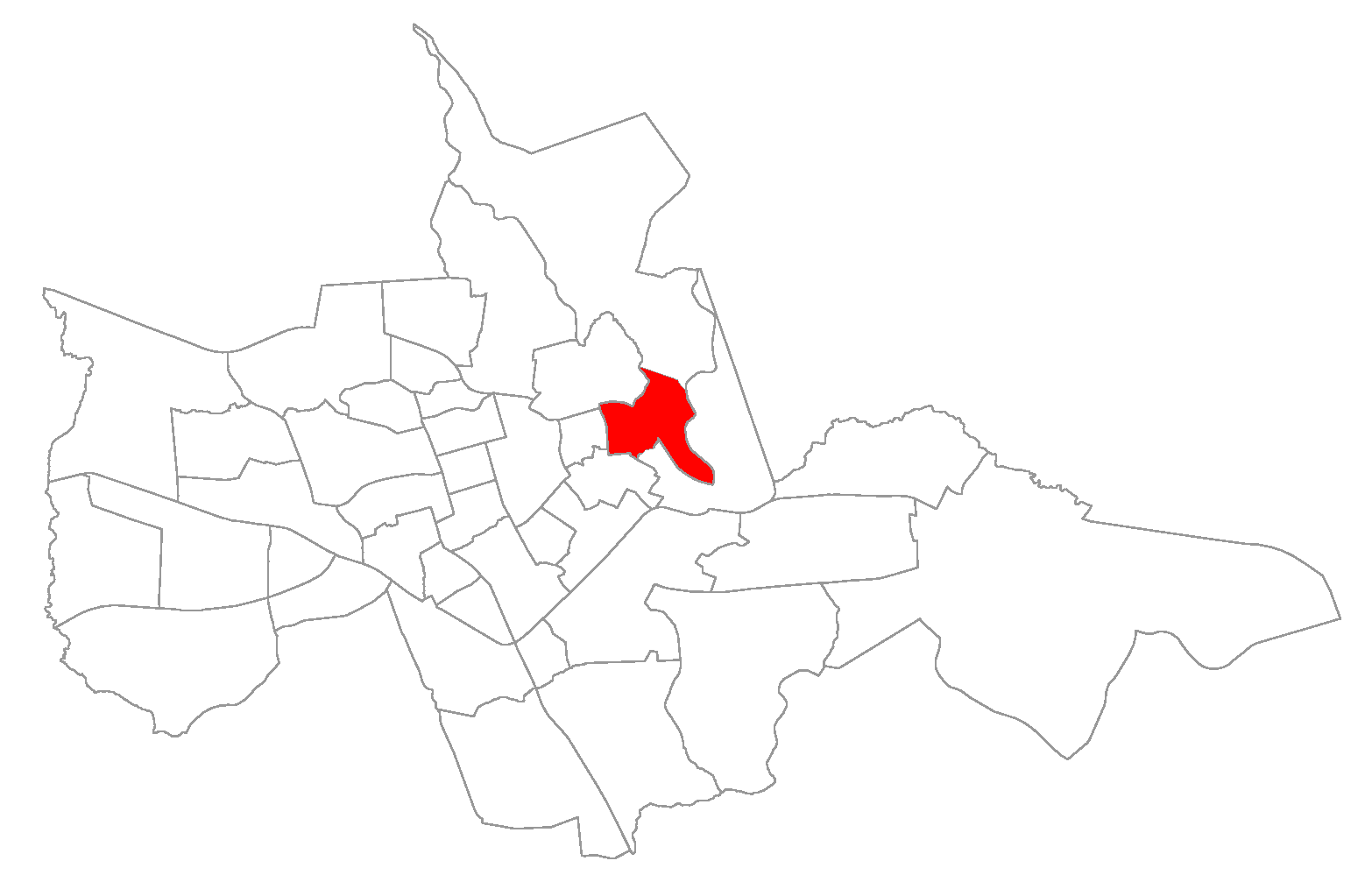
- The bairro in District of Sede

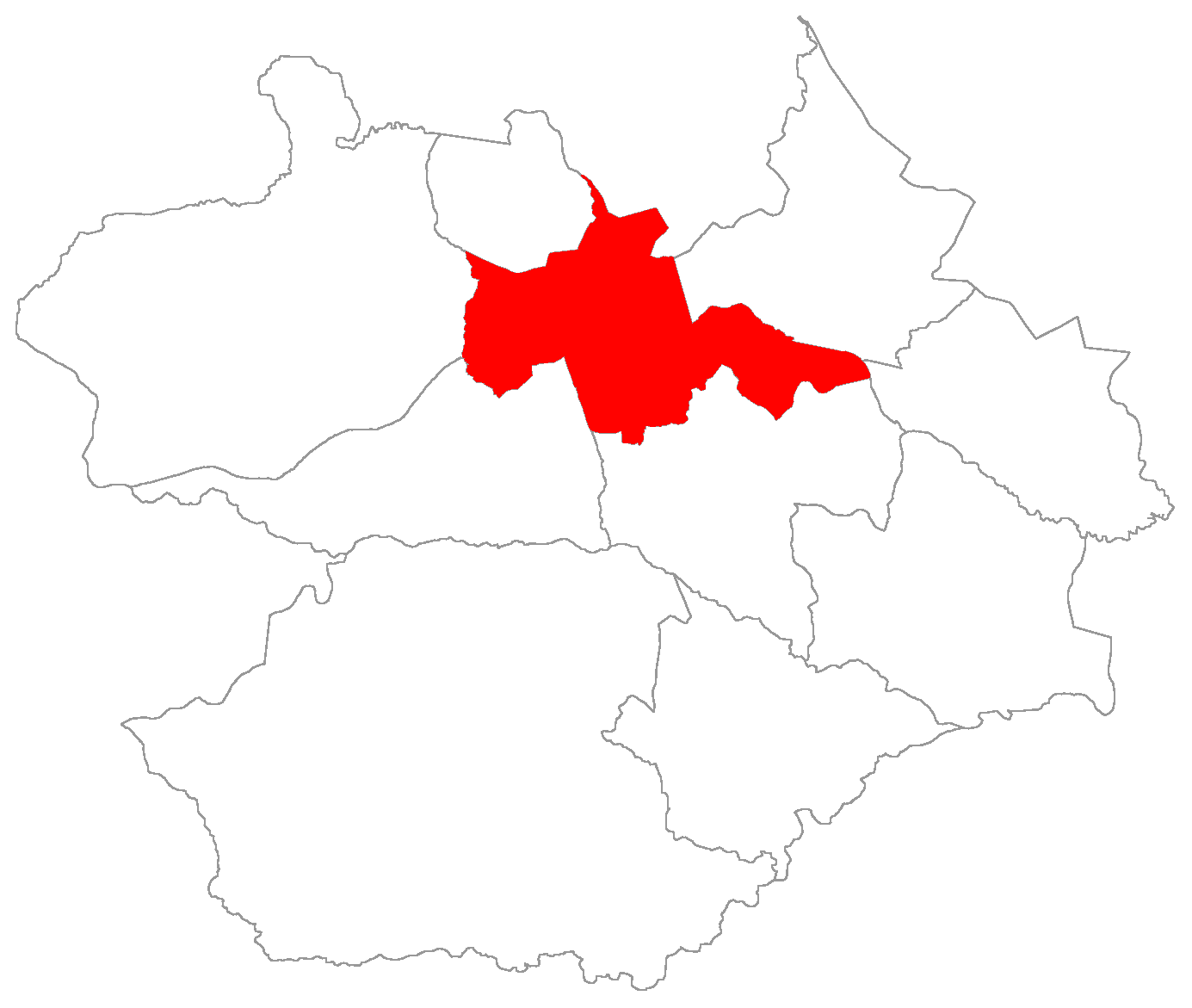
- District of Sede, in Santa Maria City, Rio Grande do Sul, Brazil
- Coordinates: 29°40′59.12″S 53°47′03.21″W
- Country: Brazil
- State: Rio Grande do Sul
- Municipality/City: Santa Maria
- District: District of Sede

Area
  - Total: 1.7471 km^{2} (0.6746 sq mi)

Population
  - Total: 6,252
  - Density: 3,579/km^{2} (9,268/sq mi)
- Postal code: 97.090-000 to 97.090-689
- Adjacent bairros: Campestre do Menino Deus, Itararé, Km 3, Menino Jesus, Nossa Senhora das Dores.
- Website: Official site of Santa Maria

Presidente João Goulart ("president João Goulart - Brazilian president") is a bairro in the District of Sede in the municipality of Santa Maria, in the Brazilian state of Rio Grande do Sul. It is located in northeast Santa Maria.

== Villages ==
The bairro contains the following villages: João Goulart, Vila Fredolina, Vila Nova, Vila Operária, Vila Schirmer.
