= Nossa Senhora das Dores, Santa Maria =

Nossa Senhora das Dores
- Bairro
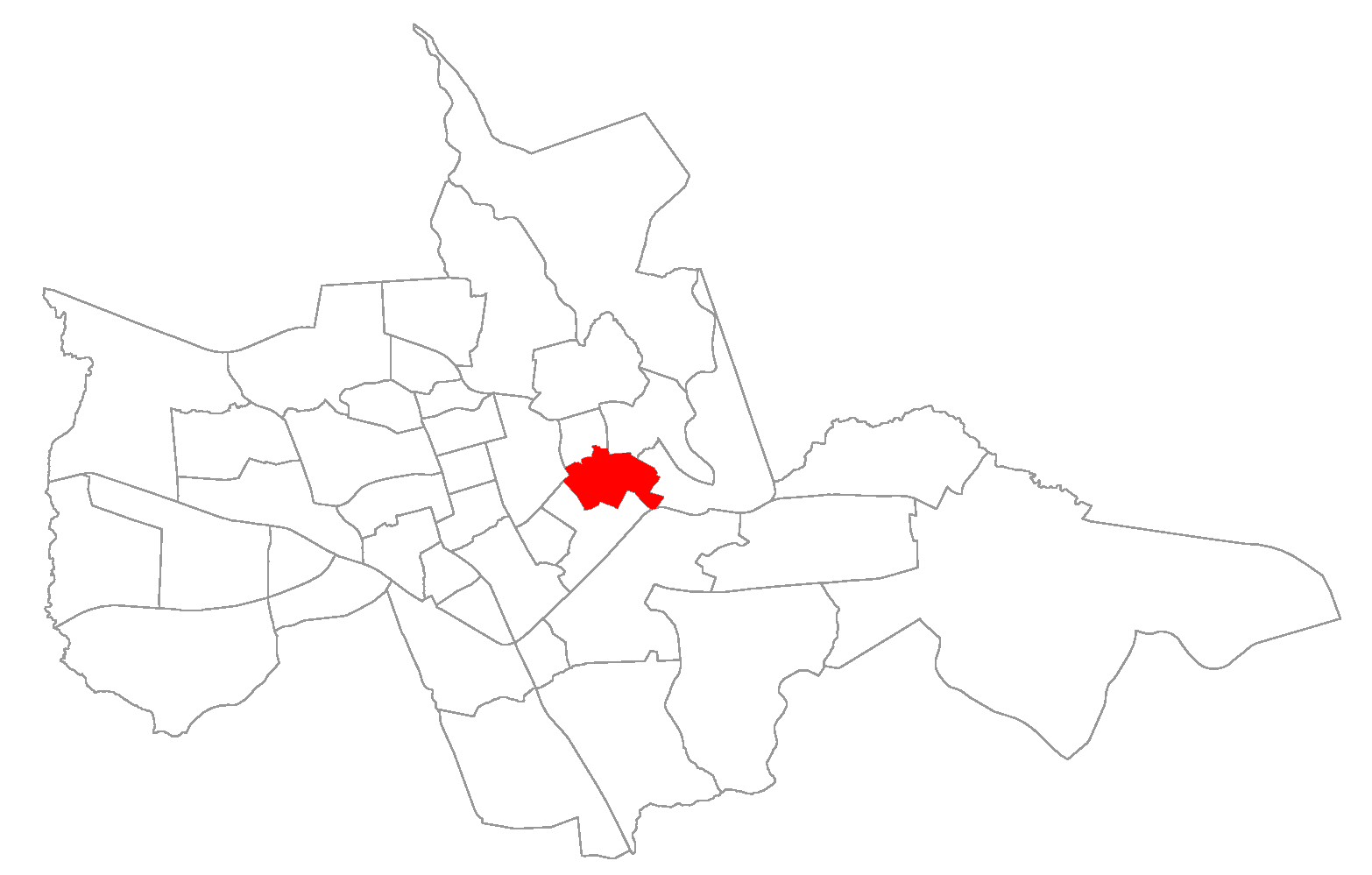
- The bairro in District of Sede

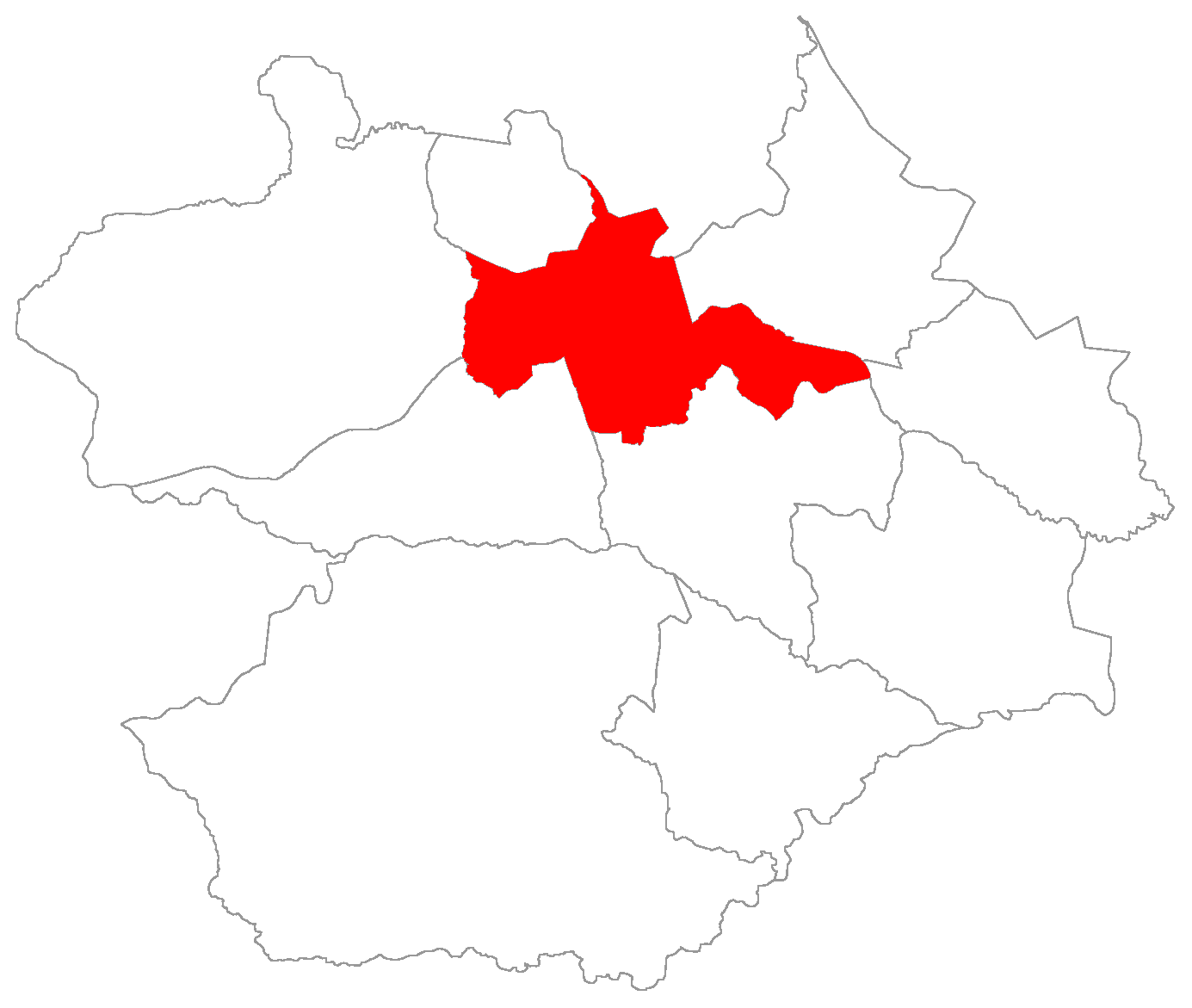
- District of Sede, in Santa Maria City, Rio Grande do Sul, Brazil
- Coordinates: 29°41′22.89″S 53°47′27.79″W
- Country: Brazil
- State: Rio Grande do Sul
- Municipality/City: Santa Maria
- District: District of Sede

Area
  - Total: 1.0873 km^{2} (0.4198 sq mi)

Population
  - Total: 4,656
  - Density: 4,282/km^{2} (11,090/sq mi)
- Postal code: 97.050-030 to 97.095-629
- Adjacent bairros: Centro, Cerrito, Km 3, Menino Jesus, Nossa Senhora de Lourdes, Presidente João Goulart
- Website: Official site of Santa Maria

Nossa Senhora das Dores ("Our Lady of Sorrows") is a bairro in the District of Sede in the municipality of Santa Maria, in the Brazilian state of Rio Grande do Sul. It is located in northeast Santa Maria.

== Villages ==
The bairro contains the following villages: Dores, Loteamento Bela Vista, Loteamento Londero, Vila Cassel, Vila Roemer, Vila Rossato, Vila Sinhá, Vila São Luiz, Vila Tombési.
