= Pinheiro Machado =

Pinheiro Machado (1851–1915) was a Brazilian politician and military officer.

Pinheiro Machado may also refer to:

- Pinheiro Machado, Rio Grande do Sul, a municipality in the state of Rio Grande do Sul, Brazil
- Pinheiro Machado, Santa Maria, a bairro in the municipality of Santa Maria
