= Juscelino Kubitschek, Santa Maria =

Juscelino Kubitschek
- Bairro
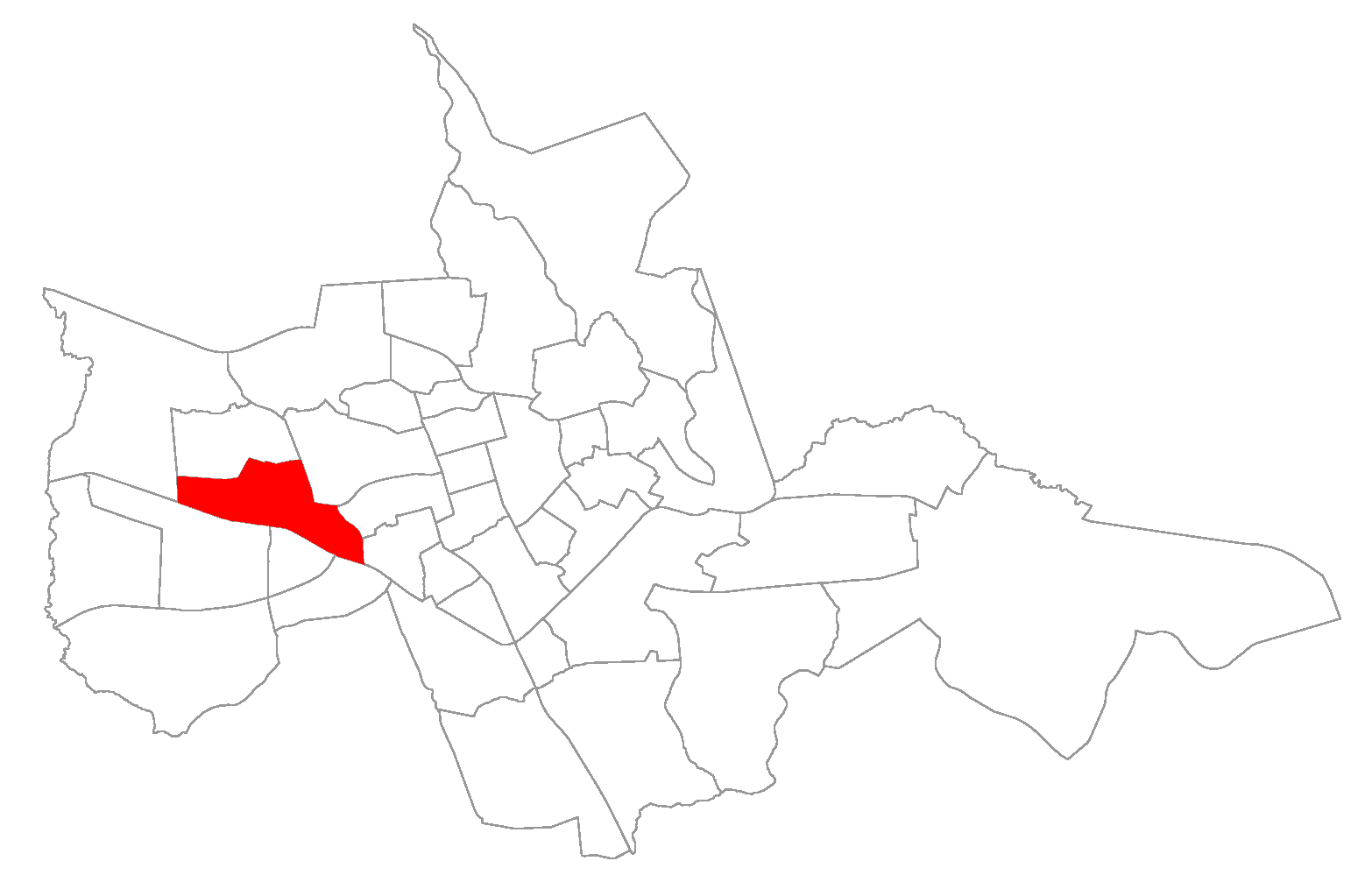
- The bairro in District of Sede

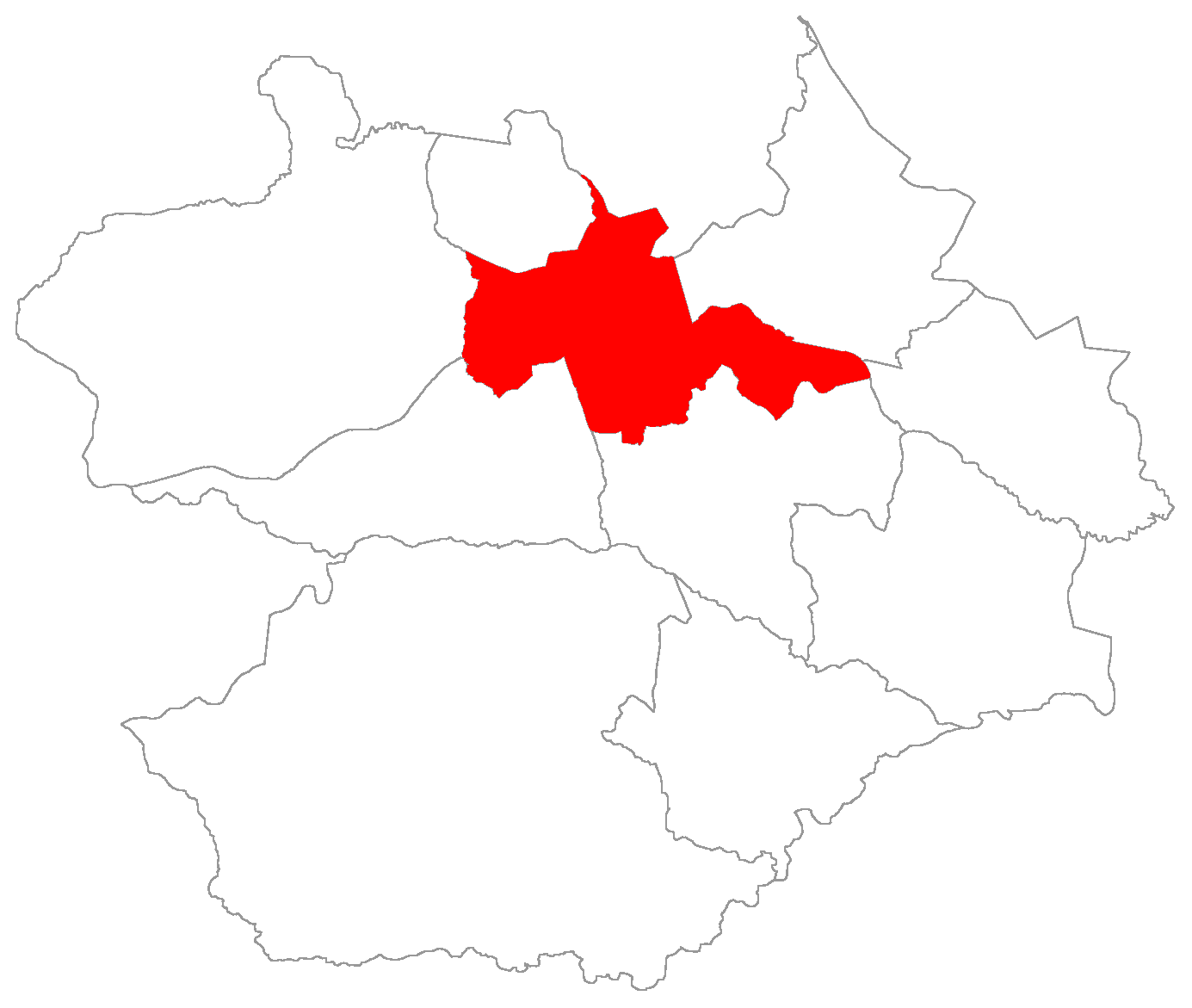
- District of Sede, in Santa Maria City, Rio Grande do Sul, Brazil
- Coordinates: 29°41′33.66″S 53°51′03.35″W
- Country: Brazil
- State: Rio Grande do Sul
- Municipality/City: Santa Maria
- District: District of Sede

Area
  - Total: 2.5066 km^{2} (0.9678 sq mi)

Population
  - Total: 13,730
  - Density: 5,478/km^{2} (14,190/sq mi)
- Postal code: 97.035-000 to 97.038-050
- Adjacent bairros: Agroindustrial, Noal, Nova Santa Marta, Passo d'Areia, Patronato, Pinheiro Machado, Renascença, São João.
- Website: Official site of Santa Maria

Juscelino Kubitschek (Portuguese pronunciation: [??????], "Juscelino Kubitschek - Brazilian president") is a bairro in the District of Sede in the municipality of Santa Maria, in the Brazilian state of Rio Grande do Sul. It is located in west Santa Maria.

== Villages ==
The bairro contains the following villages: Conjunto Habitacional Santa Marta, Juscelino Kubitschek, Vila Caramelo, Vila Jóquei Clube, Vila Martelet, Vila Prado, Vila Rigão.

== Gallery of photos ==
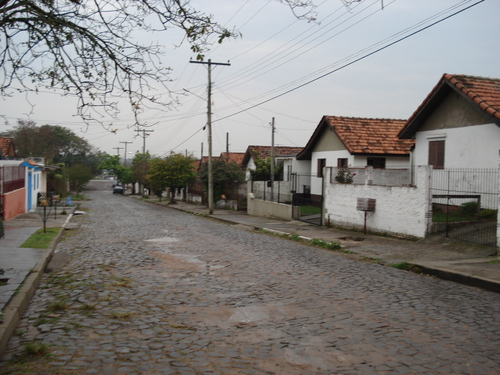
