= Renascença, Santa Maria =

Renascença
- Bairro
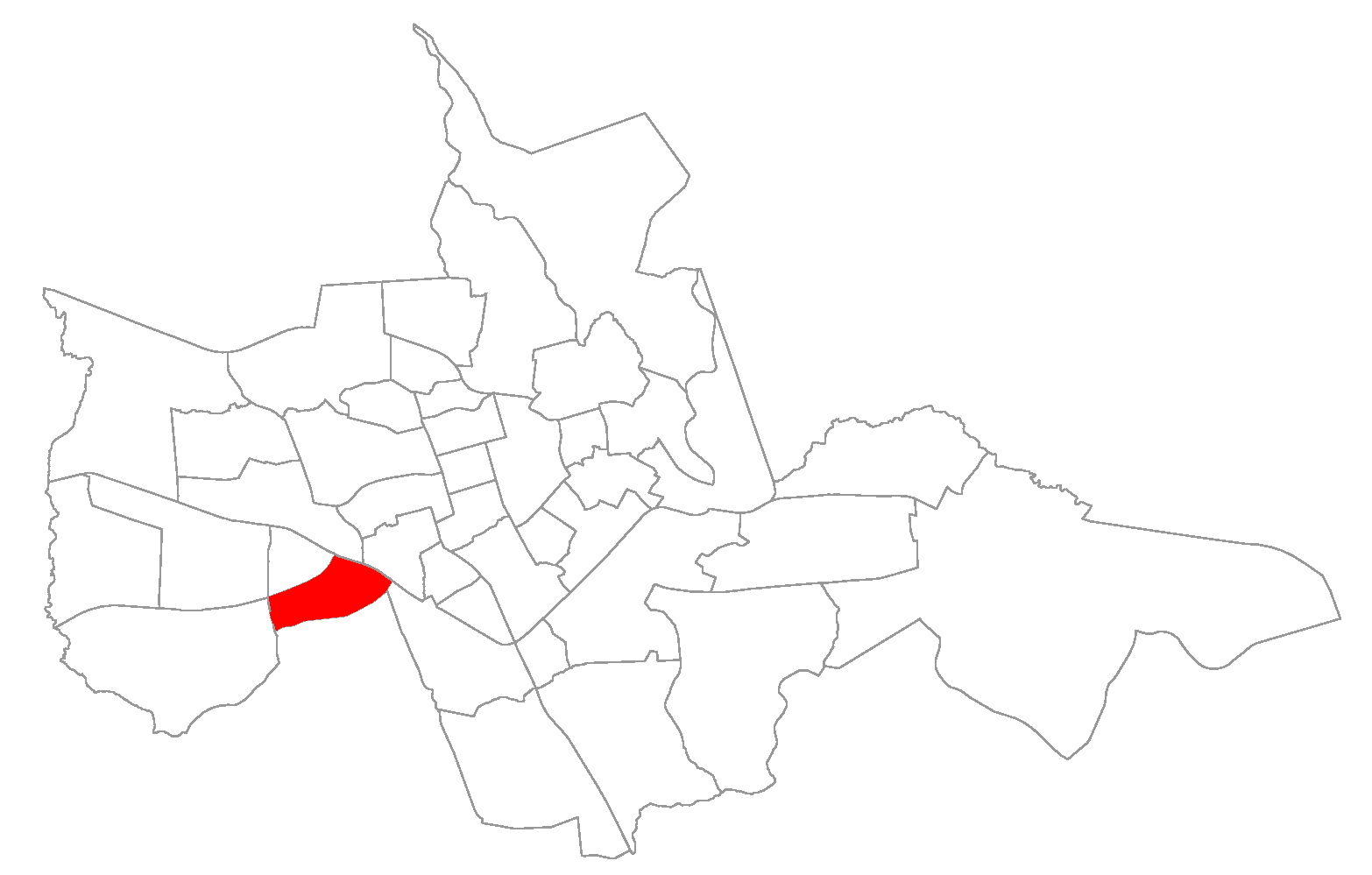
- The bairro in District of Sede

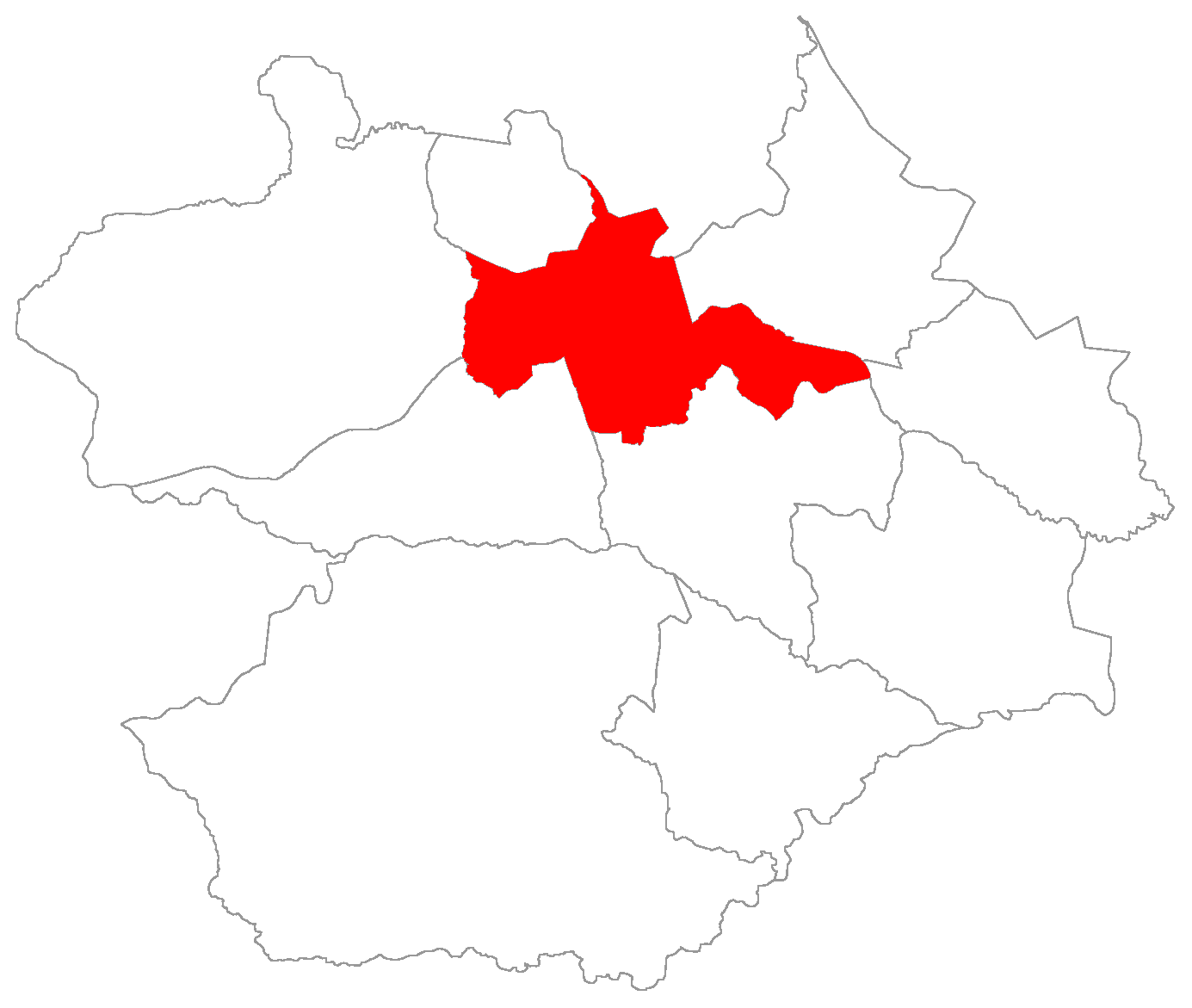
- District of Sede, in Santa Maria City, Rio Grande do Sul, Brazil
- Coordinates: 29°42′26.84″S 53°50′32.51″W
- Country: Brazil
- State: Rio Grande do Sul
- Municipality/City: Santa Maria
- District: District of Sede

Area
  - Total: 1.3883 km^{2} (0.5360 sq mi)

Population
  - Total: 1,791
  - Density: 1,290/km^{2} (3,341/sq mi)
- Postal code: 97.030-624 to 97.030-749
- Adjacent bairros: Boi Morto, Juscelino Kubitschek, Patronato, Pinheiro Machado, São João, São Valentim, Urlândia.
- Website: Official site of Santa Maria

Renascença ("renascence") is a bairro in the District of Sede in the municipality of Santa Maria, in the Brazilian state of Rio Grande do Sul. It is located in west Santa Maria.

== Villages ==
The bairro contains the following villages: Condomínio Residencial Arco Verde, Renascença, Vila Renascença.
