= Tancredo Neves, Santa Maria =

Tancredo Neves
- Bairro
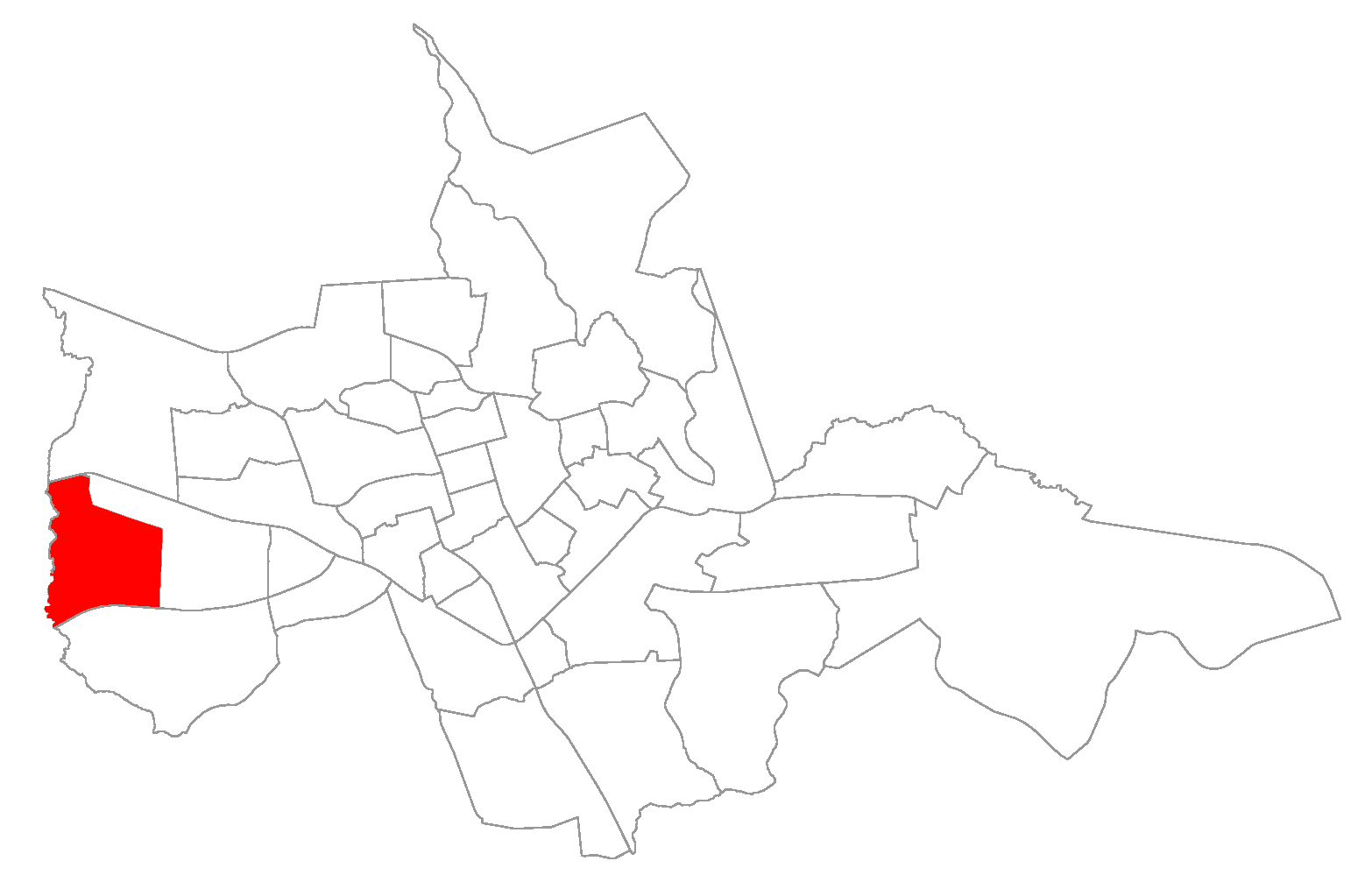
- The bairro in District of Sede

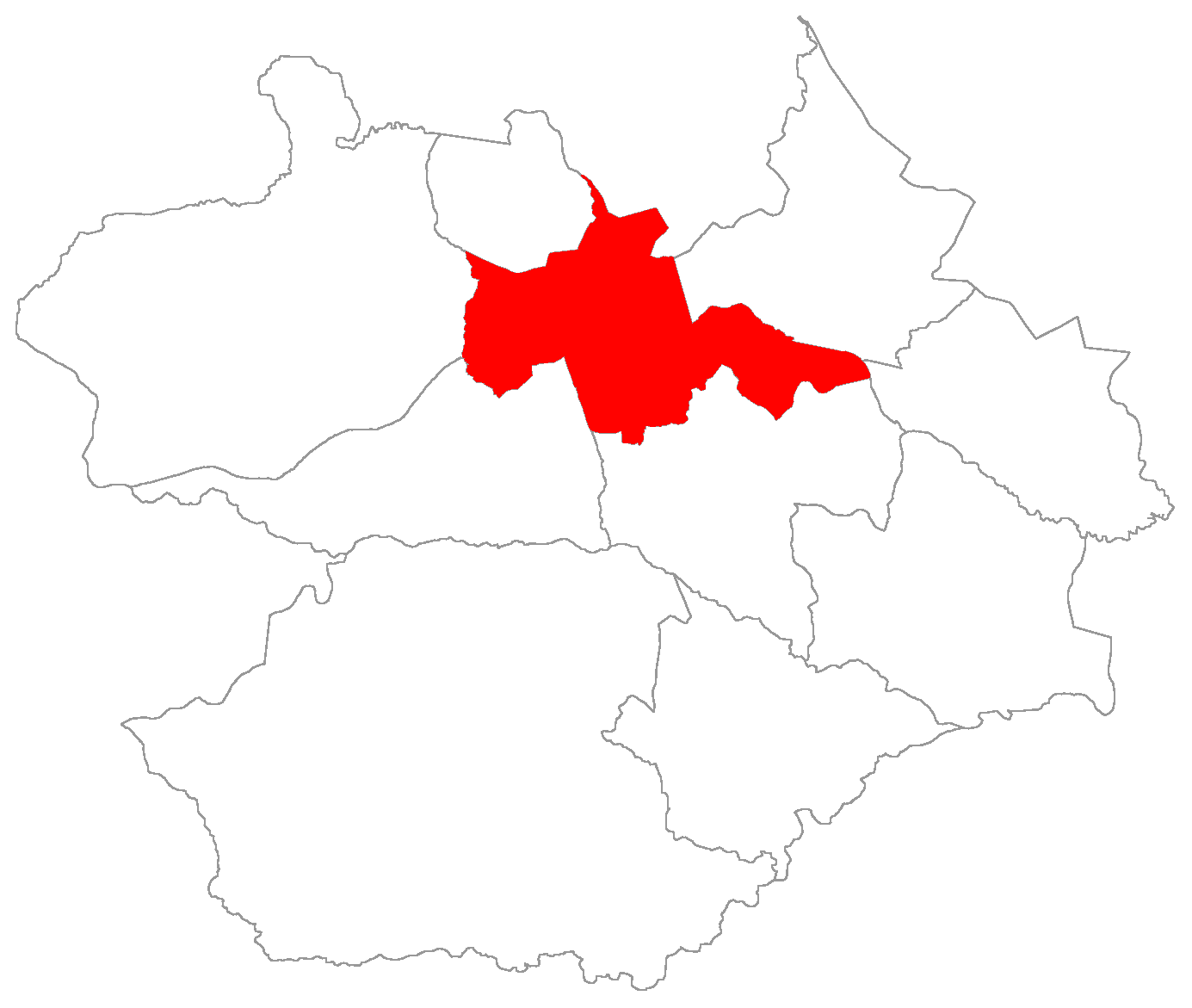
- District of Sede, in Santa Maria City, Rio Grande do Sul, Brazil
- Coordinates: 29°42′02.82″S 53°52′53.25″W
- Country: Brazil
- State: Rio Grande do Sul
- Municipality/City: Santa Maria
- District: District of Sede

Area
  - Total: 3.3865 km^{2} (1.3075 sq mi)

Population
  - Total: 11,456
  - Density: 3,382.8/km^{2} (8,761.5/sq mi)
- Postal code: 97.032-000 to 97.032-899
- Adjacent bairros: Agroindustrial, Boca do Monte, Boi Morto, Pinheiro Machado, São Valentim.
- Website: Official site of Santa Maria

Tancredo Neves ("Tancredo Neves - Brazilian President") is a bairro in the District of Sede in the municipality of Santa Maria, in the Brazilian state of Rio Grande do Sul. It is located in west Santa Maria.

== Villages ==
The bairro contains the following villages: Conjunto Residencial Piratini, Núcleo Habitacional Tancredo Neves, Tancredo Neves, Vila Canaã.

== Gallery of photos ==
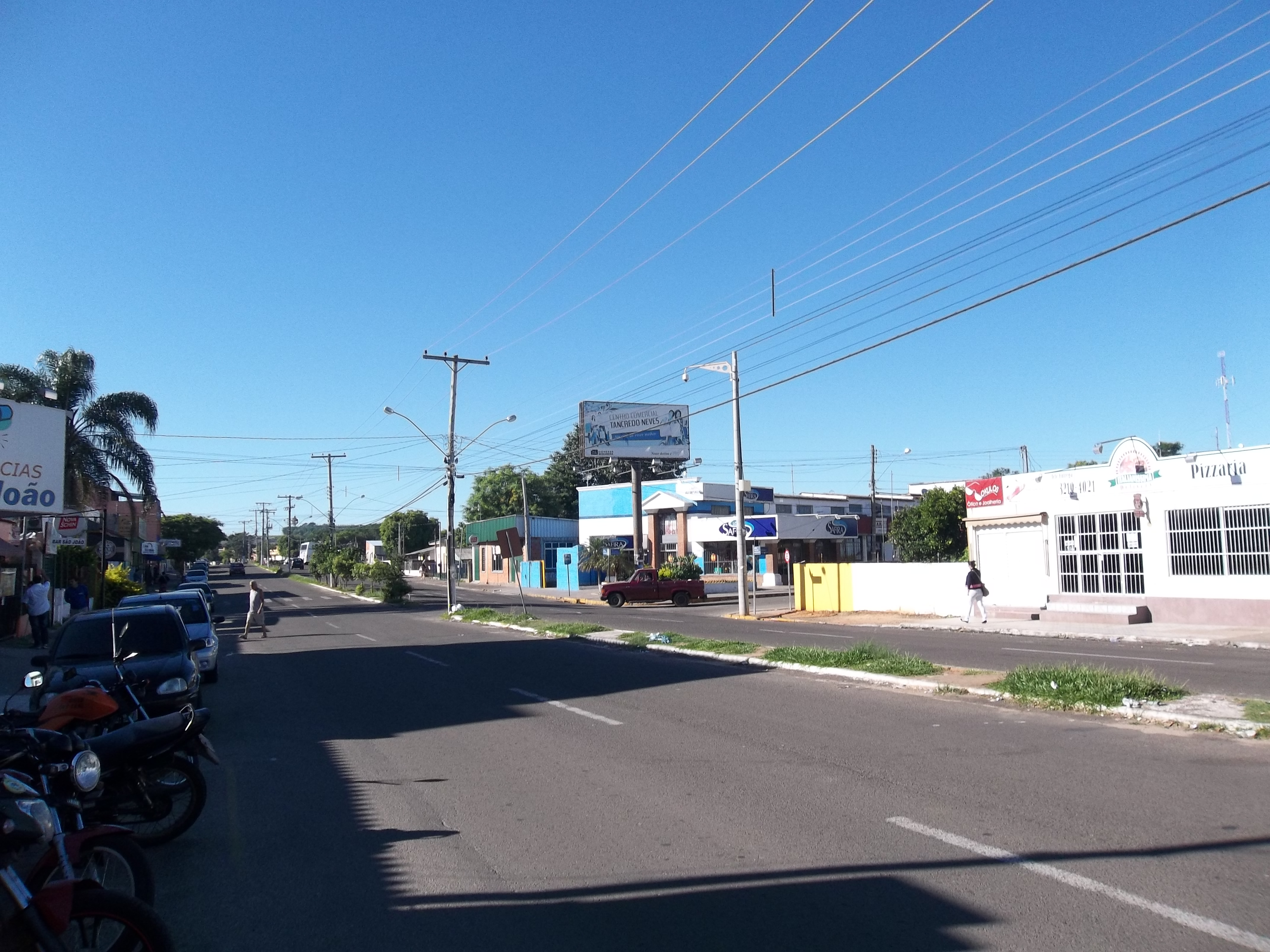

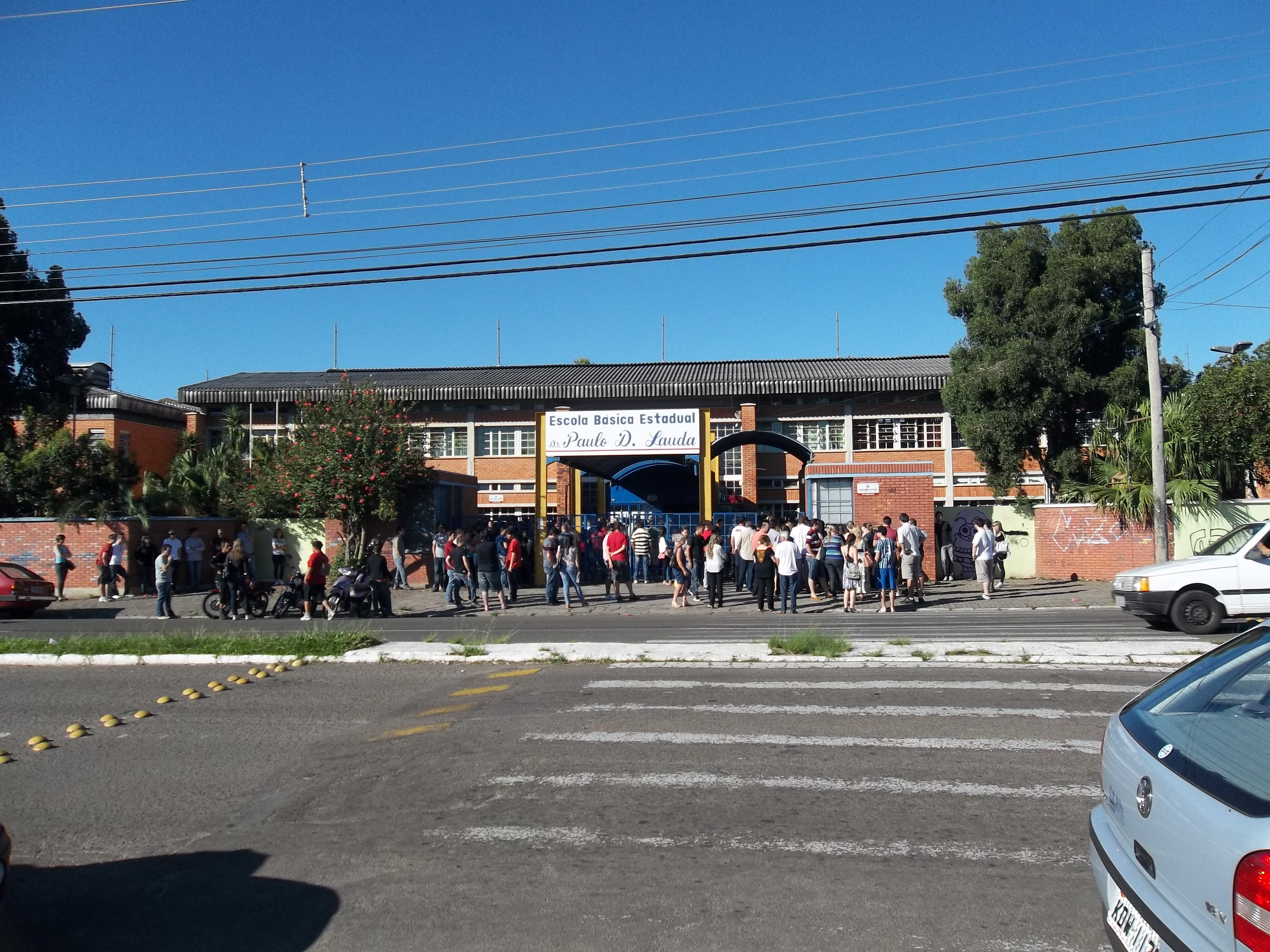

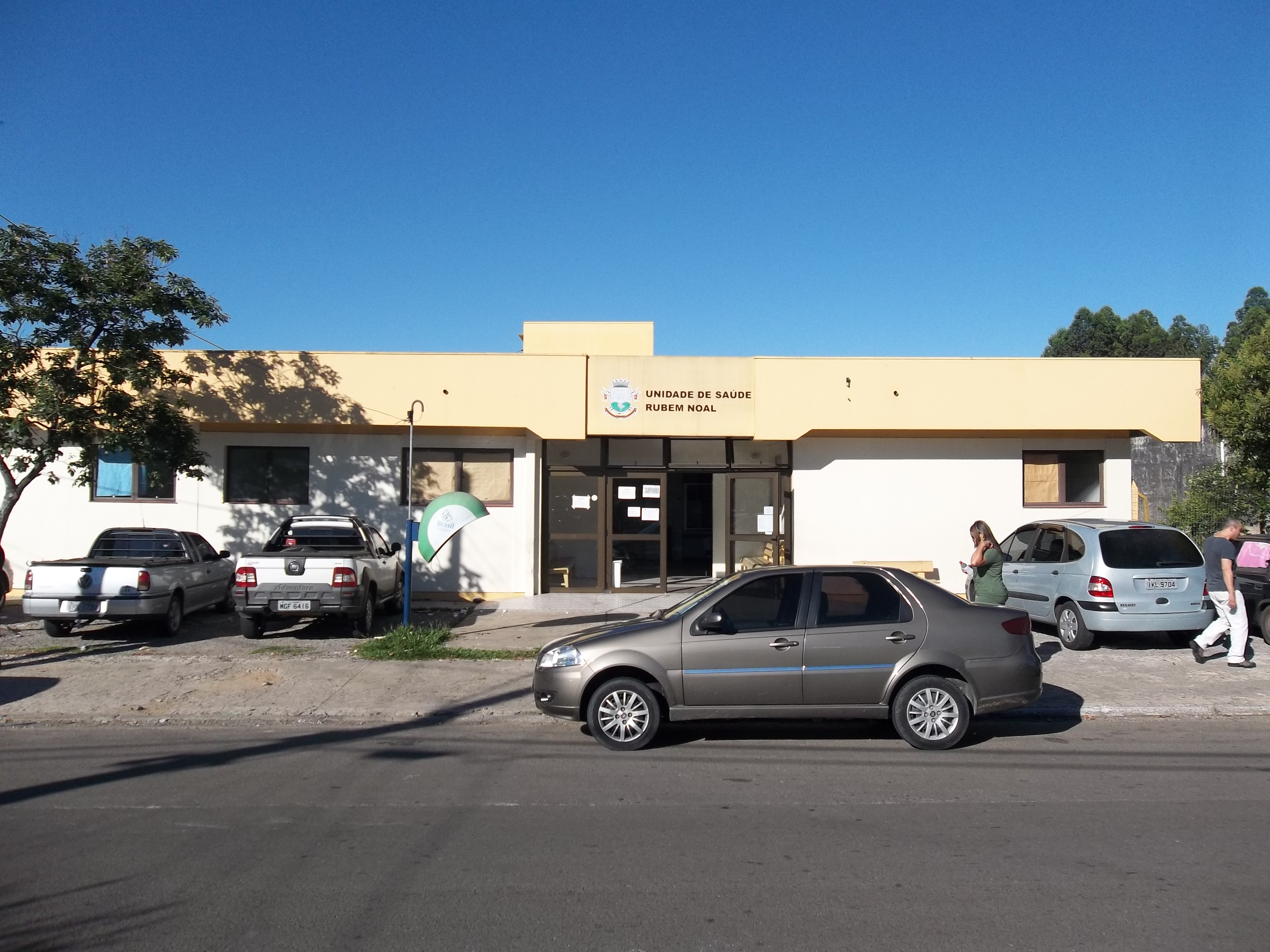
