= Boi Morto =

- Bairro
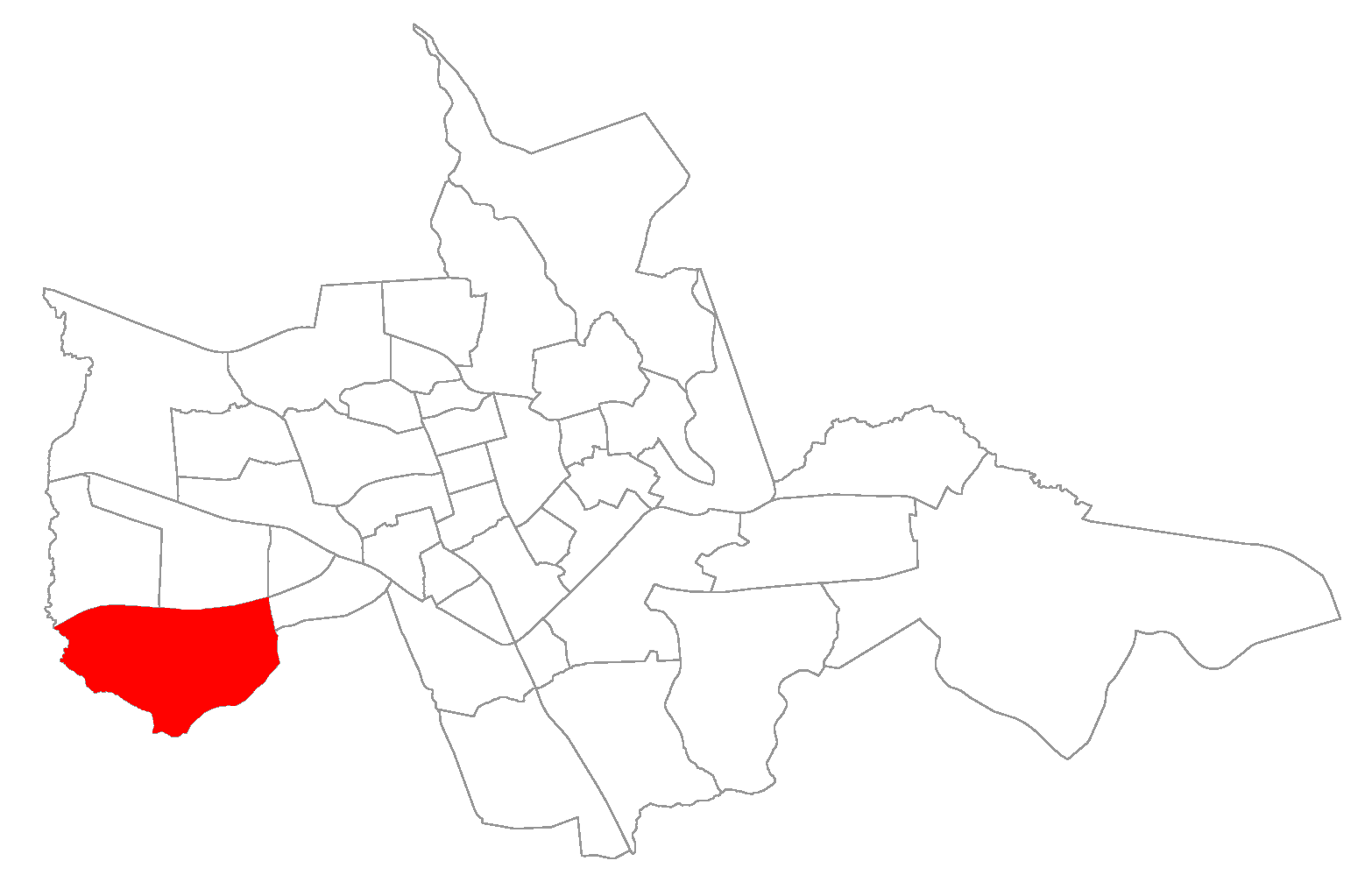
- The bairro in District of Sede

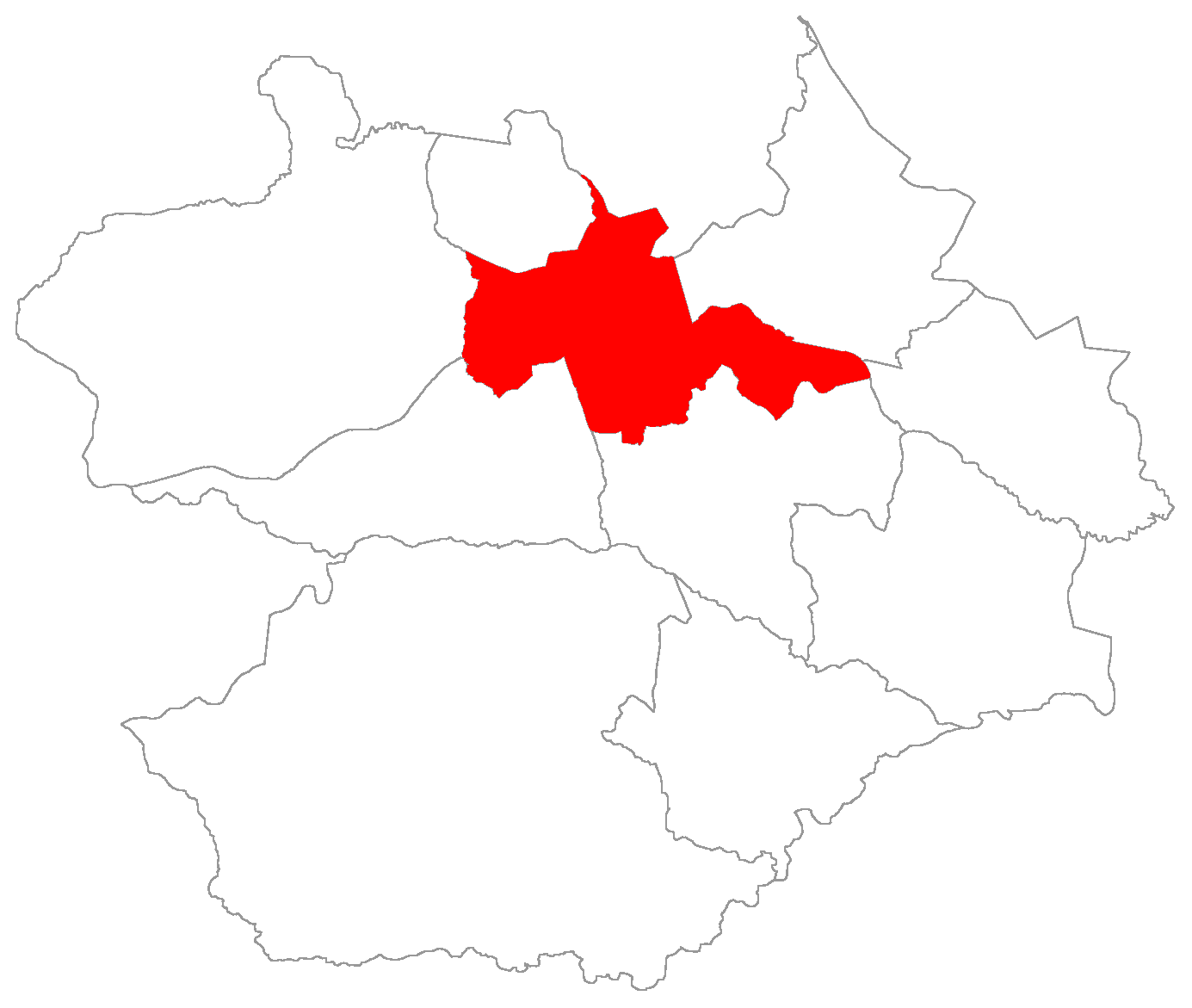
- District of Sede, in Santa Maria City, Rio Grande do Sul, Brazil
- Coordinates: 29°42′45.43″S 53°51′59.80″W
- Country: Brazil
- State: Rio Grande do Sul
- Municipality/City: Santa Maria
- District: District of Sede

Area
  - Total: 5.7093 km^{2} (2.2044 sq mi)

Population
  - Total: 2,561
  - Density: 448.6/km^{2} (1,162/sq mi)
- Postal code: 97.030-100 to 97.030-833
- Adjacent bairros: Boca do Monte, Pinheiro Machado, Renascença, São João, São Valentim, Tancredo Neves.
- Website: Official site of Santa Maria

Boi Morto (Portuguese pronunciation: [ˈboj ˈmoʁtu], "dead ox") is a bairro in the District of Sede in the municipality of Santa Maria, in the Brazilian state of Rio Grande do Sul. It is located in west Santa Maria.

== Villages ==
The bairro contains the following villages: Boi Morto, Rincão dos Bentos, Vila Boi Morto, Vila Cauduro, Vila Querência, Vila Santa Catarina.

== Gallery of photos ==
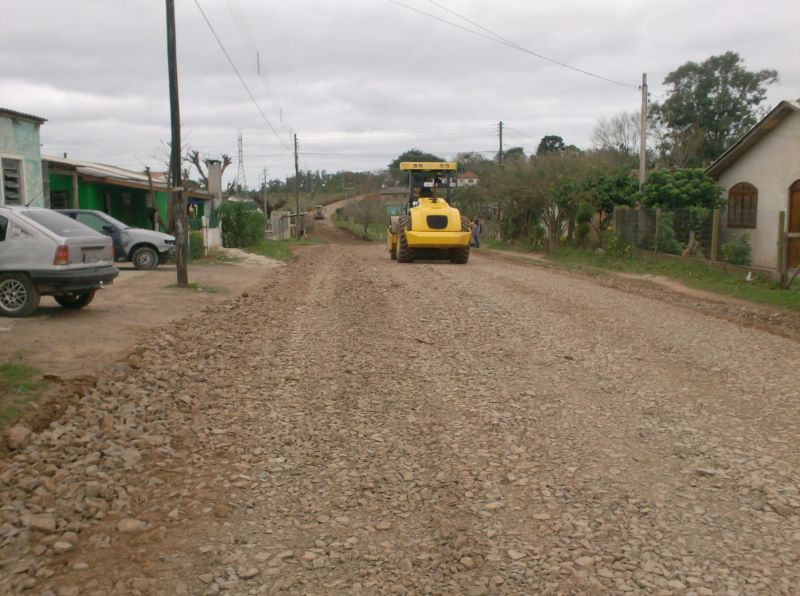
