= São Valentim, Santa Maria =

São Valentim
- Bairro
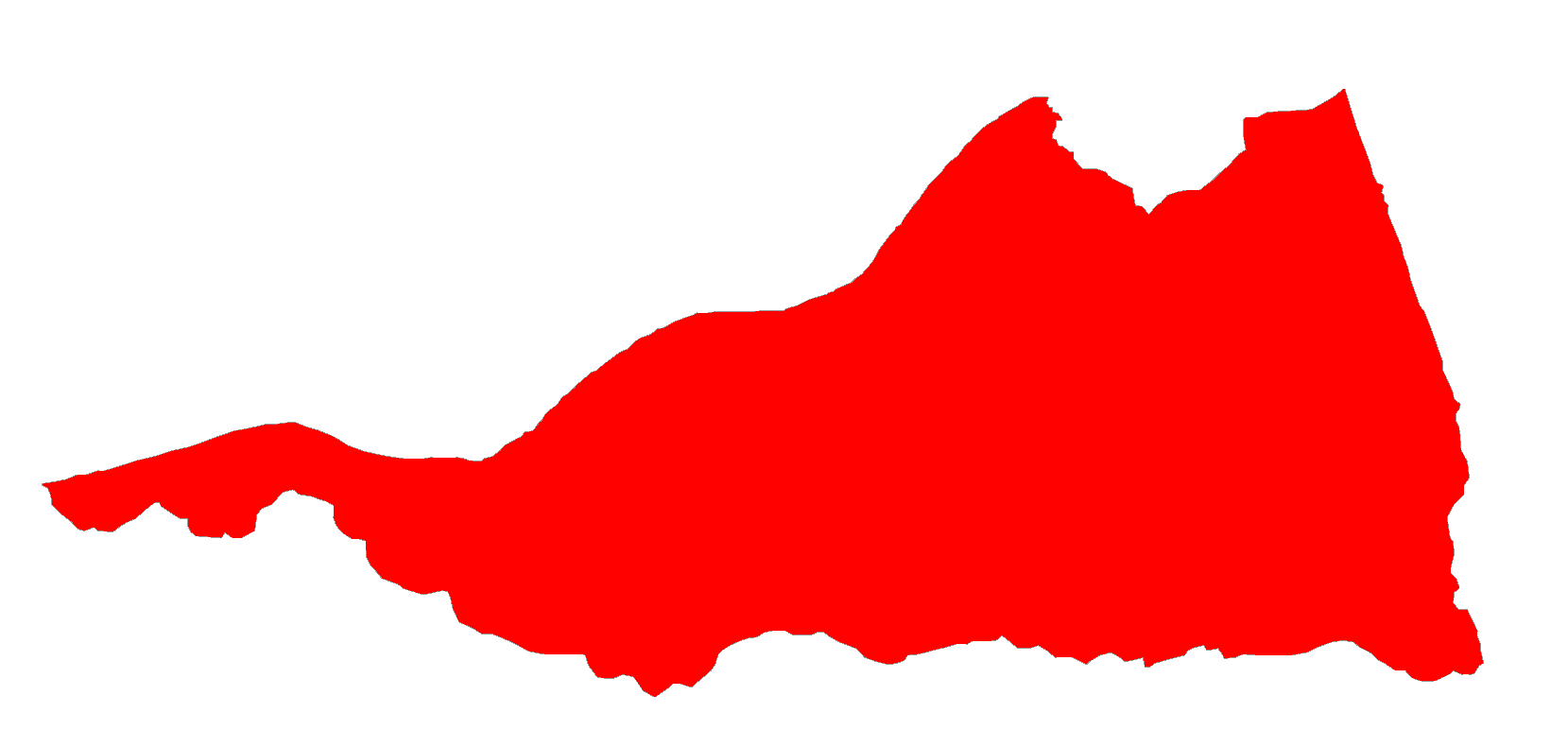
- The bairro in District of São Valentim

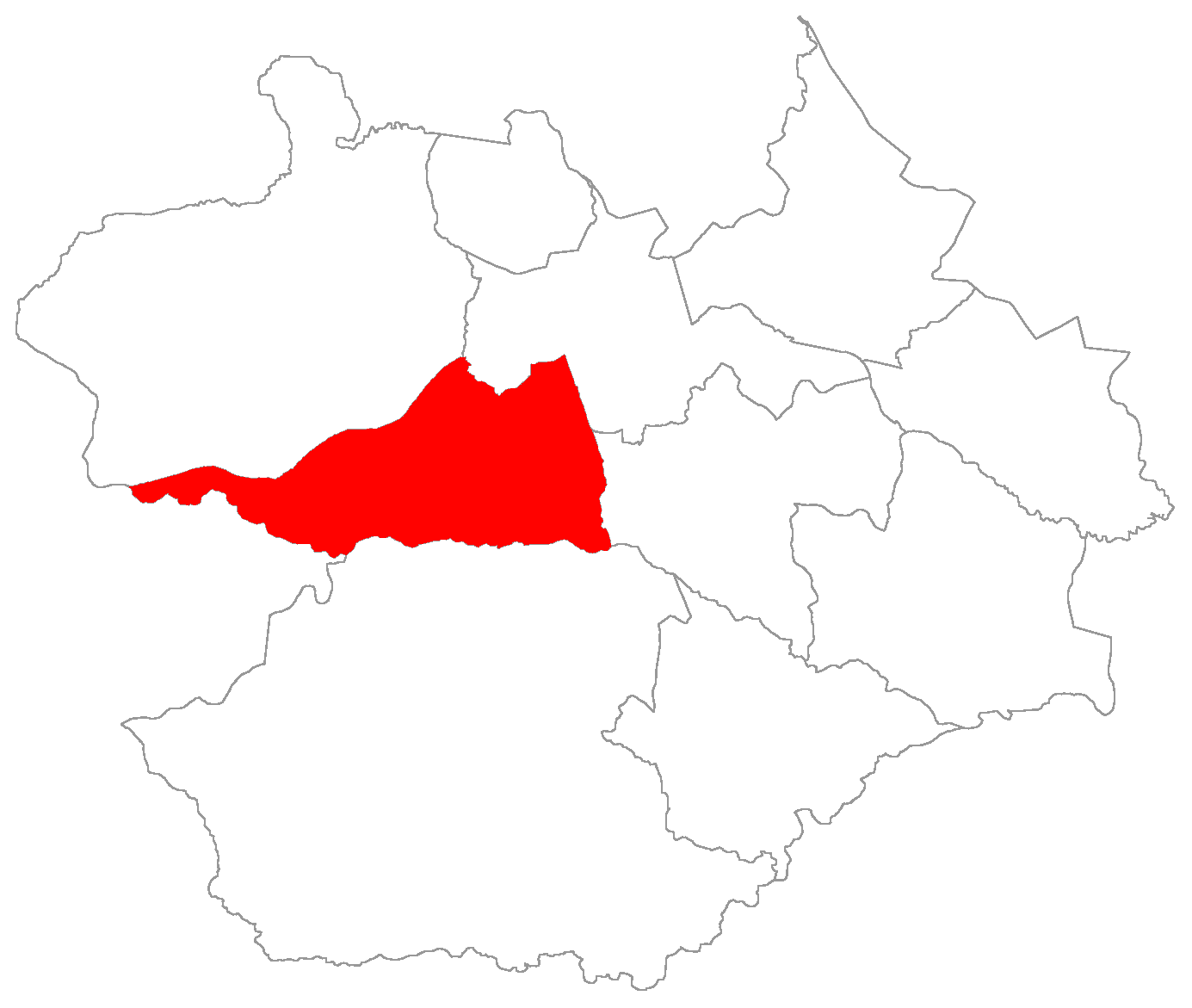
- District of São Valentim, in Santa Maria City, Rio Grande do Sul, Brazil
- Coordinates: 29°45′04.65″S 53°53′43.61″W
- Country: Brazil
- State: Rio Grande do Sul
- Municipality/City: Santa Maria
- District: District of São Valentim

Area
  - Total: 133.3800 km^{2} (51.4983 sq mi)

Population
  - Total: 565
  - Density: 4.24/km^{2} (11.0/sq mi)
- Postal code: 97.145-000
- Adjacent bairros: Boca do Monte, Boi Morto, Lorenzi, Pains, Renascença, Santa Flora, Tancredo Neves, Urlândia.
- Website: Official site of Santa Maria

São Valentim (Portuguese pronunciation: [ˈsãw valẽˈtĩ], "Saint Valentine") is a bairro in the District of São Valentim in the municipality of Santa Maria, in the Brazilian state of Rio Grande do Sul. It is situated in south of Santa Maria.

== Villages ==
The bairro contains the following villages: Alto das Palmeiras, Área Militar, Capão do Piquenique, Colônia Conceição, Colônia Toniolo, Laranjeiras, Passo da Laranjeira, Passo do Sarandi, Picadinha, Rincão da Lagoa, Rincão dos Brasil, Rincão dos Flores, São Valentim, Vila São Valentim.

== Gallery of photos ==
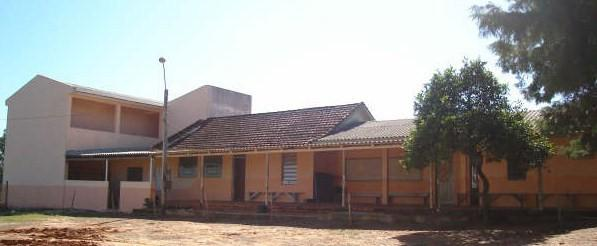
