= São João, Santa Maria =

São João
- Bairro
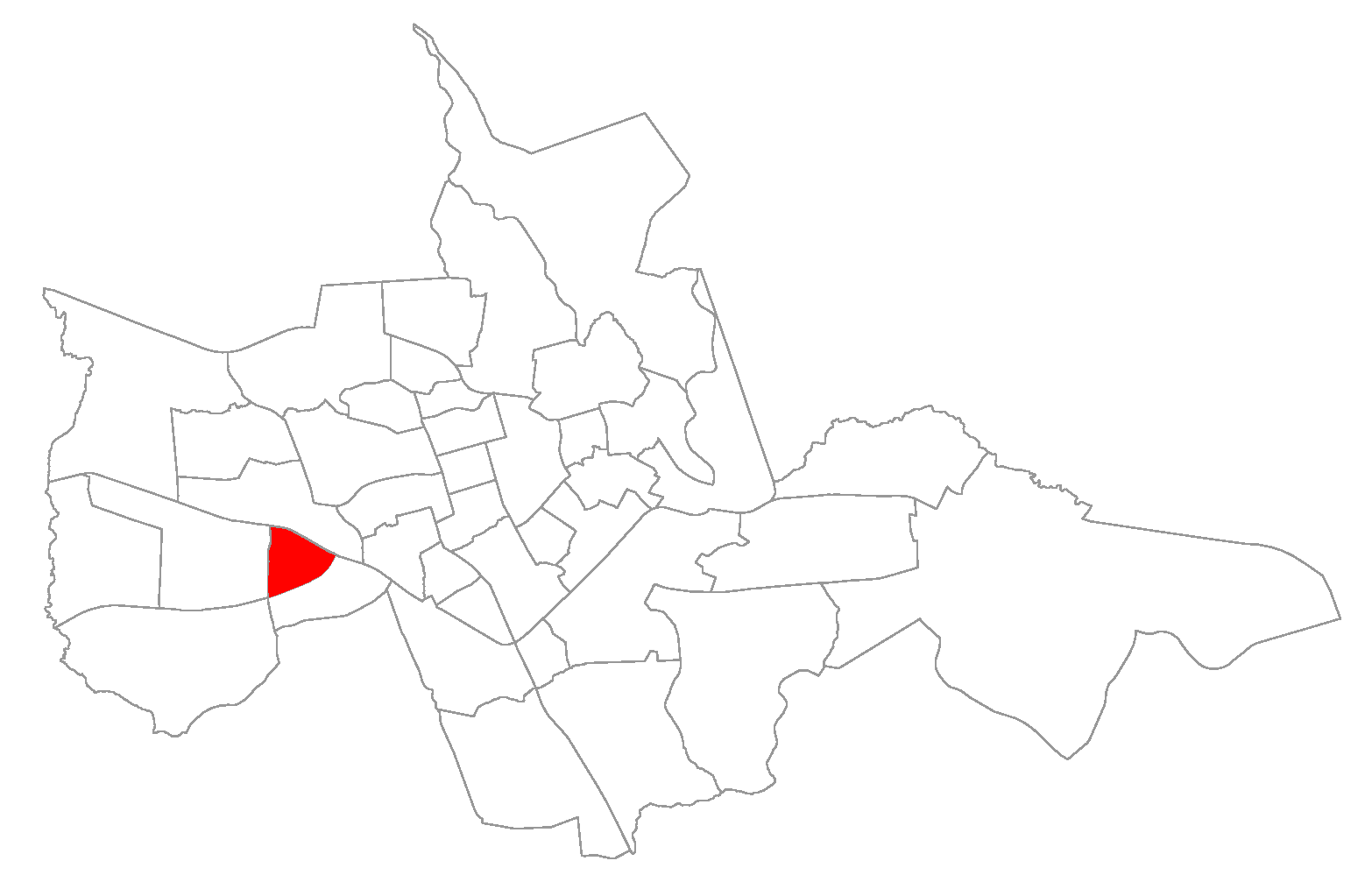
- The bairro in District of Sede

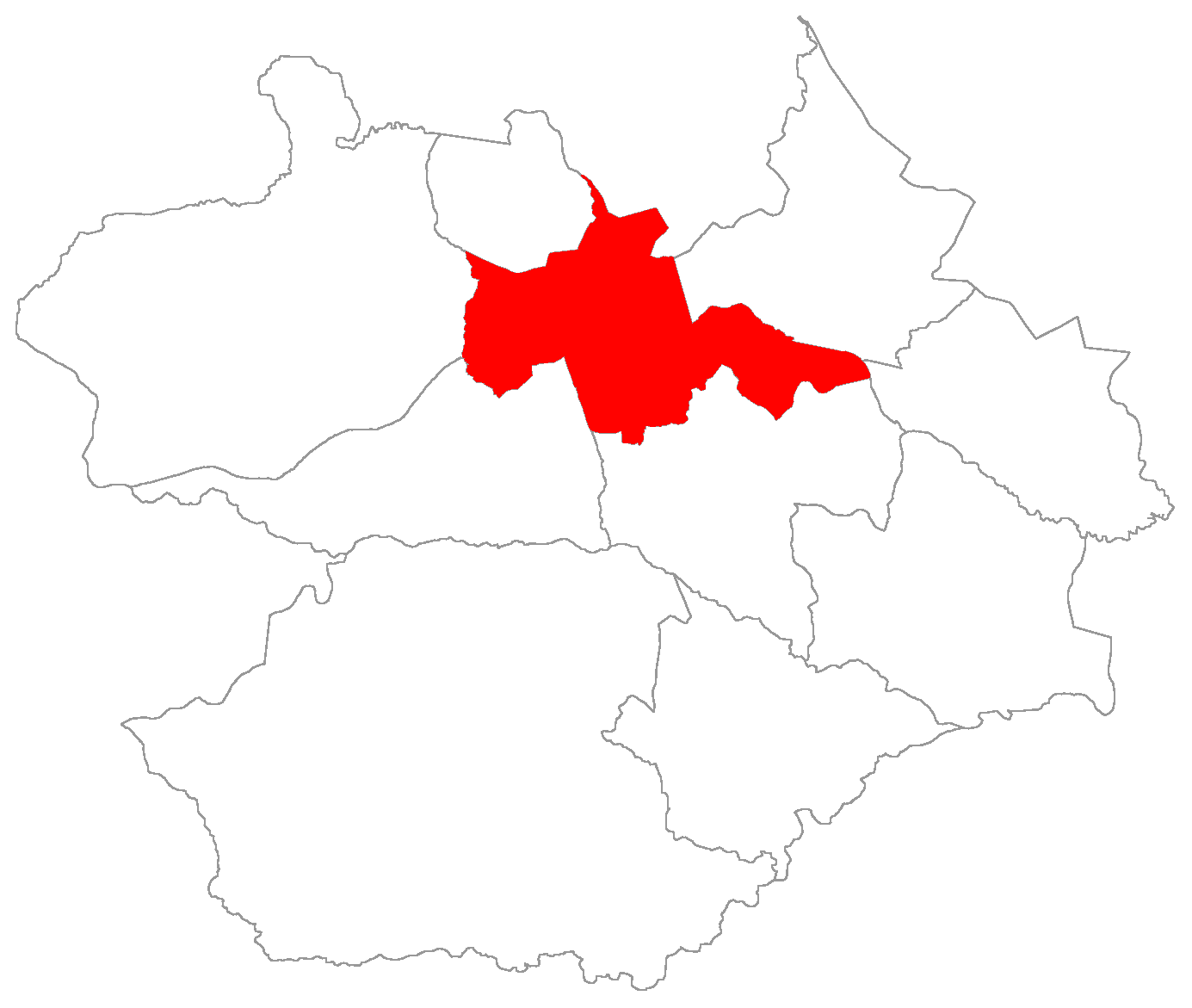
- District of Sede, in Santa Maria City, Rio Grande do Sul, Brazil
- Coordinates: 29°42′04.60″S 53°50′50.44″W
- Country: Brazil
- State: Rio Grande do Sul
- Municipality/City: Santa Maria
- District: District of Sede

Area
  - Total: 0.8611 km^{2} (0.3325 sq mi)

Population
  - Total: 1,706
  - Density: 1,981/km^{2} (5,131/sq mi)
- Postal code: 97.030-000 to 97.030-499
- Adjacent bairros: Boi Morto, Juscelino Kubitschek, Pinheiro Machado, Renascença.
- Website: Official site of Santa Maria

São João ("Saint John") is a bairro in the District of Sede in the municipality of Santa Maria, in the Brazilian state of Rio Grande do Sul. It is located in west Santa Maria.

== Villages ==
The bairro contains the following villages: São João, Vila São João, Vila Schimidt.

== Gallery of photos ==
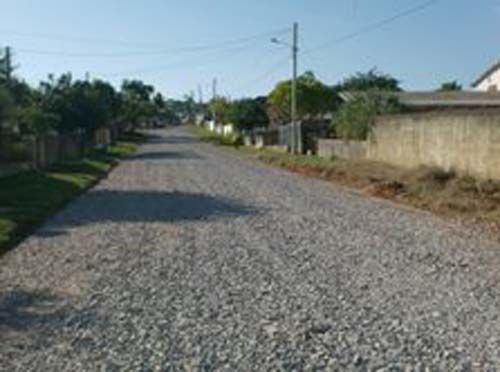
