= Agroindustrial =

- Bairro
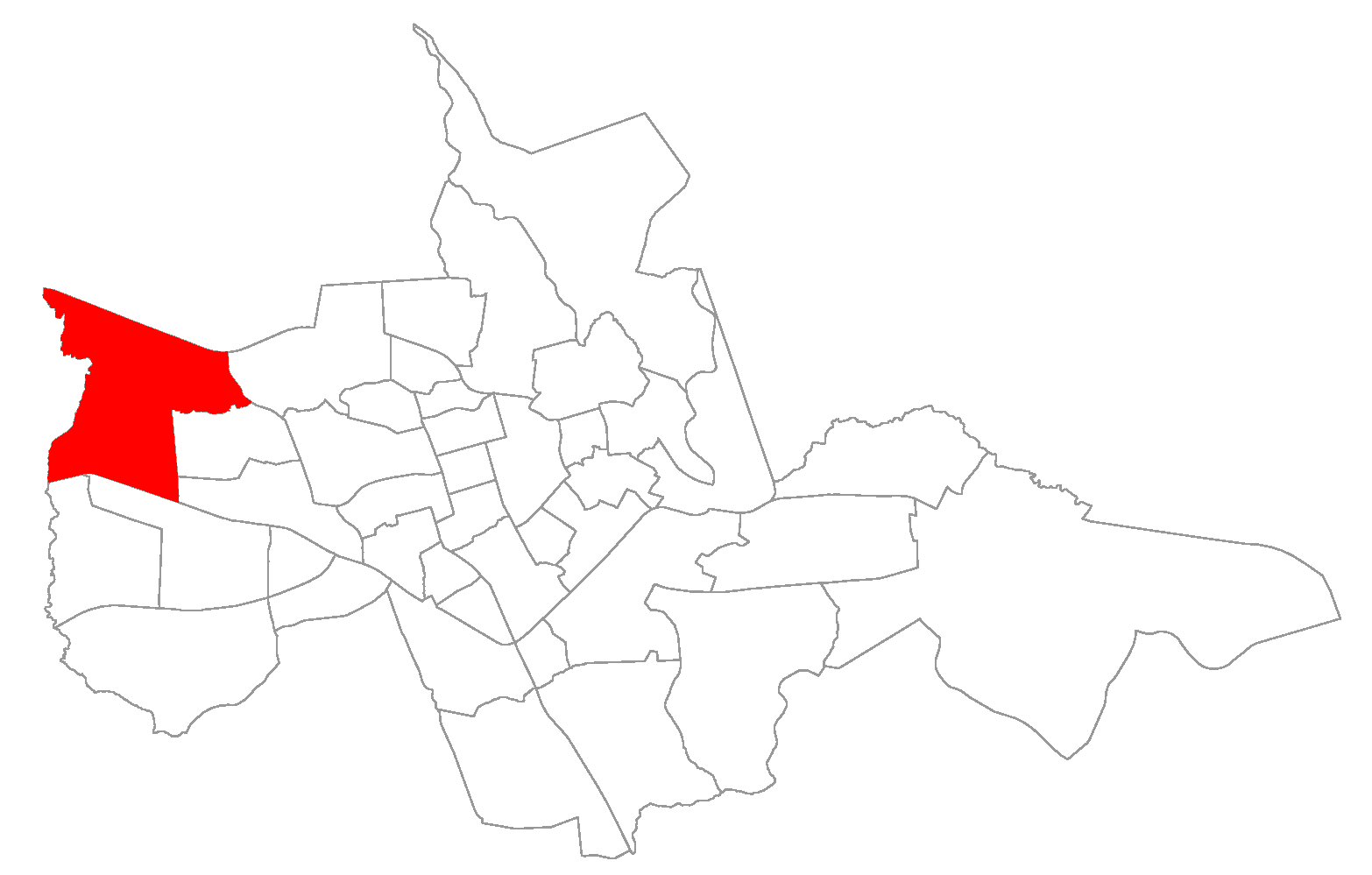
- The bairro in District of Sede

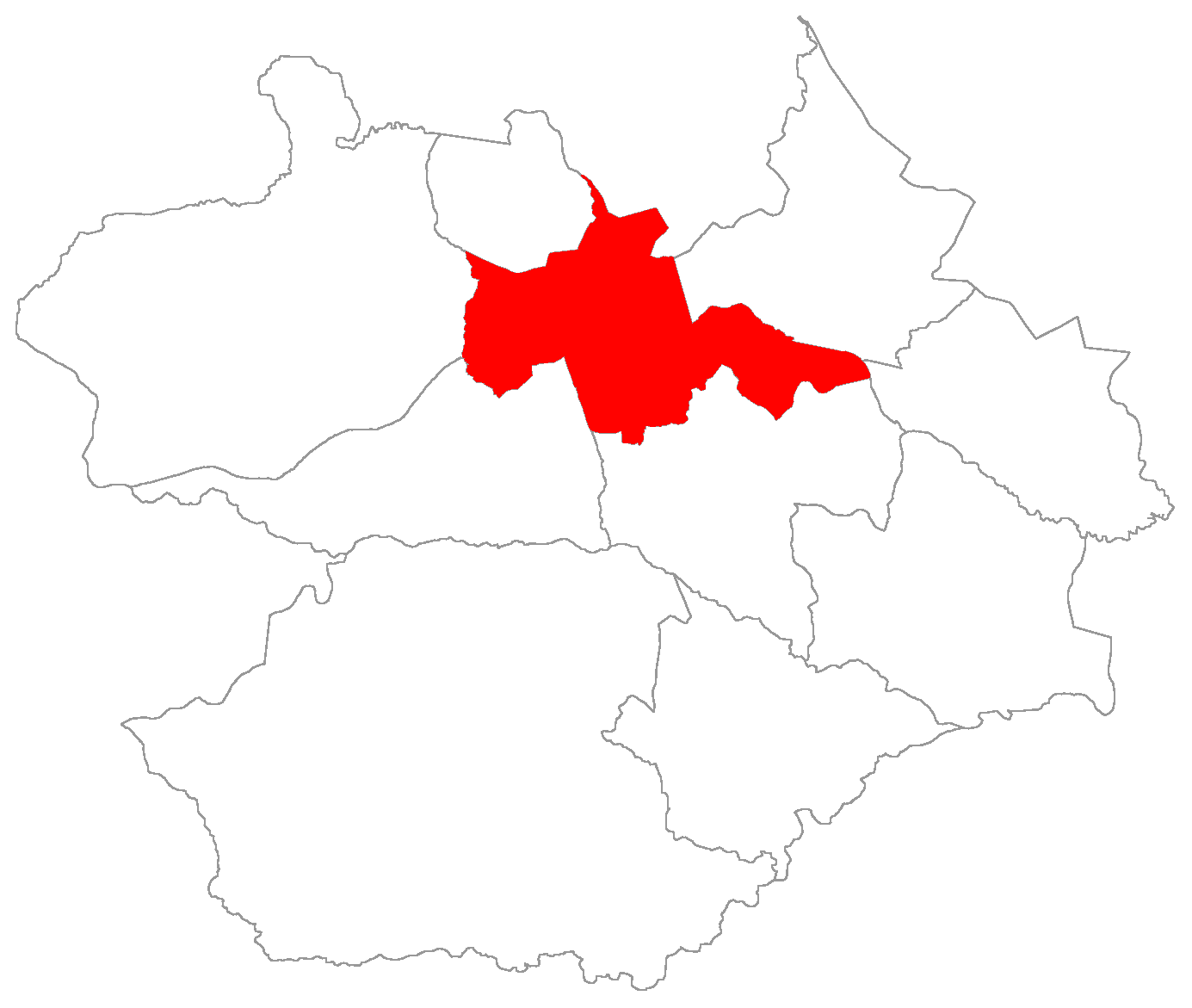
- District of Sede, in Santa Maria City, Rio Grande do Sul, Brazil
- Coordinates: 29°40′55.95″S 53°52′25.37″W
- Country: Brazil
- State: Rio Grande do Sul
- Municipality/City: Santa Maria
- District: District of Sede

Area
  - Total: 6.3266 km^{2} (2.4427 sq mi)

Population
  - Total: 224
  - Density: 35.4/km^{2} (91.7/sq mi)
- Postal code: 97.030-440 to 97.034-499
- Adjacent bairros: Boca do Monte, Caturrita, Nova Santa Marta, Juscelino Kubitschek, Pinheiro Machado, Tancredo Neves, Santo Antão
- Website: Official site of Santa Maria

Agroindustrial ("place for agriculture and manufacturer") is a bairro in the District of Sede in the municipality of Santa Maria, in the Brazilian state of Rio Grande do Sul. It is located in west Santa Maria.

== Villages ==
The bairro contains the following villages: Agroindustrial, Agrovila I, Agrovila II, Distrito industrial

== Gallery of photos ==
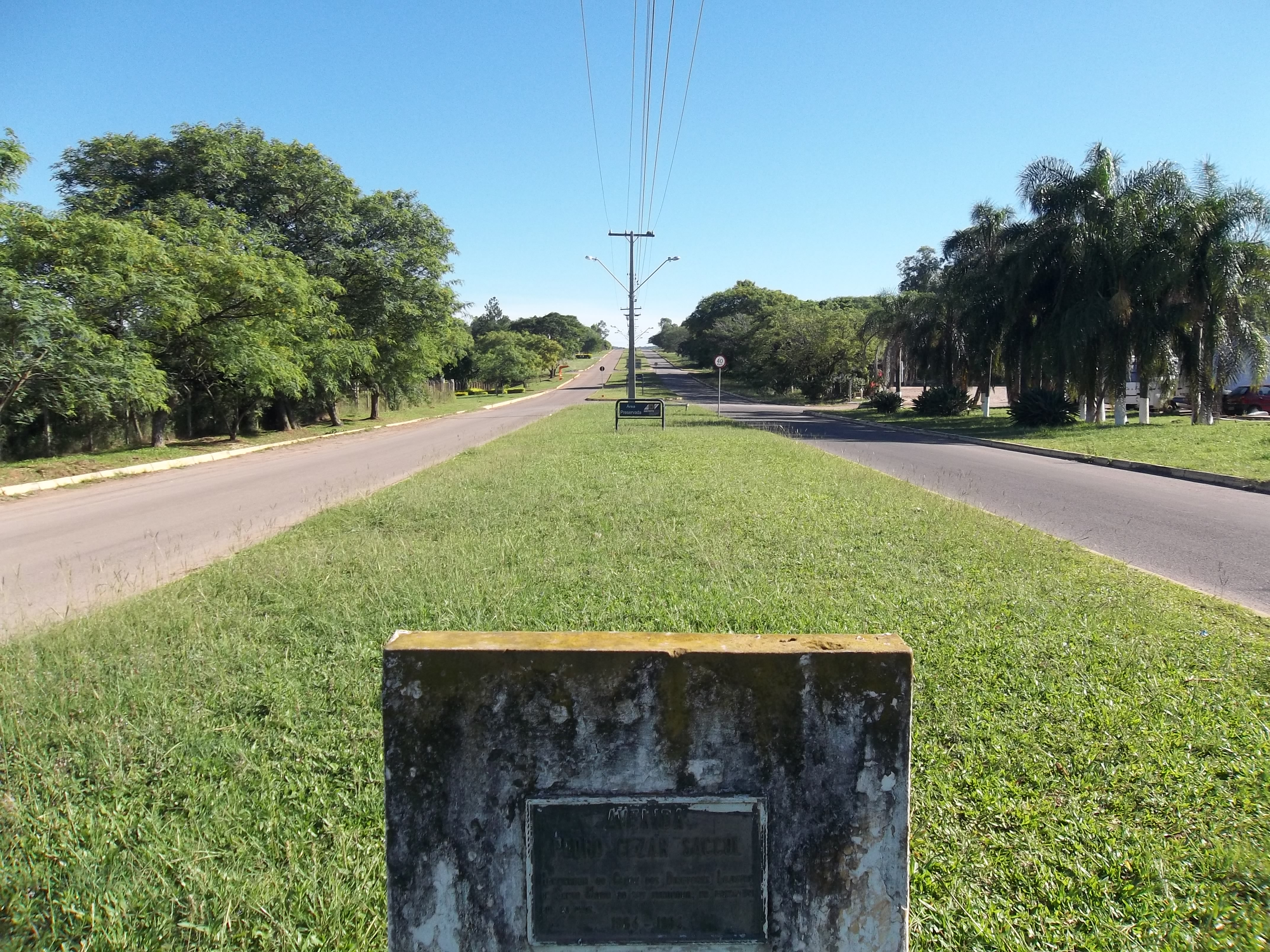

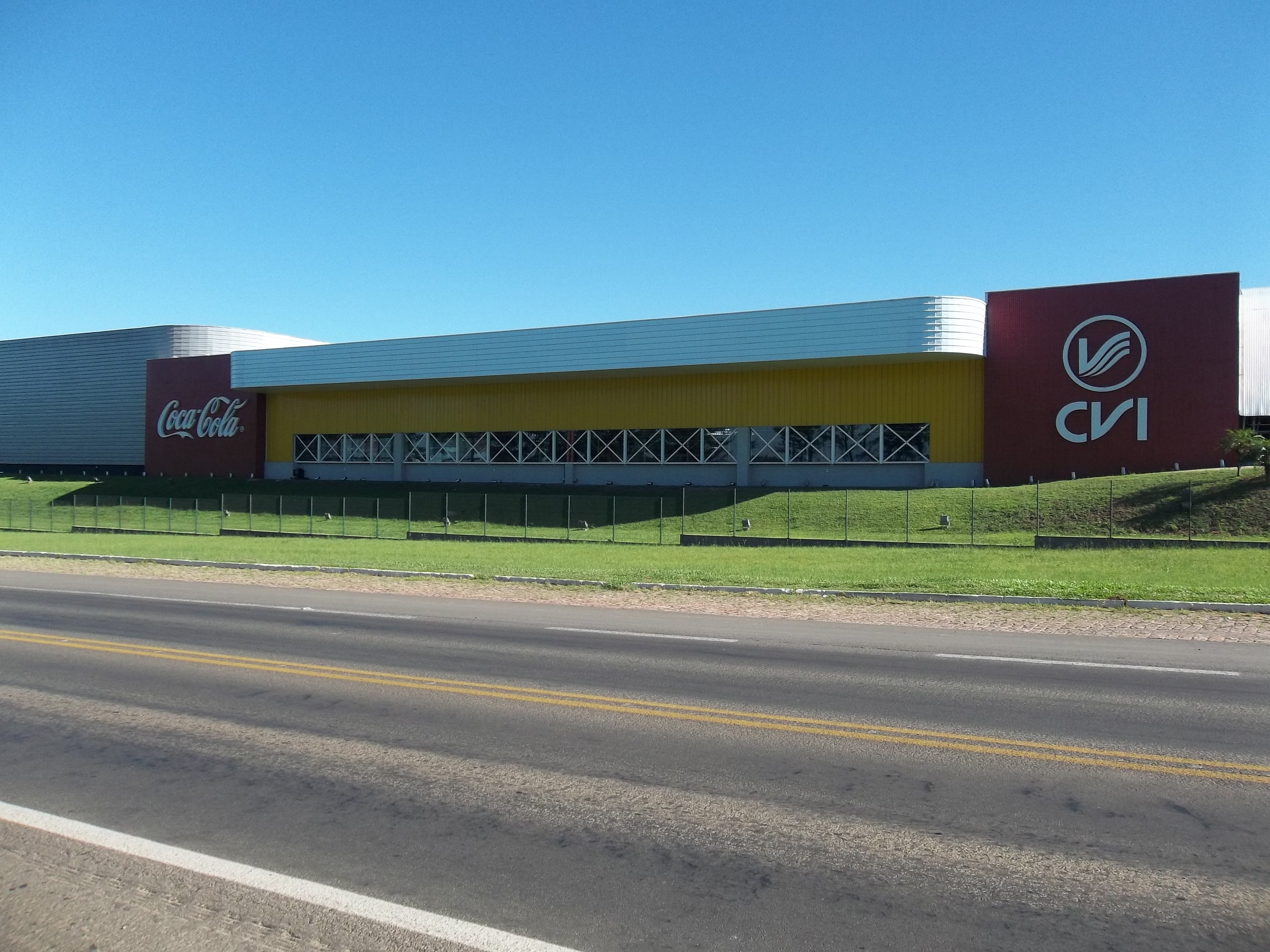

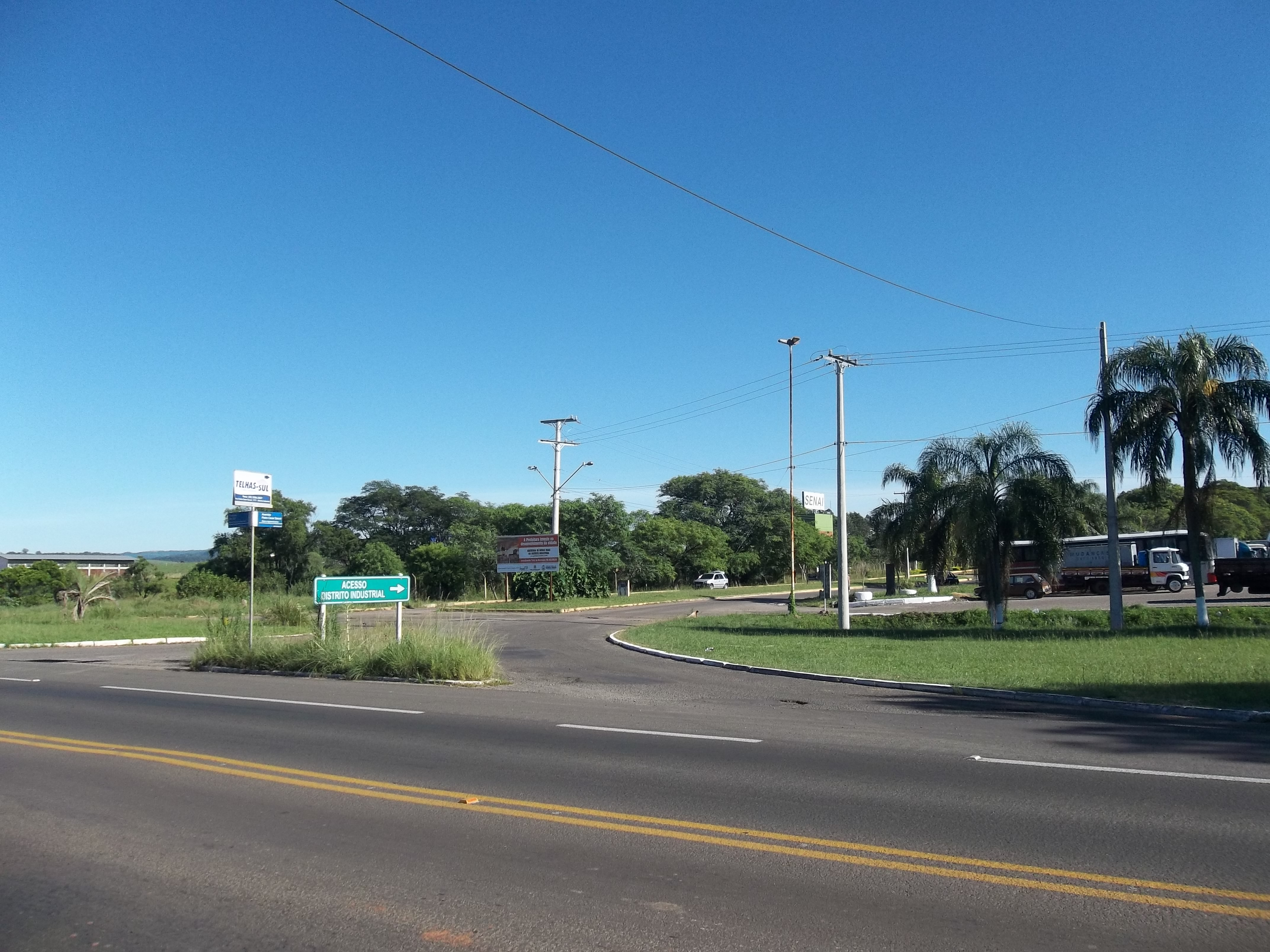
