= Boca do Monte =

- Bairro
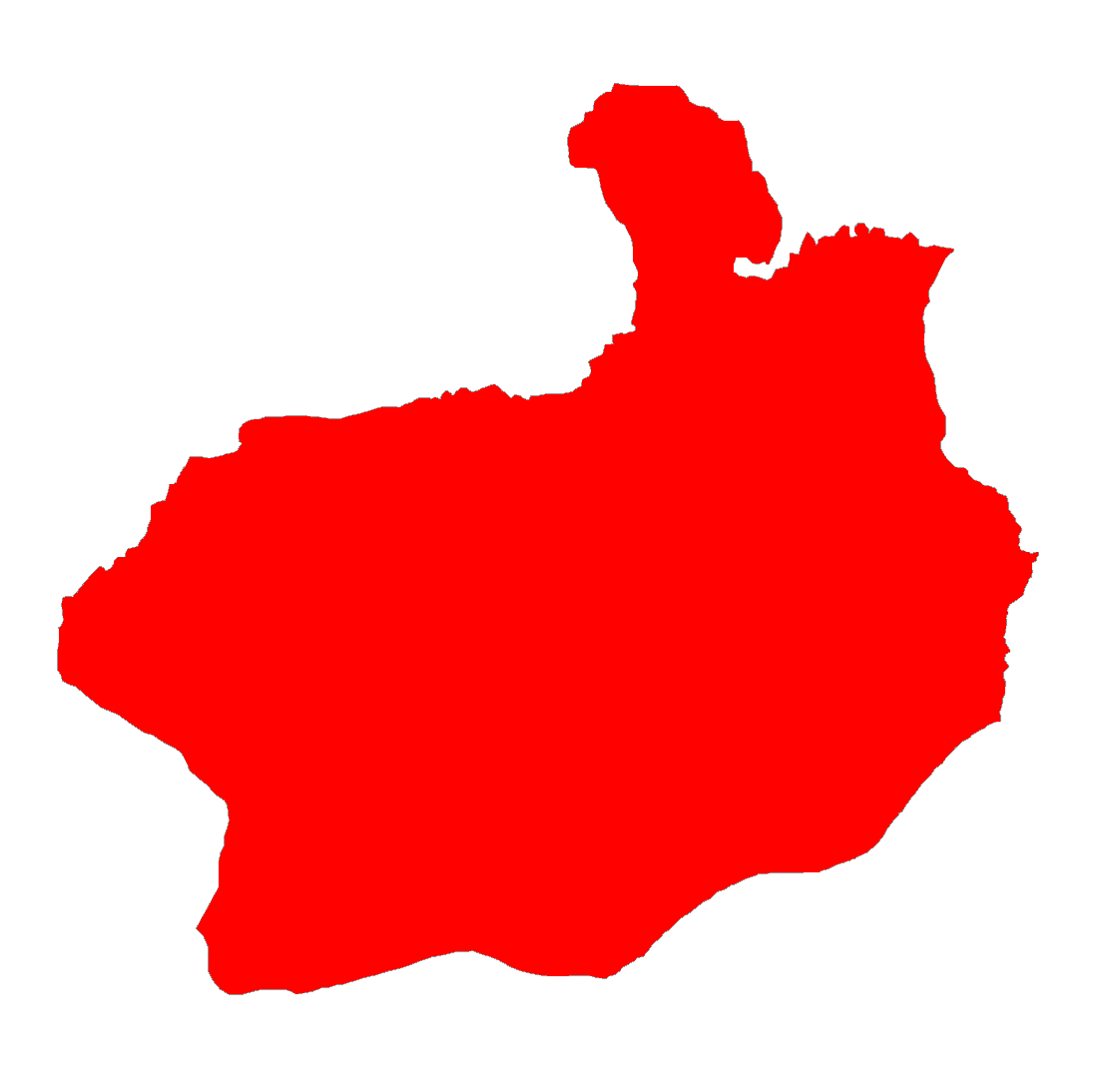
- The bairro in District of Boca do Monte

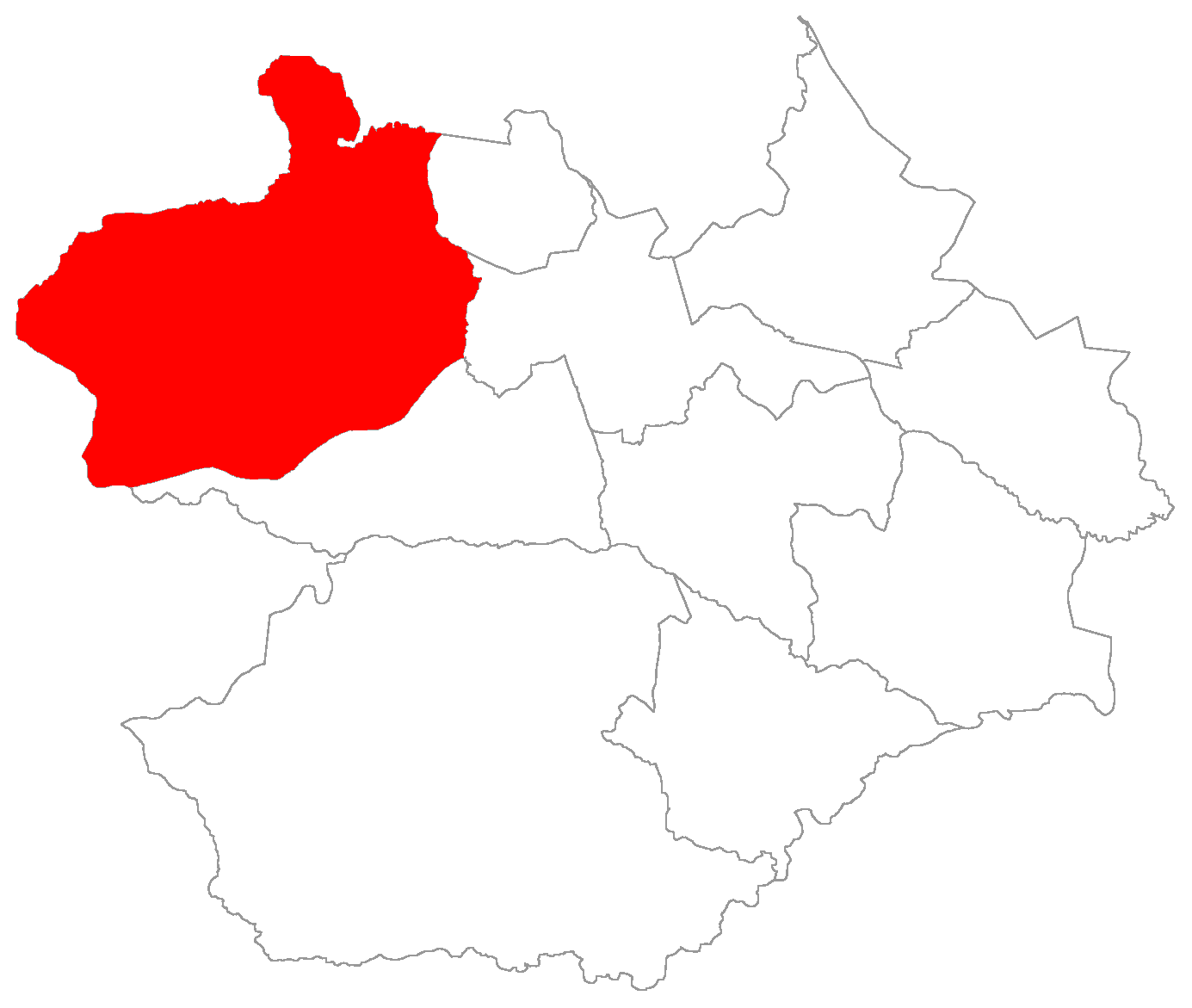
- District of Boca do Monte, in Santa Maria City, Rio Grande do Sul, Brazil
- Coordinates: 29°38′38.07″S 53°55′39.19″W
- Country: Brazil
- State: Rio Grande do Sul
- Municipality/City: Santa Maria
- District: District of Boca do Monte

Area
  - Total: 307.44 km^{2} (118.70 sq mi)

Population
  - Total: 2,941
  - Density: 9.566/km^{2} (24.78/sq mi)
- Postal code: 97.170-000
- Adjacent bairros: Agroindustrial, Boi Morto, Santo Antão, São Valentim, Tancredo Neves
- Website: Official site of Santa Maria

Boca do Monte ("mouth of the hill") is a bairro in the District of Boca do Monte in the municipality of Santa Maria, in the Brazilian state of Rio Grande do Sul. It is located in west Santa Maria.

== Villages ==
The bairro contains the following villages:Boca do Monte, Cabeceira do Raimundo, Caixa d'Água, Canabarro, Cezarpina, Colônia Pedro Stok, Corredor dos Pivetas, Durasnal, Estação Experimental de Silvicultura, Estância Velha, Filipinho, Lajeadinho, Parada Link, Passo da Ferreira, Picada dos Bastos, Quebra Dente, Quilombo das Vassouras, Rincão do Barroso, Rincão dos Flores, Santo Antônio, Vila Boca do Monte, Vila Esmeralda.
