= Pinheiro Machado, Santa Maria =

Pinheiro Machado
- Bairro
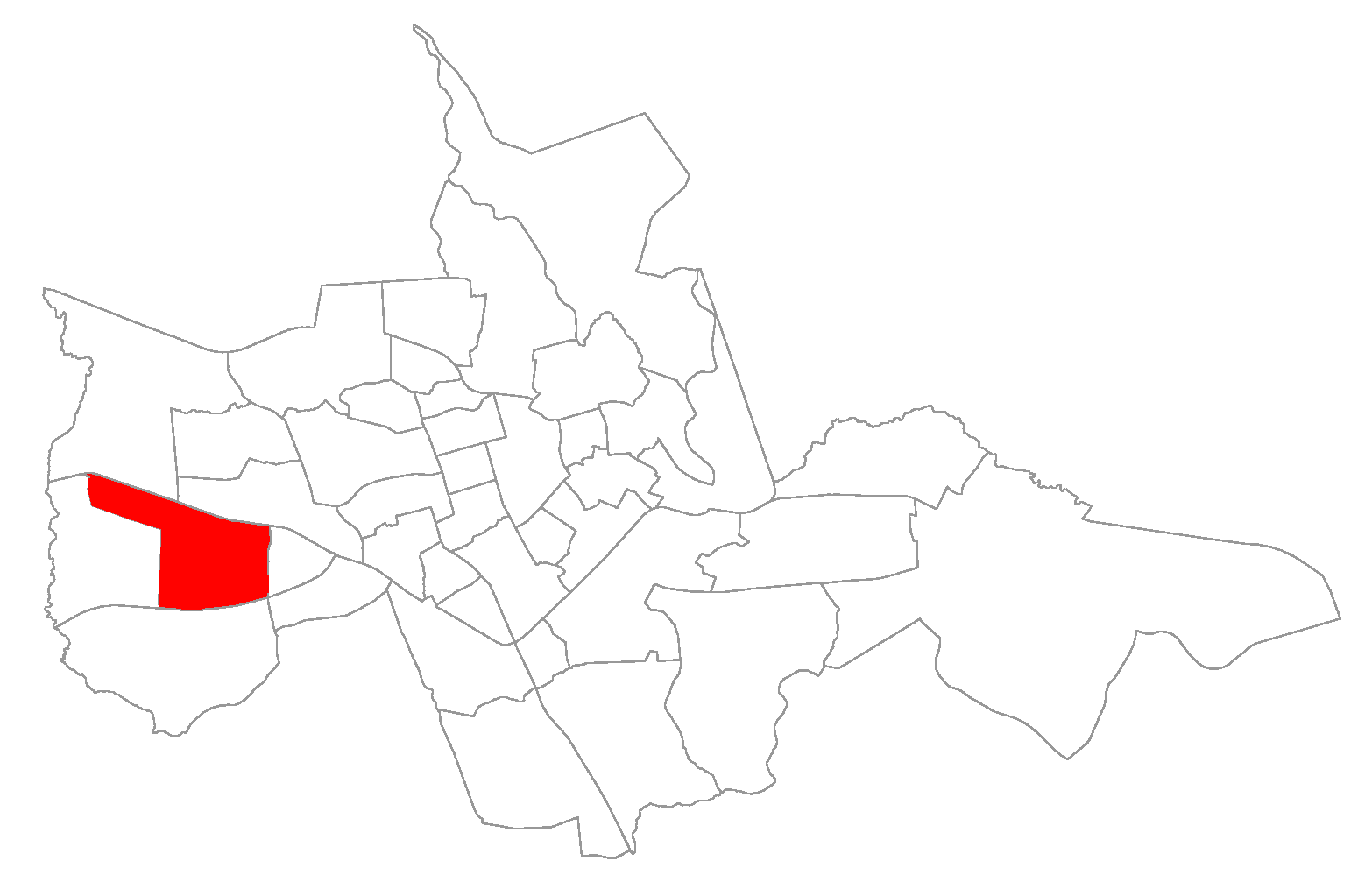
- The bairro in District of Sede

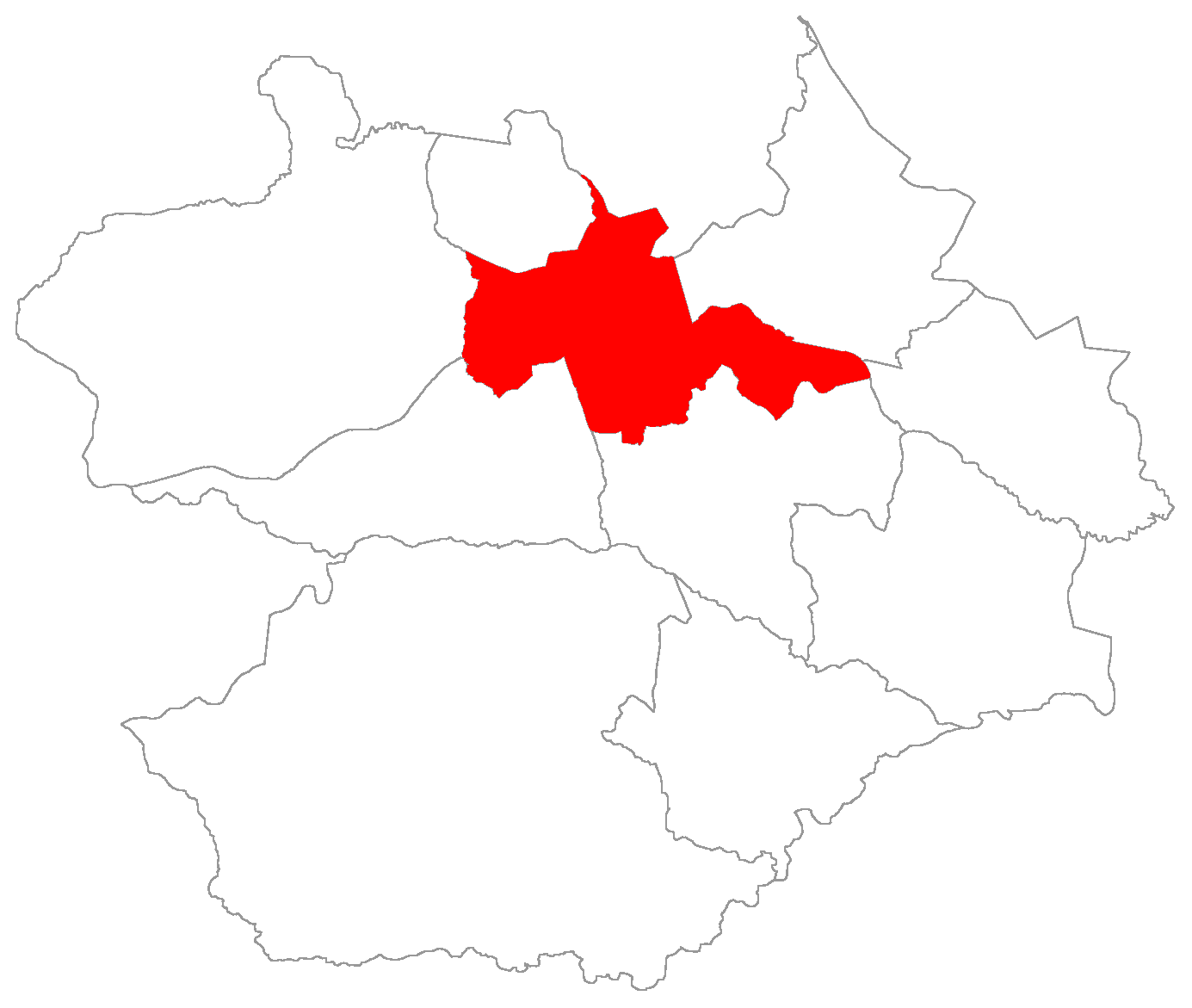
- District of Sede, in Santa Maria City, Rio Grande do Sul, Brazil
- Coordinates: 29°41′58.22″S 53°51′49.62″W
- Country: Brazil
- State: Rio Grande do Sul
- Municipality/City: Santa Maria
- District: District of Sede

Area
  - Total: 3.5728 km^{2} (1.3795 sq mi)

Population
  - Total: 10,943
  - Density: 3,062.9/km^{2} (7,932.8/sq mi)
- Postal code: 97.030-040 to 97.030-899
- Adjacent bairros: Agroindustrial, Boi Morto, Juscelino Kubitschek, Renascença, São João, Tancredo Neves.
- Website: Official site of Santa Maria

Pinheiro Machado ("José Gomes Pinheiro Machado - Brazilian politician") is a bairro in the District of Sede in the municipality of Santa Maria, in the Brazilian state of Rio Grande do Sul. It is located in west Santa Maria.

== Villages ==
The bairro contains the following villages: Loteamento Bela Vista, Parque Residencial Pinheiro Machado, Parque Residencial Lopes, Pinheiro Machado, Vila Ecologia, Vila Rossi, Vila São Serafim.

== Gallery of photos ==
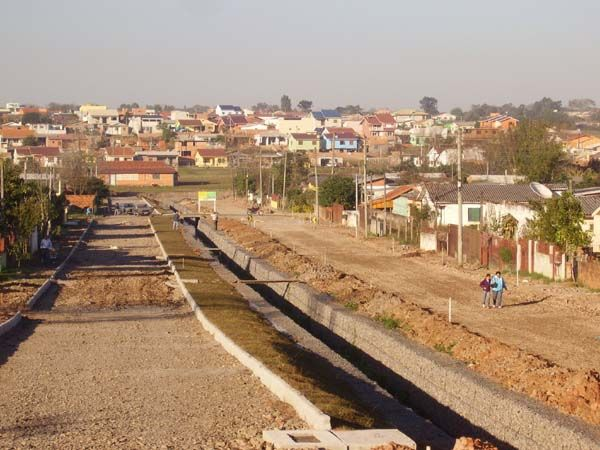

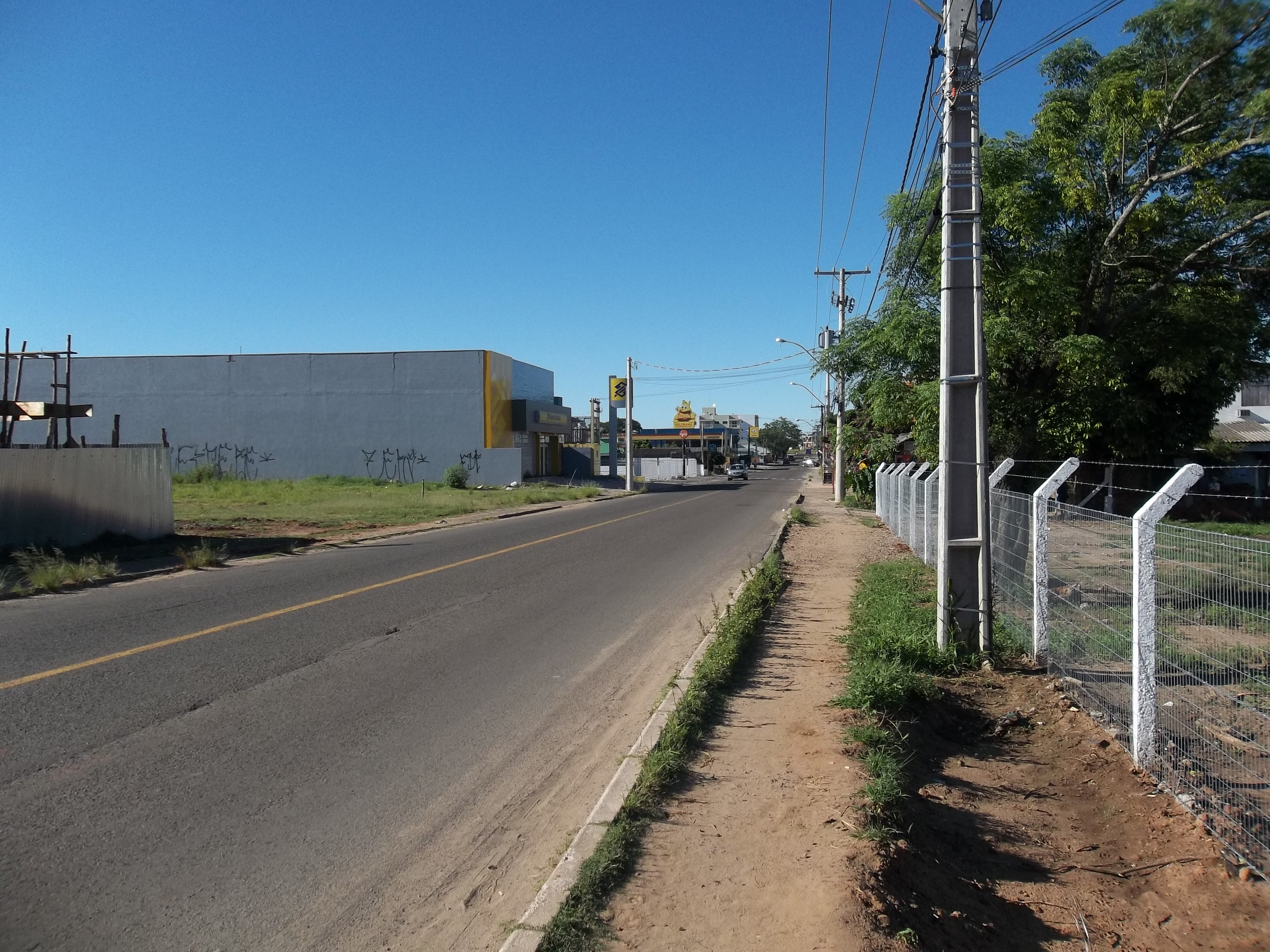
