= Duque de Caxias (disambiguation) =

Duque de Caxias may refer to:

- Luís Alves de Lima e Silva, Duke of Caxias (1803–1880), patron of the Brazilian Army; namesake for the following:
  - Duque de Caxias, Rio de Janeiro, a city in the state of Rio de Janeiro in southeastern Brazil
  - Duque de Caxias (U-11), a Brazilian Navy transport ship; the former USS Orizaba
  - Brazilian landing ship Duque de Caxias (G26)
  - Duque de Caxias Futebol Clube, a Brazilian football team
  - Esporte Clube Tigres do Brasil of Duque de Caxias
  - Duque de Caxias, Santa Maria
  - CEPE-Caxias
