= Pains, Santa Maria =

Pains
- Bairro
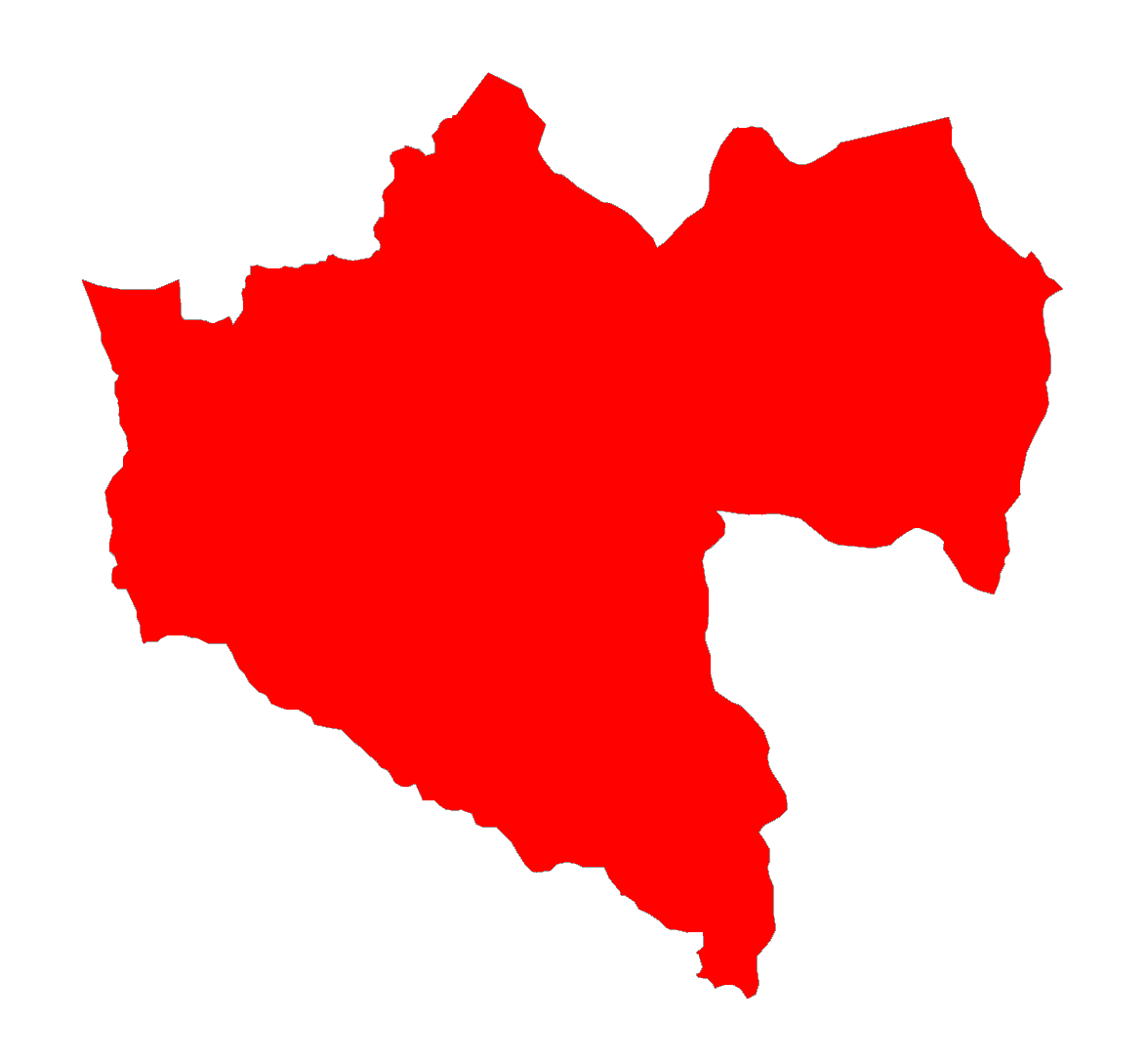
- The bairro in District of Pains

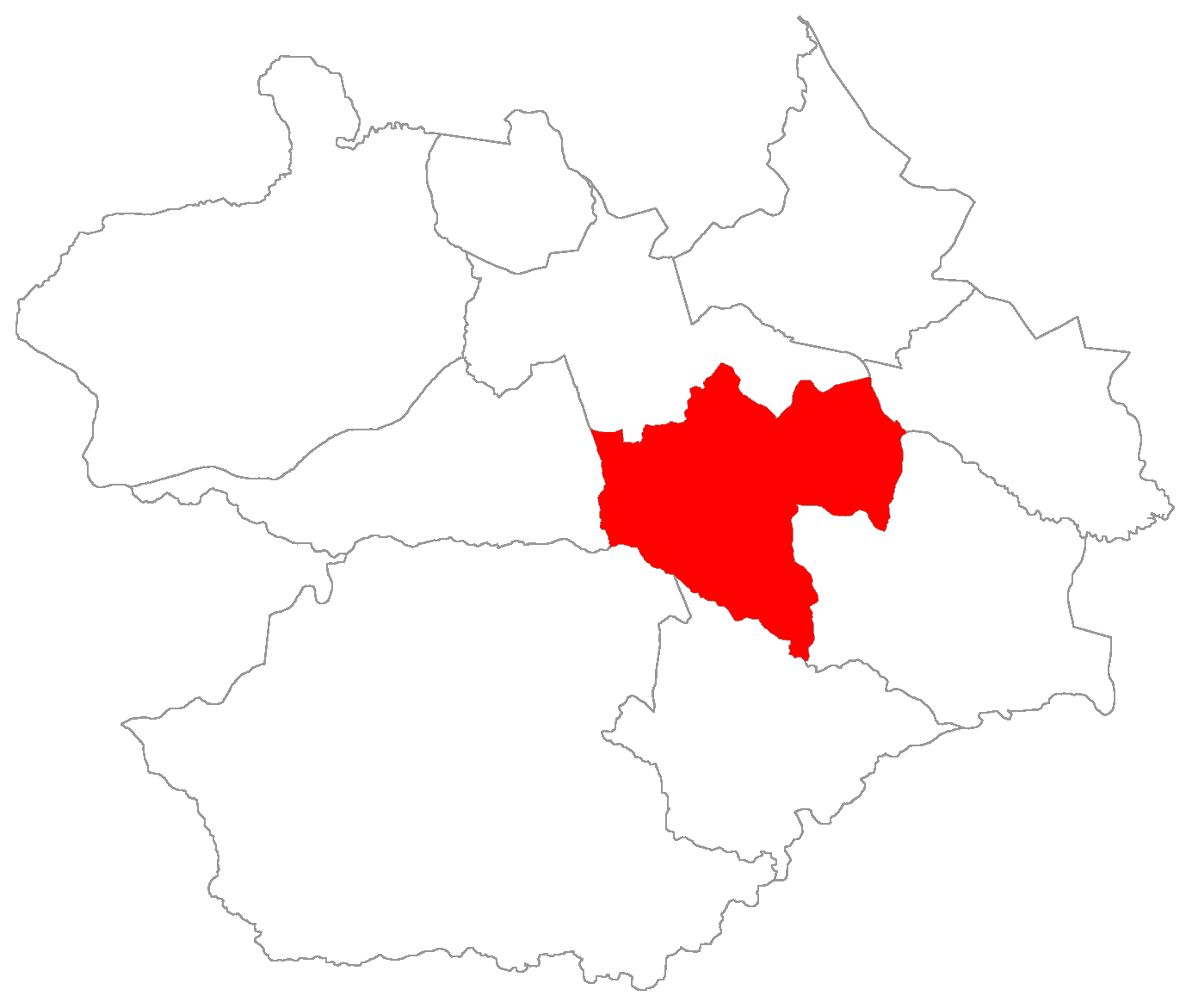
- District of Pains, in Santa Maria City, Rio Grande do Sul, Brazil
- Coordinates: 29°45′02.18″S 53°42′17.32″W
- Country: Brazil
- State: Rio Grande do Sul
- Municipality/City: Santa Maria
- District: District of Pains

Area
  - Total: 133.61 km^{2} (51.59 sq mi)

Population
  - Total: 4,146
  - Density: 31.03/km^{2} (80.37/sq mi)
- Postal code: 97.140-000
- Adjacent bairros: Arroio do Só, Camobi, Diácono João Luiz Pozzobon, Lorenzi, Palma, Passo do Verde, Santa Flora, São Valentim, Tomazetti
- Website: Official site of Santa Maria

Pains is a bairro in the District of Pains in the municipality of Santa Maria, in the Brazilian state of Rio Grande do Sul. It is located in southeast Santa Maria.

== Villages ==
The bairro contains the following villages: Pains, São Sebastião, Passo das Topas, Vila Abrantes, Vila Videira, Vila Marques, Sítio dos Paines, São Geraldo.

== Gallery of photos ==
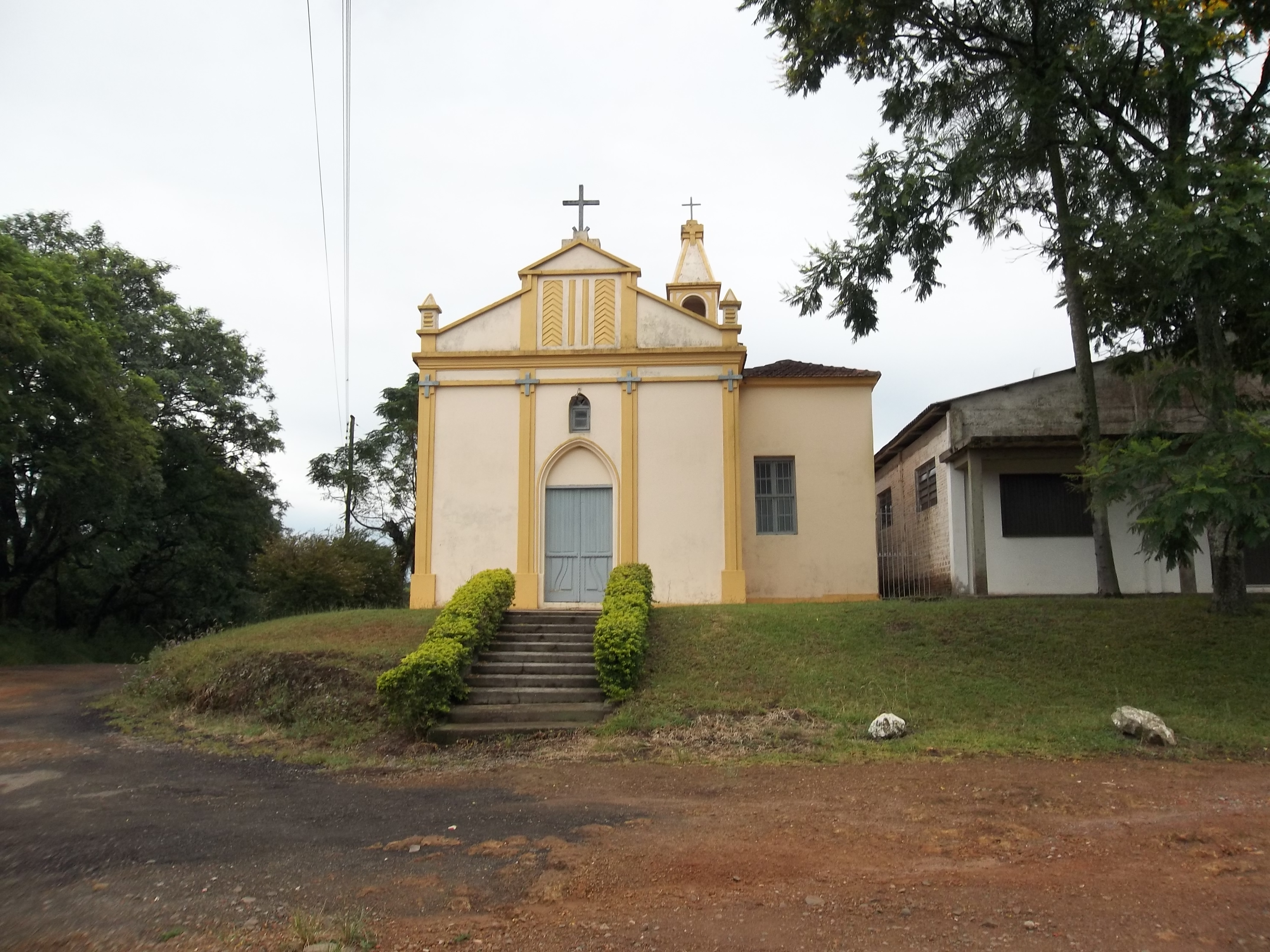

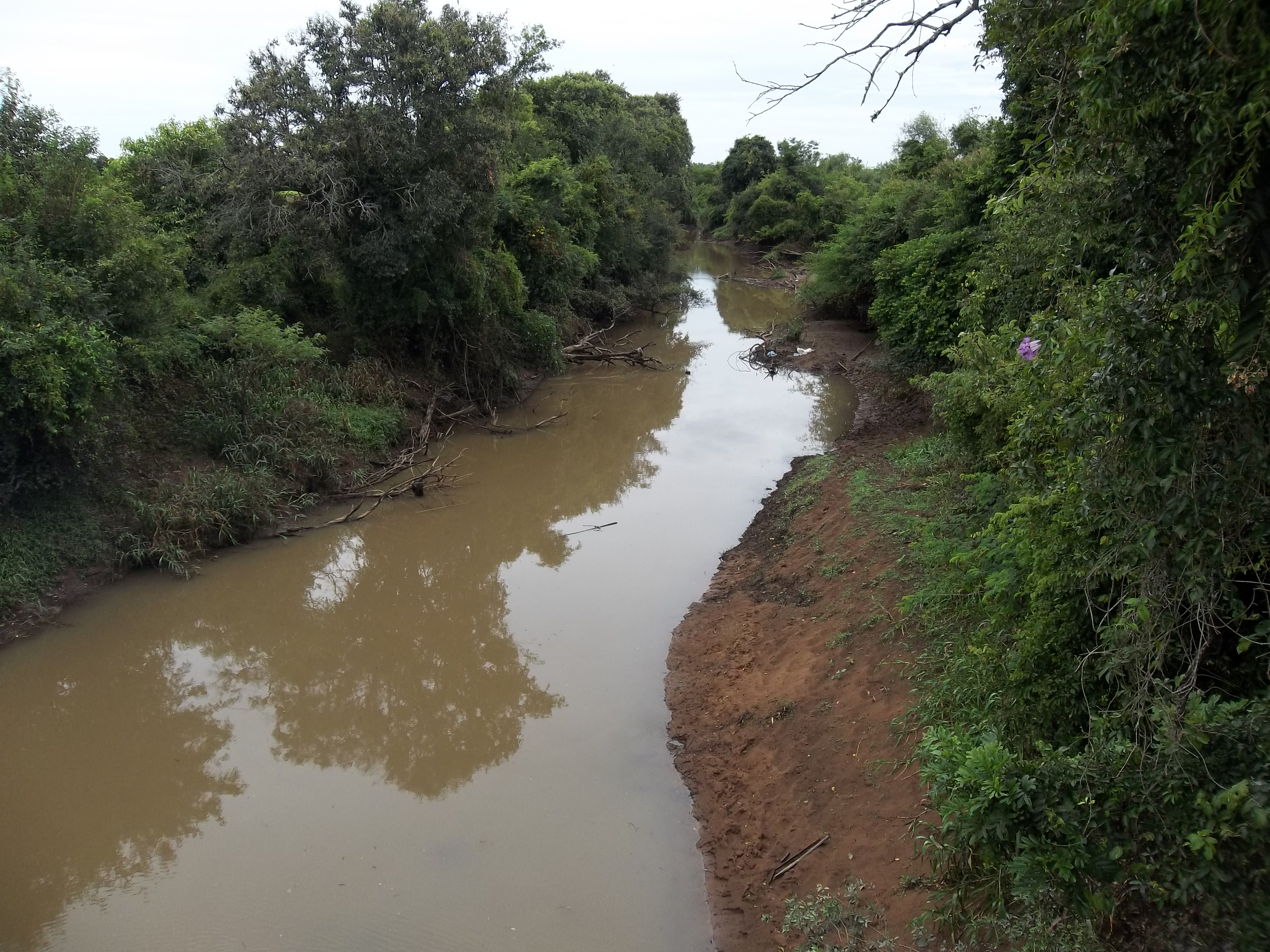
