= Nossa Senhora Medianeira =

- Bairro
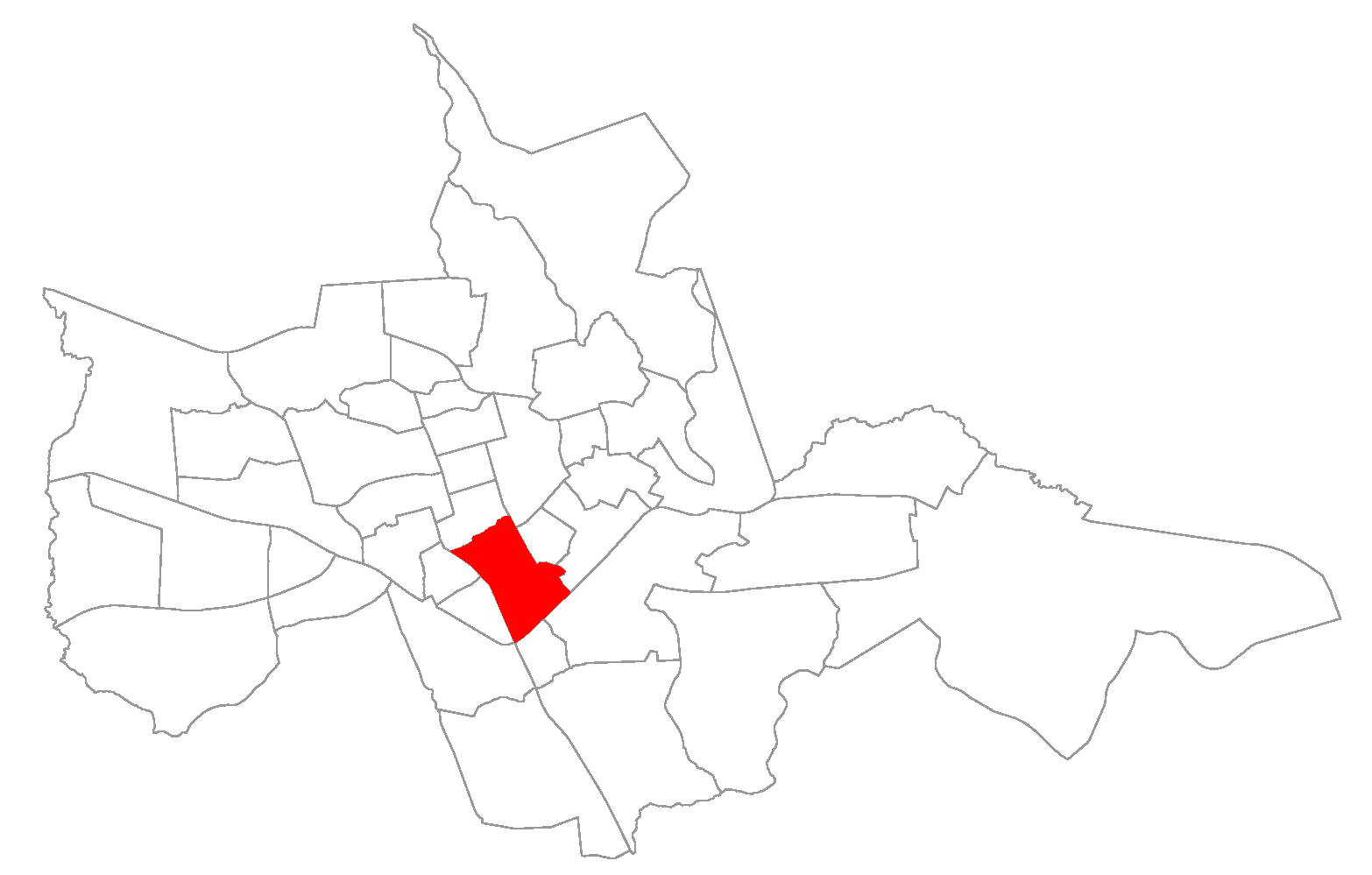
- The bairro in District of Sede

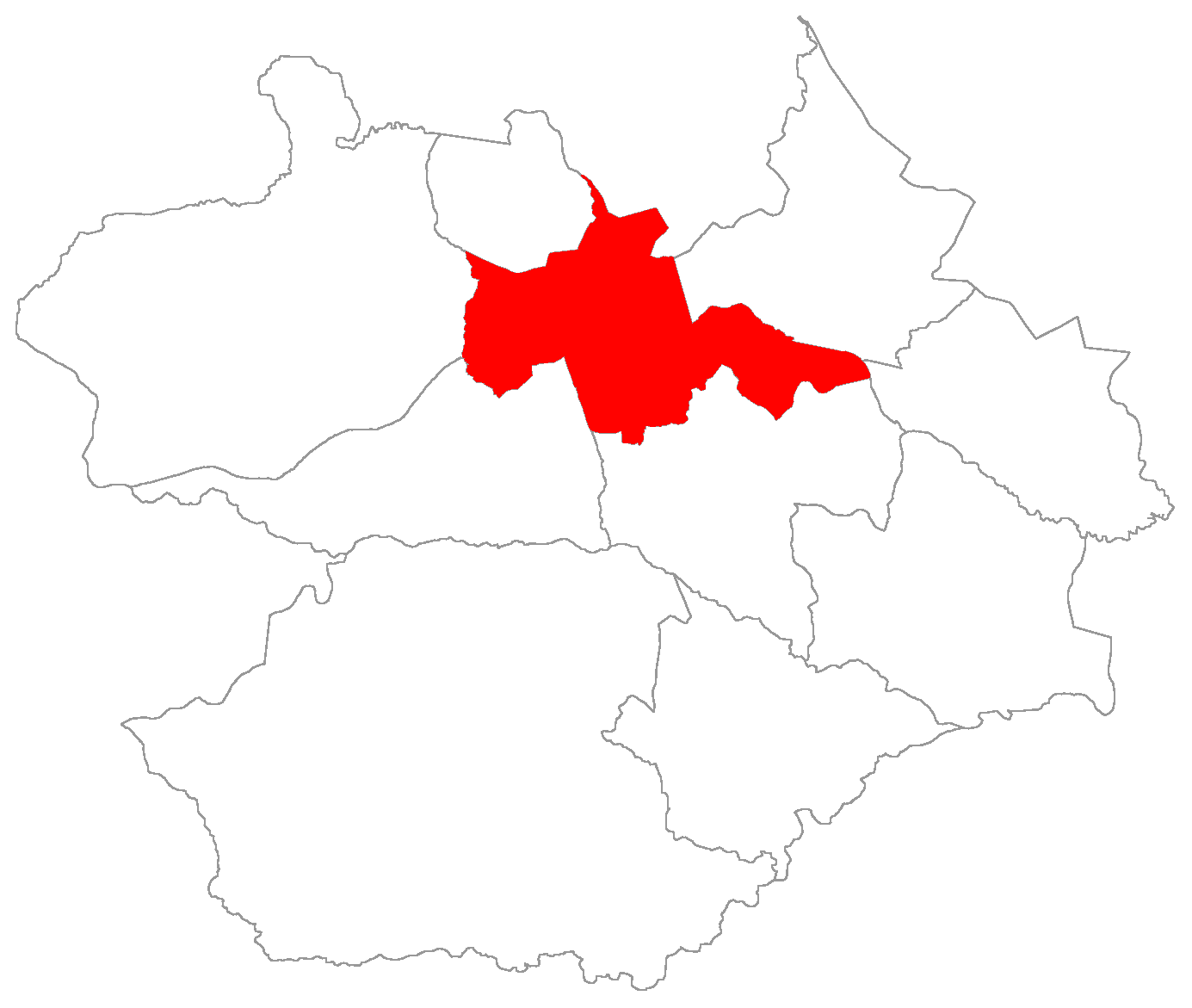
- District of Sede, in Santa Maria City, Rio Grande do Sul, Brazil
- Coordinates: 29°42′20.56″S 53°48′32.58″W
- Country: Brazil
- State: Rio Grande do Sul
- Municipality/City: Santa Maria
- District: District of Sede

Area
  - Total: 1.8750 km^{2} (0.7239 sq mi)

Population
  - Total: 9,030
  - Density: 4,820/km^{2} (12,500/sq mi)
- Postal code: 97.015-050 to 97.070-359
- Adjacent bairros: Centro, Cerrito, Dom Antônio Reis, Duque de Caxias, Nonoai, Nossa Senhora de Fátima, Nossa Senhora de Lourdes, Uglione, Urlândia.
- Website: Official site of Santa Maria

Nossa Senhora Medianeira ("Mediatrix of all graces") is a bairro in the District of Sede in the municipality of Santa Maria, in the Brazilian state of Rio Grande do Sul. It is located in central Santa Maria.

== Villages ==
The bairro contains the following villages: Condomínio Madre Paulina, Medianeira, Vila Bazzégio, Vila Cândida Vargas, Vila Esperança, Vila Imembuí, Vila Mariana, Vila Medianeira.

== Gallery of photos ==
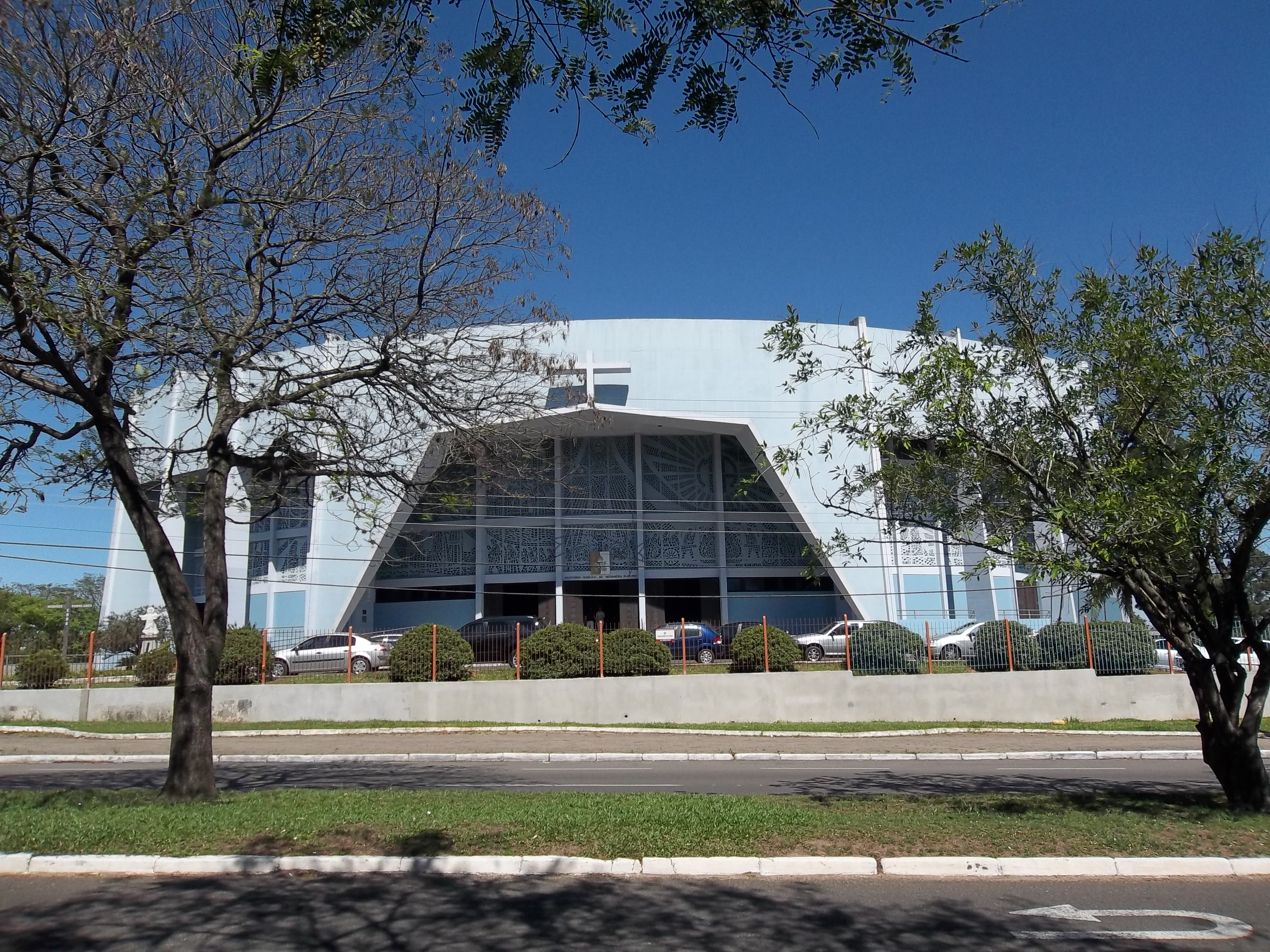
