= Lorenzi, Santa Maria =

Lorenzi
- Bairro
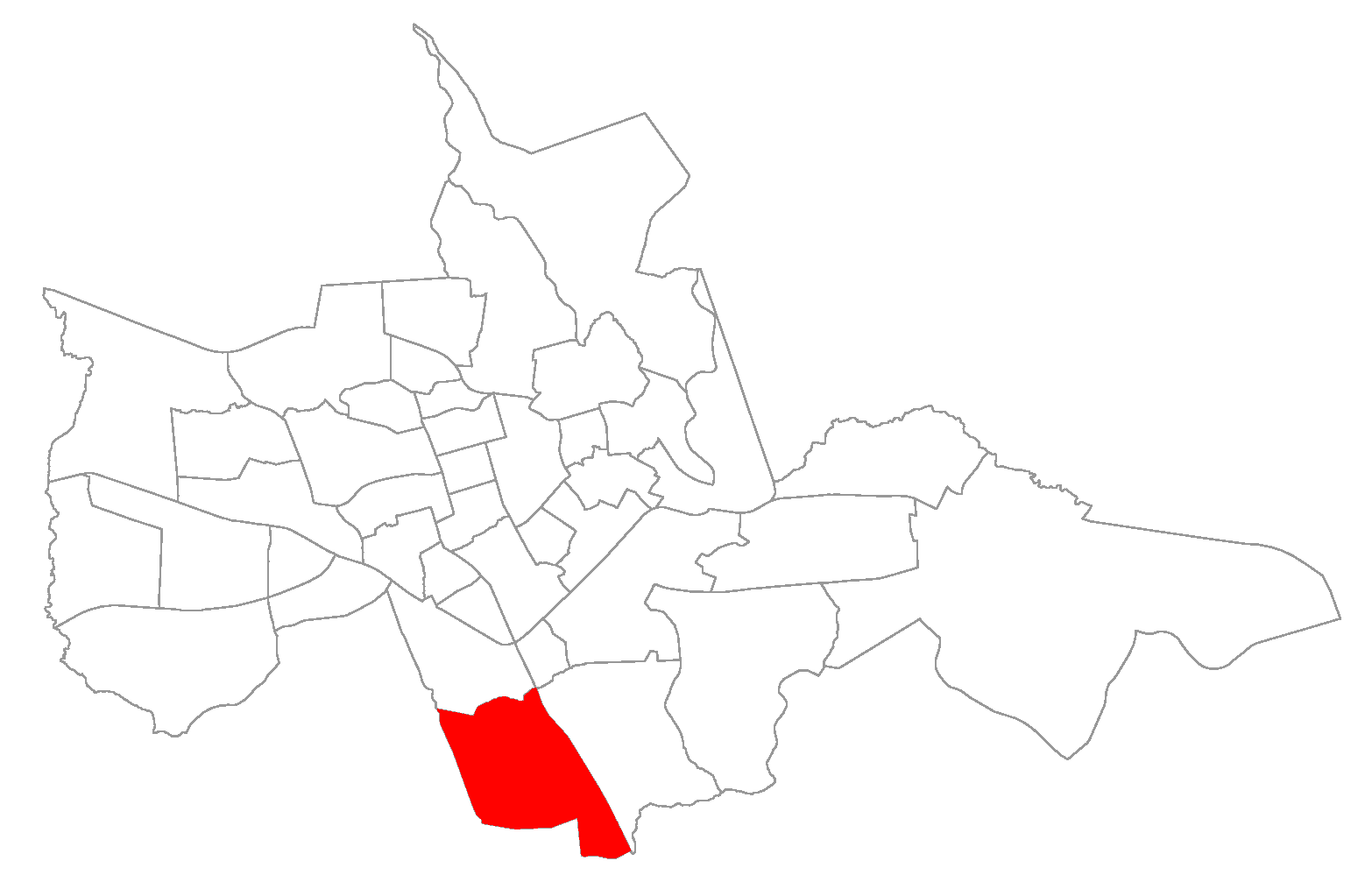
- The bairro in District of Sede

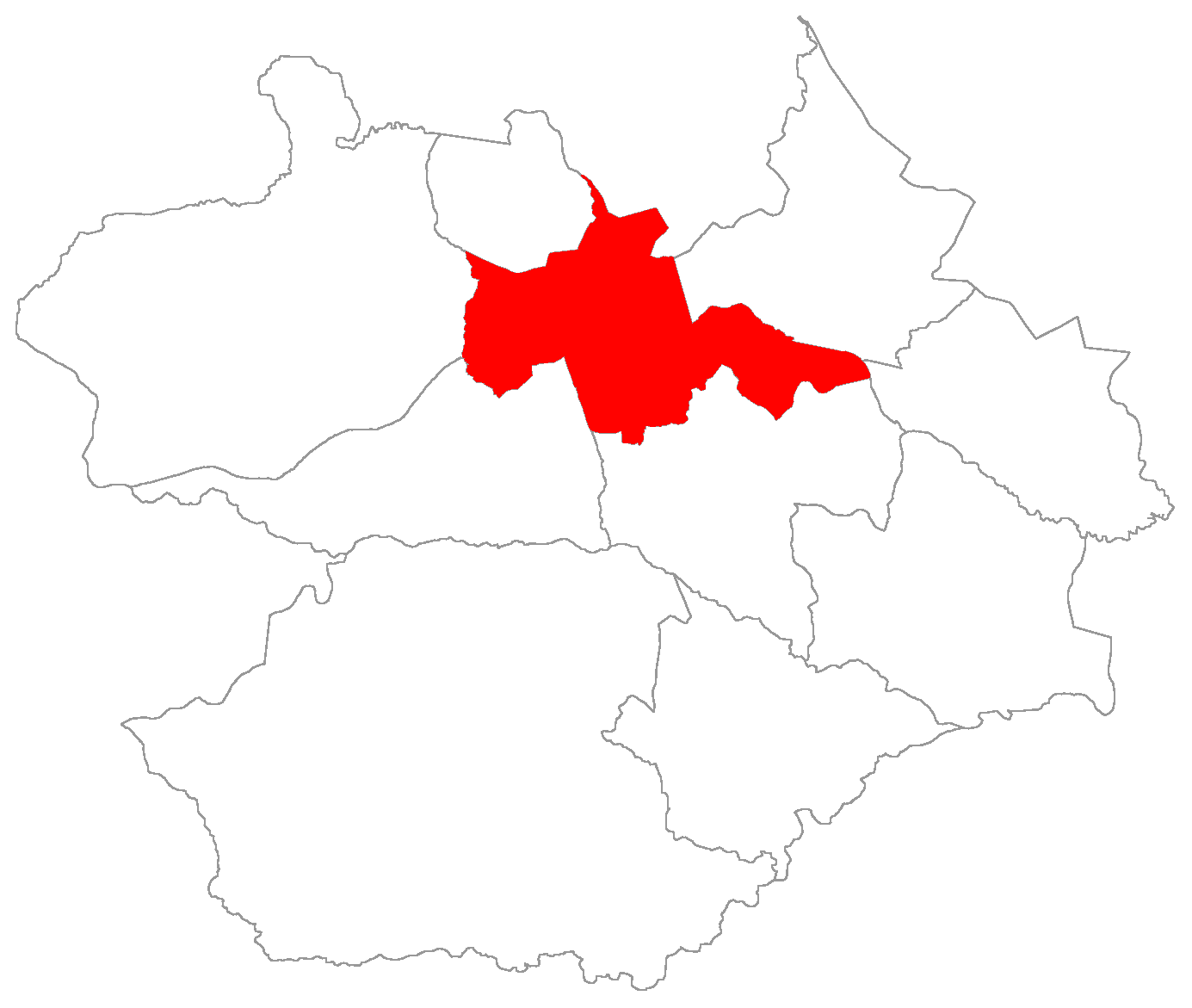
- District of Sede, in Santa Maria City, Rio Grande do Sul, Brazil
- Coordinates: 29°44′06.49″S 53°48′33.80″W
- Country: Brazil
- State: Rio Grande do Sul
- Municipality/City: Santa Maria
- District: District of Sede

Area
  - Total: 4.7421 km^{2} (1.8309 sq mi)

Population
  - Total: 5,621
  - Density: 1,185/km^{2} (3,070/sq mi)
- Postal code: 97.070-010 to 97.070-769
- Adjacent bairros: Dom Antônio Reis, Pains, São Valentim, Tomazetti, Urlândia.
- Website: Official site of Santa Maria

Lorenzi (Portuguese pronunciation: [????], "Lorenzi - an Italian family name") is a bairro in the District of Sede in the municipality of Santa Maria, in the Brazilian state of Rio Grande do Sul. It is located in south Santa Maria.

== Villages ==
The bairro contains the following villages: Estância do Minuano, Lorenzi, Vila Bom Jesus, Vila Lorenzi, Vila Quitandinha, Vila Santa Rita de Cássia, Vila Santo Antônio, Vila Severo, Vila Tavares.
