= Diácono João Luiz Pozzobon =

- Bairro
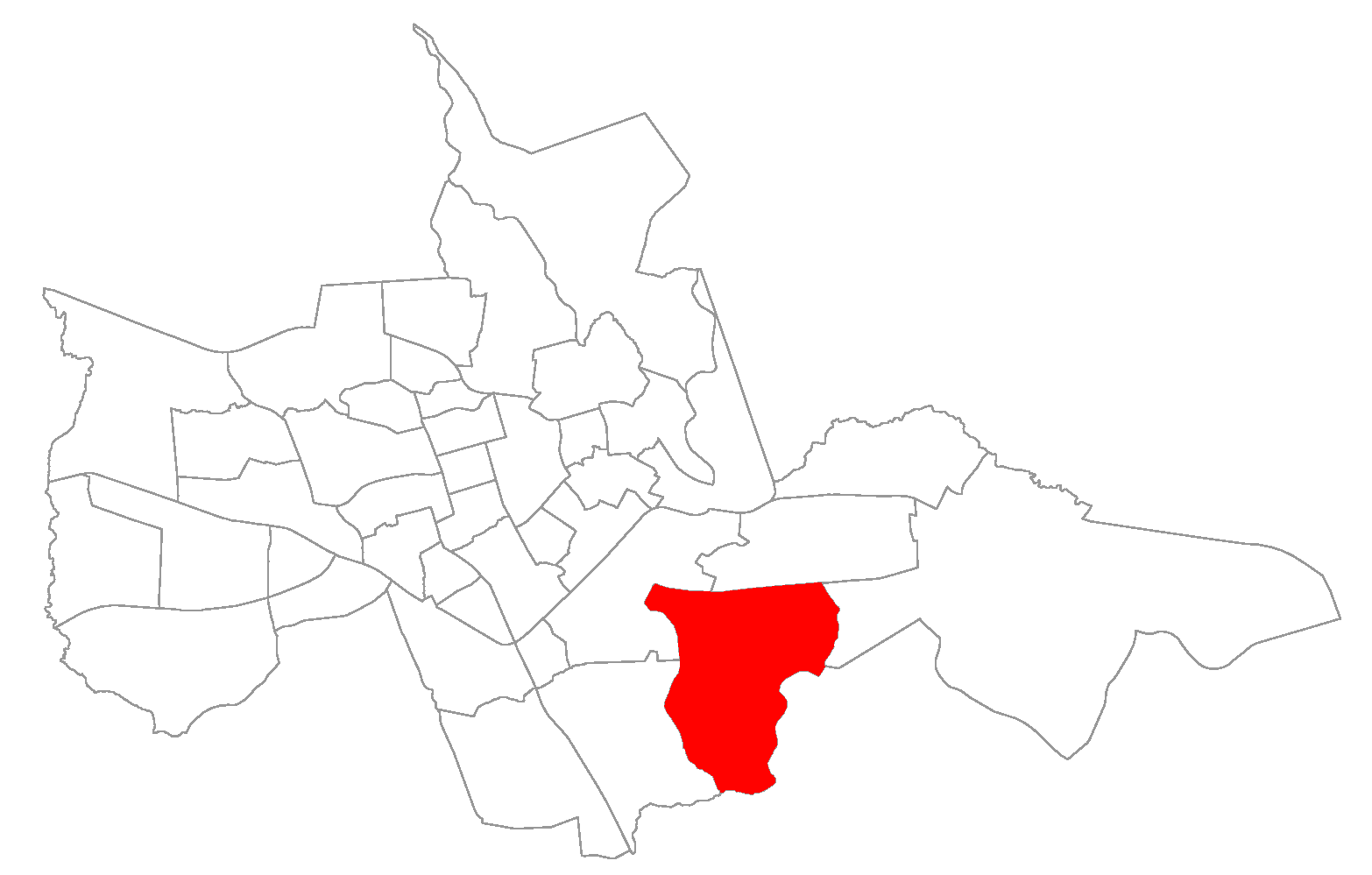
- The bairro in District of Sede

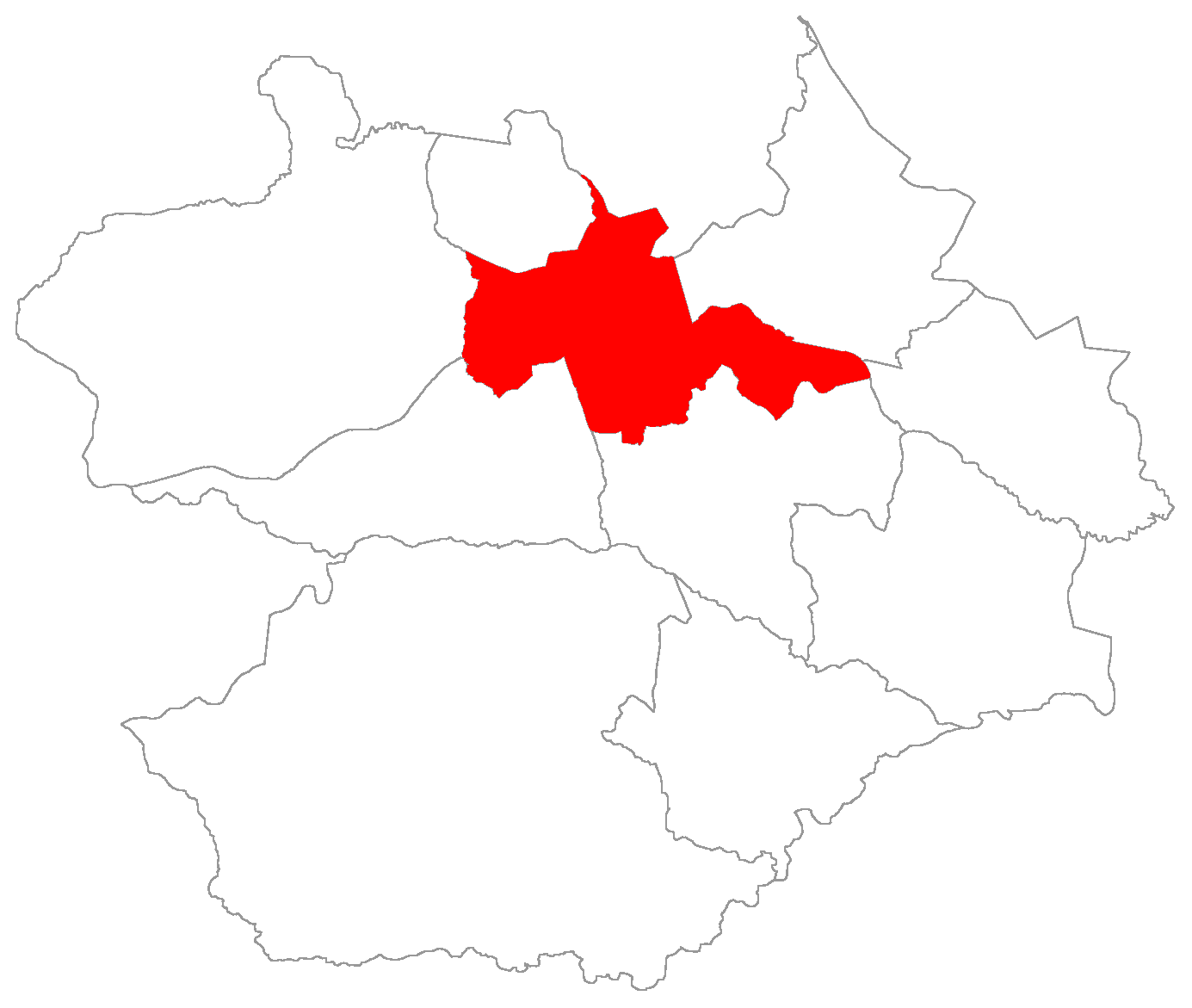
- District of Sede, in Santa Maria City, Rio Grande do Sul, Brazil
- Coordinates: 29°43′15.19″S 53°46′11.65″W
- Country: Brazil
- State: Rio Grande do Sul
- Municipality/City: Santa Maria
- District: District of Sede

Area
  - Total: 7.0884 km^{2} (2.7368 sq mi)

Population
  - Total: 3,152
  - Density: 444.7/km^{2} (1,152/sq mi)
- Postal code: 97.060-475 to 97.065-349
- Adjacent bairros: Camobi, Cerrito, Pains, São José, Tomazetti.
- Website: Official site of Santa Maria

Diácono João Luiz Pozzobon ("deacon João Luiz Pozzobon - Brazilian deacon") is a bairro in the District of Sede in the municipality of Santa Maria, in the Brazilian state of Rio Grande do Sul. It is located in east Santa Maria.

== Villages ==
The bairro contains the following villages: Conjunto Residencial Diácono João Luiz Pozzobon, Jardim Berleze, João Luiz Pozzobon, Loteamento Paróquia das Dores, Vila Cerrito, Vila Maringá.

== Gallery of photos ==
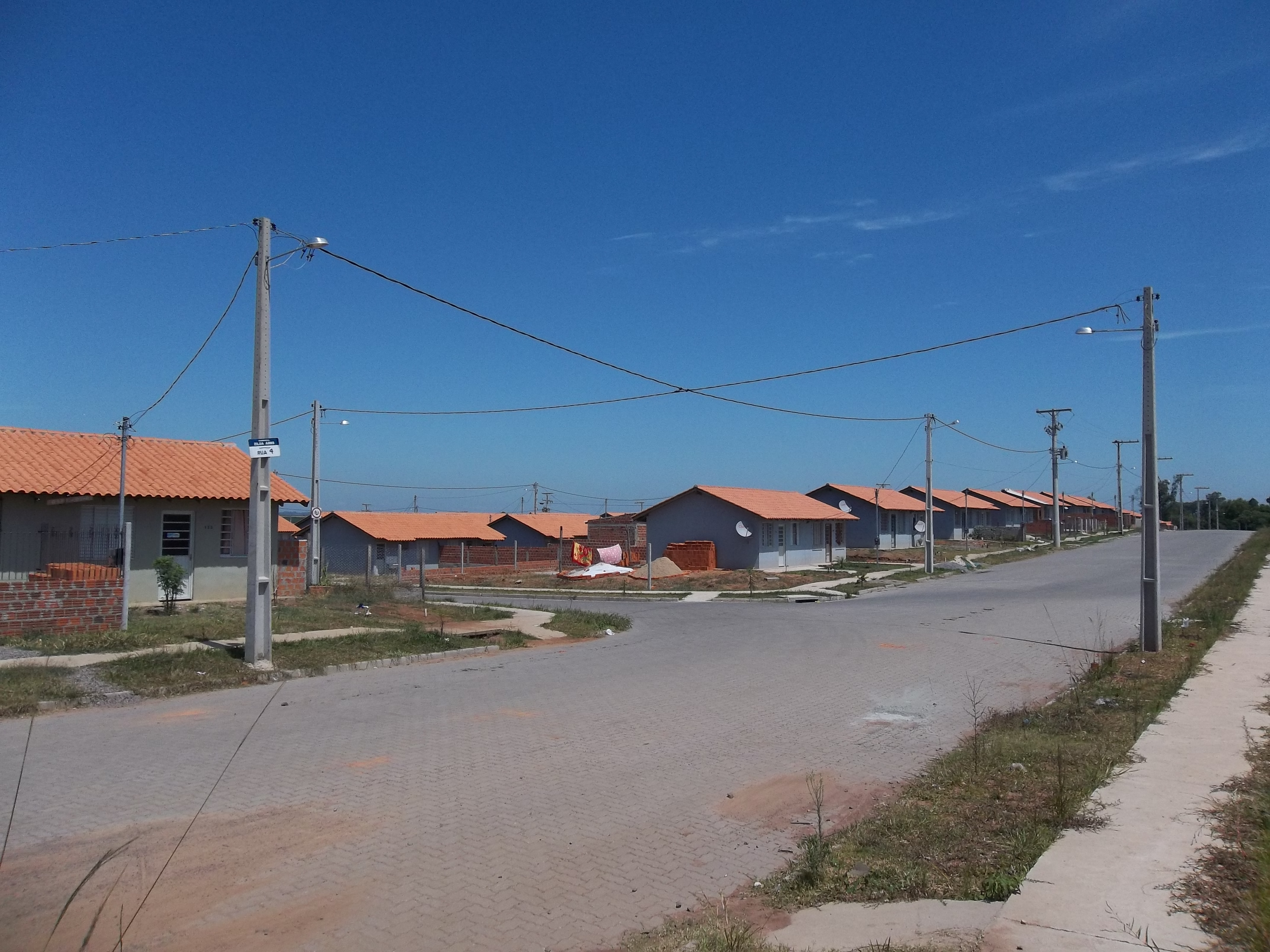

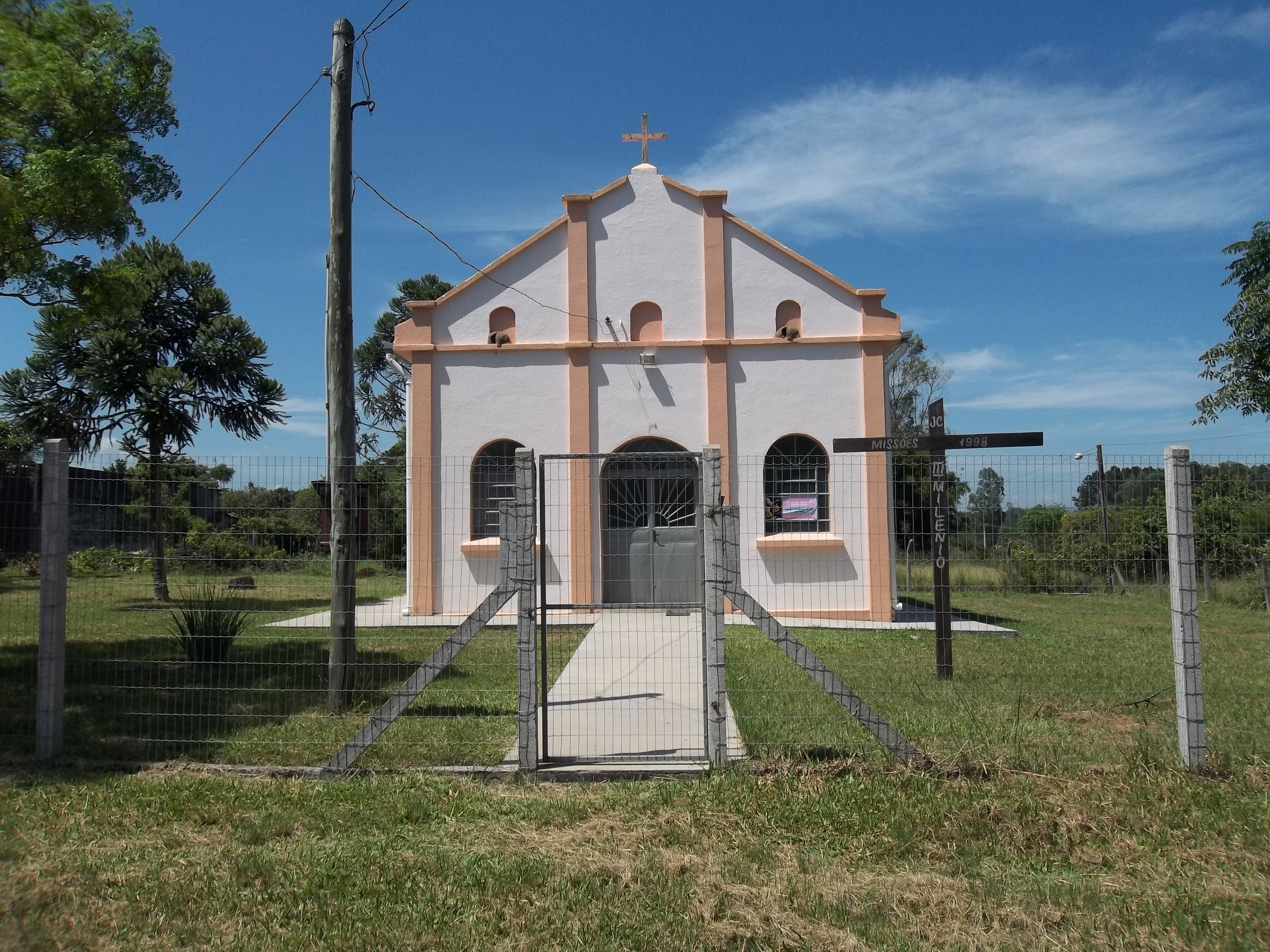

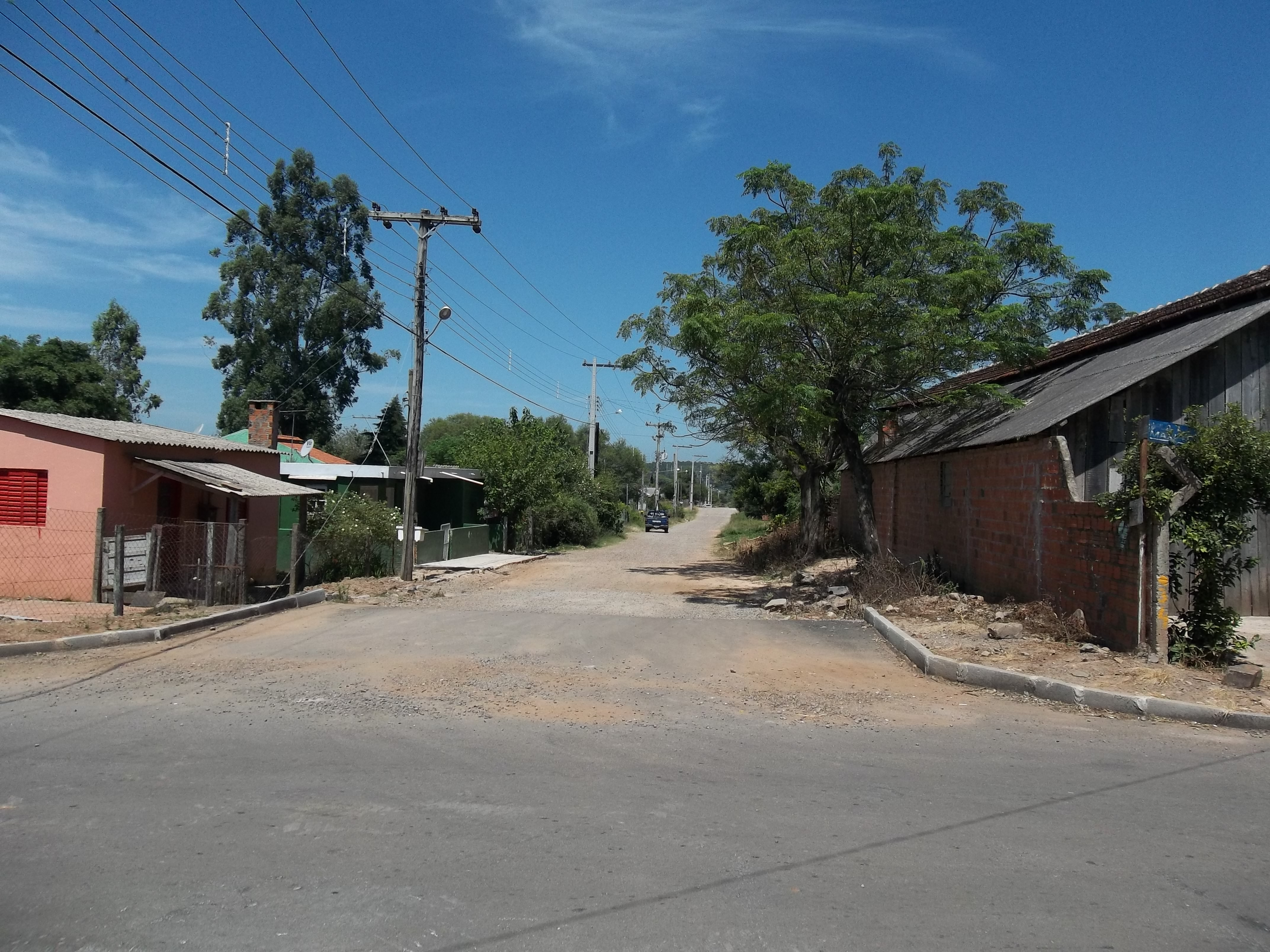

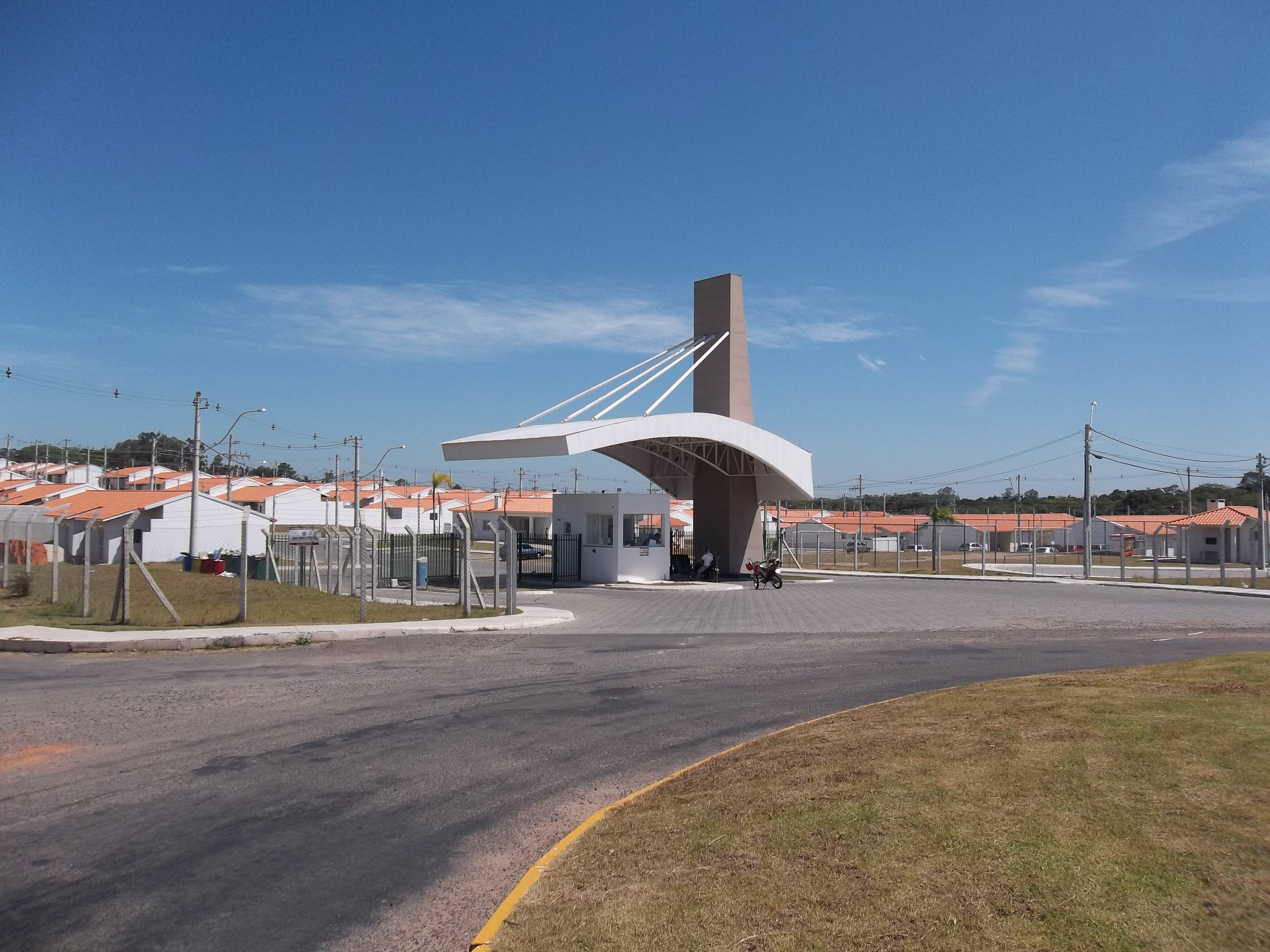

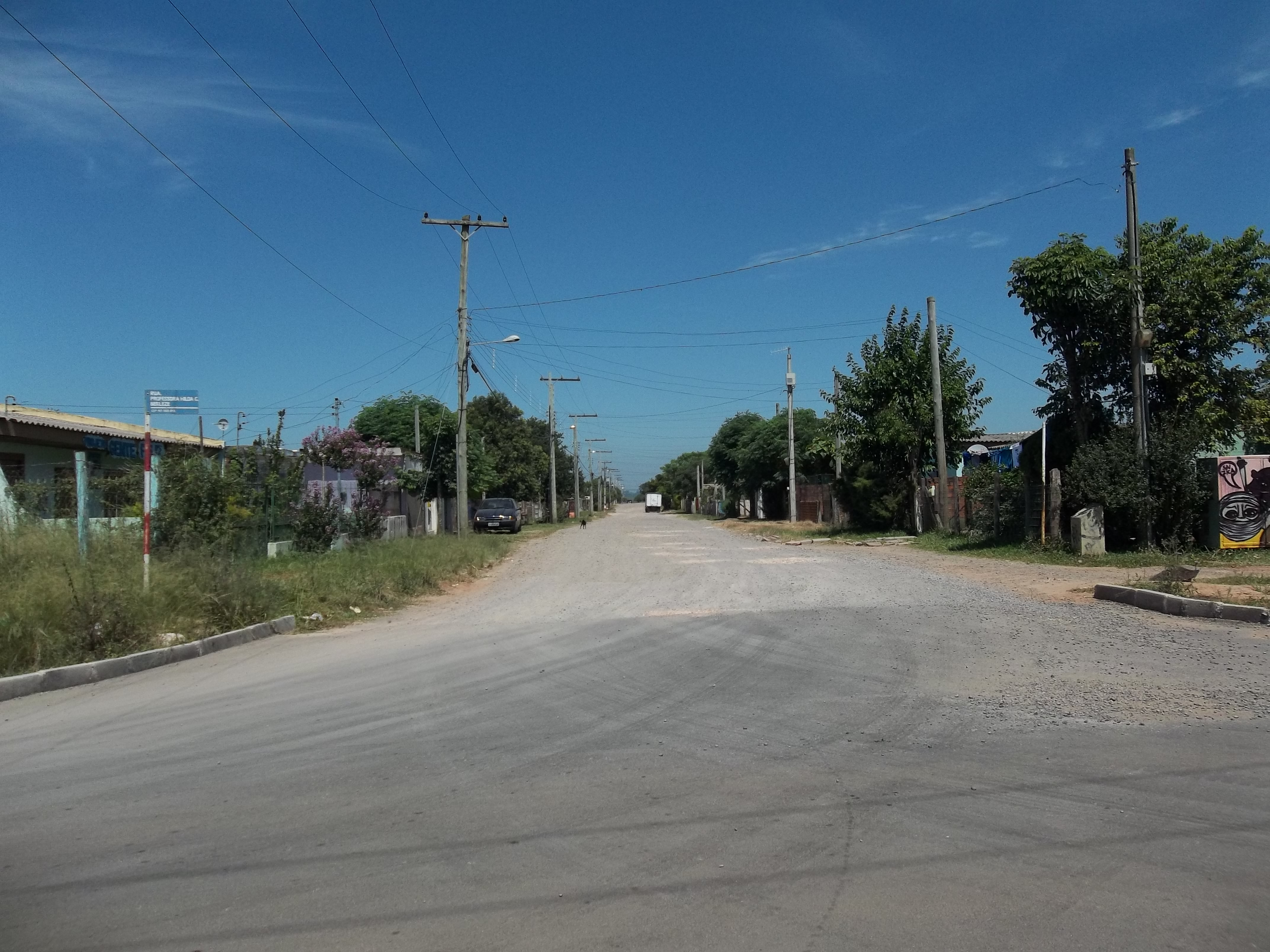
