= Cerrito, Santa Maria =

Cerrito
- Bairro
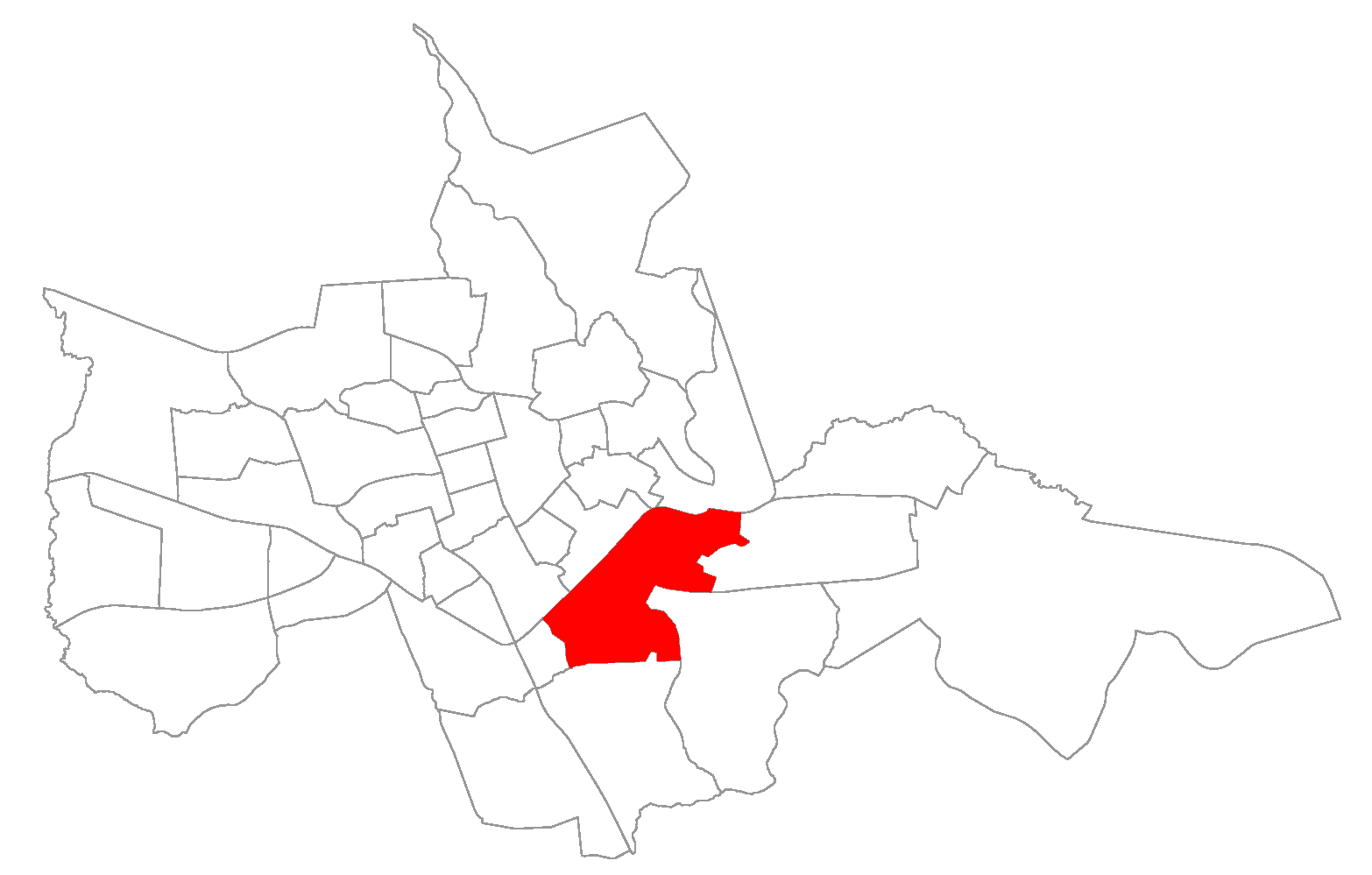
- The bairro in District of Sede

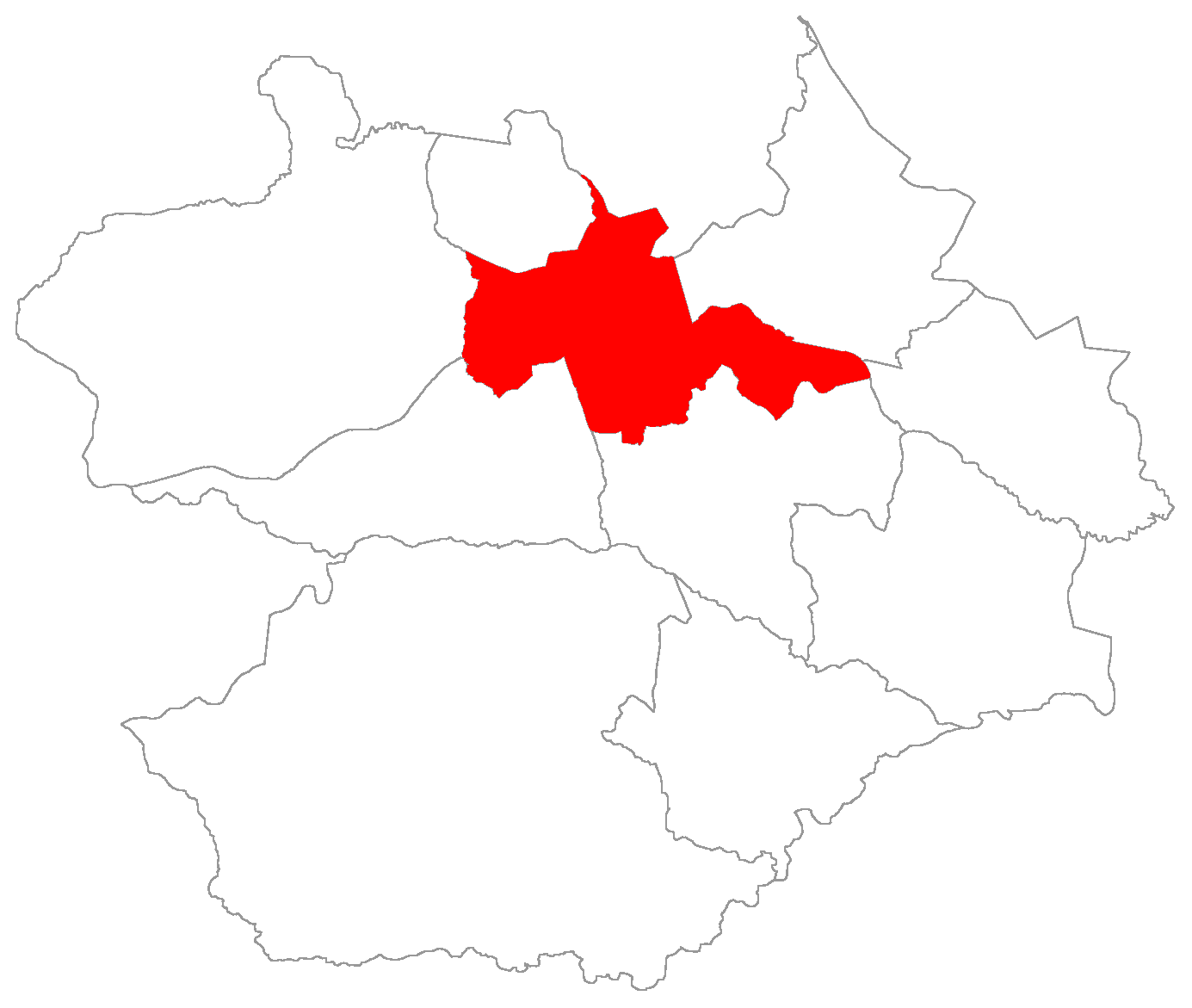
- District of Sede, in Santa Maria City, Rio Grande do Sul, Brazil
- Coordinates: 29°42′15.97″S 53°47′26.38″W
- Country: Brazil
- State: Rio Grande do Sul
- Municipality/City: Santa Maria
- District: District of Sede

Area
  - Total: 4.7427 km^{2} (1.8312 sq mi)

Population
  - Total: 1,127
  - Density: 237.6/km^{2} (615.5/sq mi)
- Postal code: 97.060-090 to 97.095-669
- Adjacent bairros: Dom Antônio Reis, Diácono João Luiz Pozzobon, Km 3, Nossa Senhora das Dores, Nossa Senhora de Lourdes, Nossa Senhora Medianeira, São José, Tomazetti.
- Website: Official site of Santa Maria

Cerrito ("small hill") is a bairro in the District of Sede in the municipality of Santa Maria, in the Brazilian state of Rio Grande do Sul. It is located in east Santa Maria.

== Villages ==
The bairro contains the following villages: Cerrito, Cerrito Dois, Fósseis da Alemoa, Morro do Cerrito, Morro Mariano da Rocha, Vila Floresta.

== Gallery of photos ==
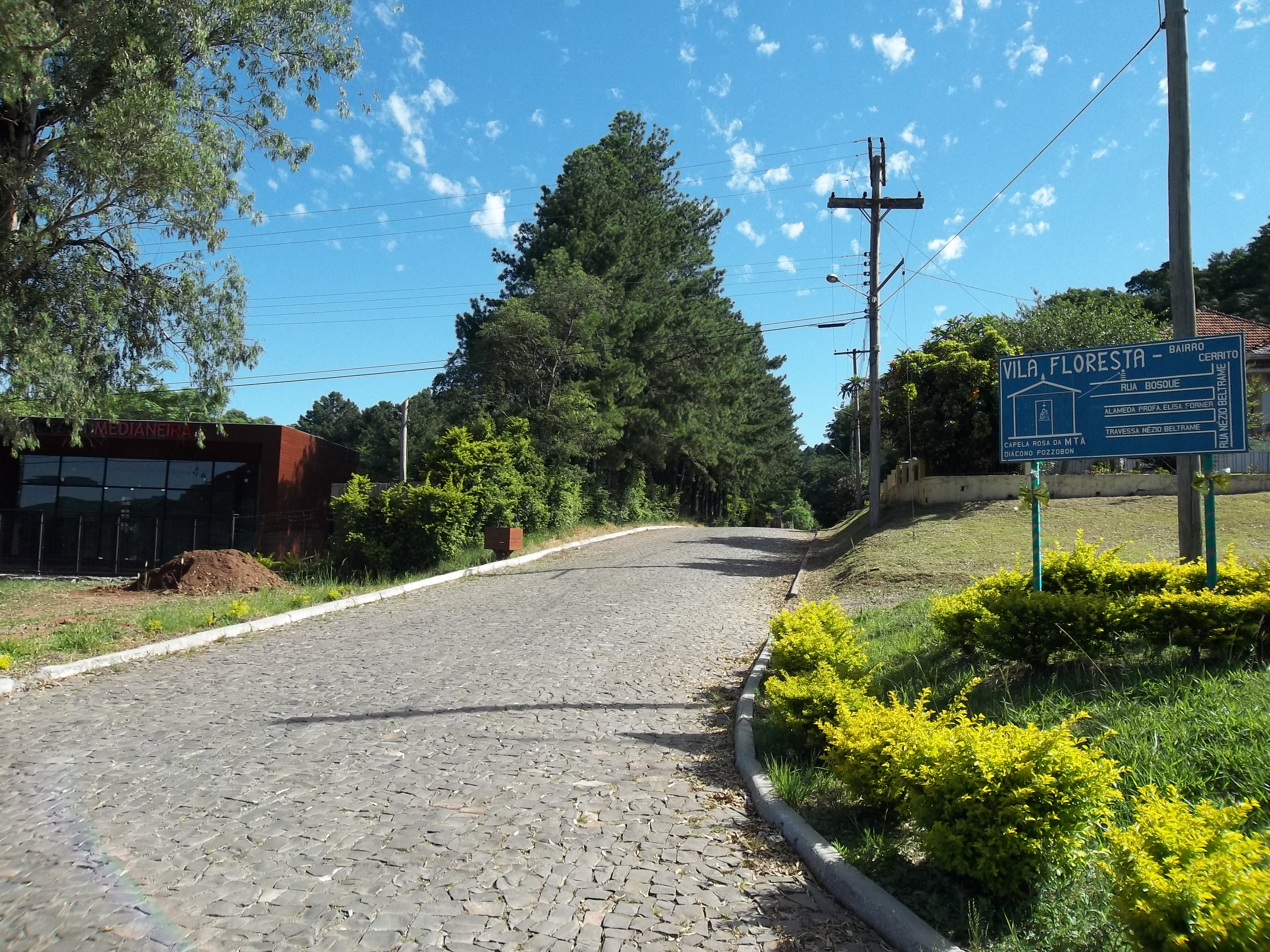
