= Dom Antônio Reis =

- Bairro
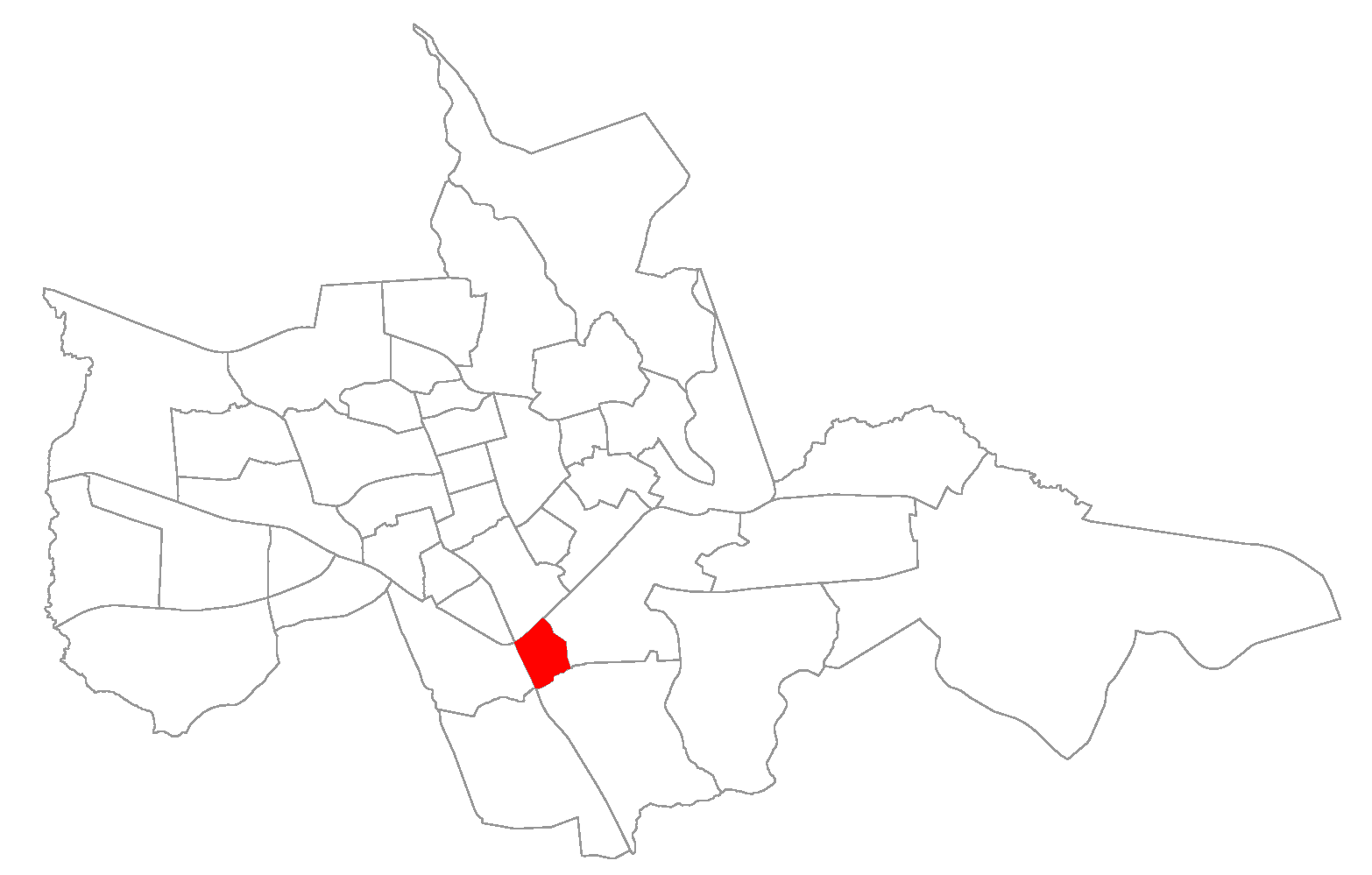
- The bairro in District of Sede

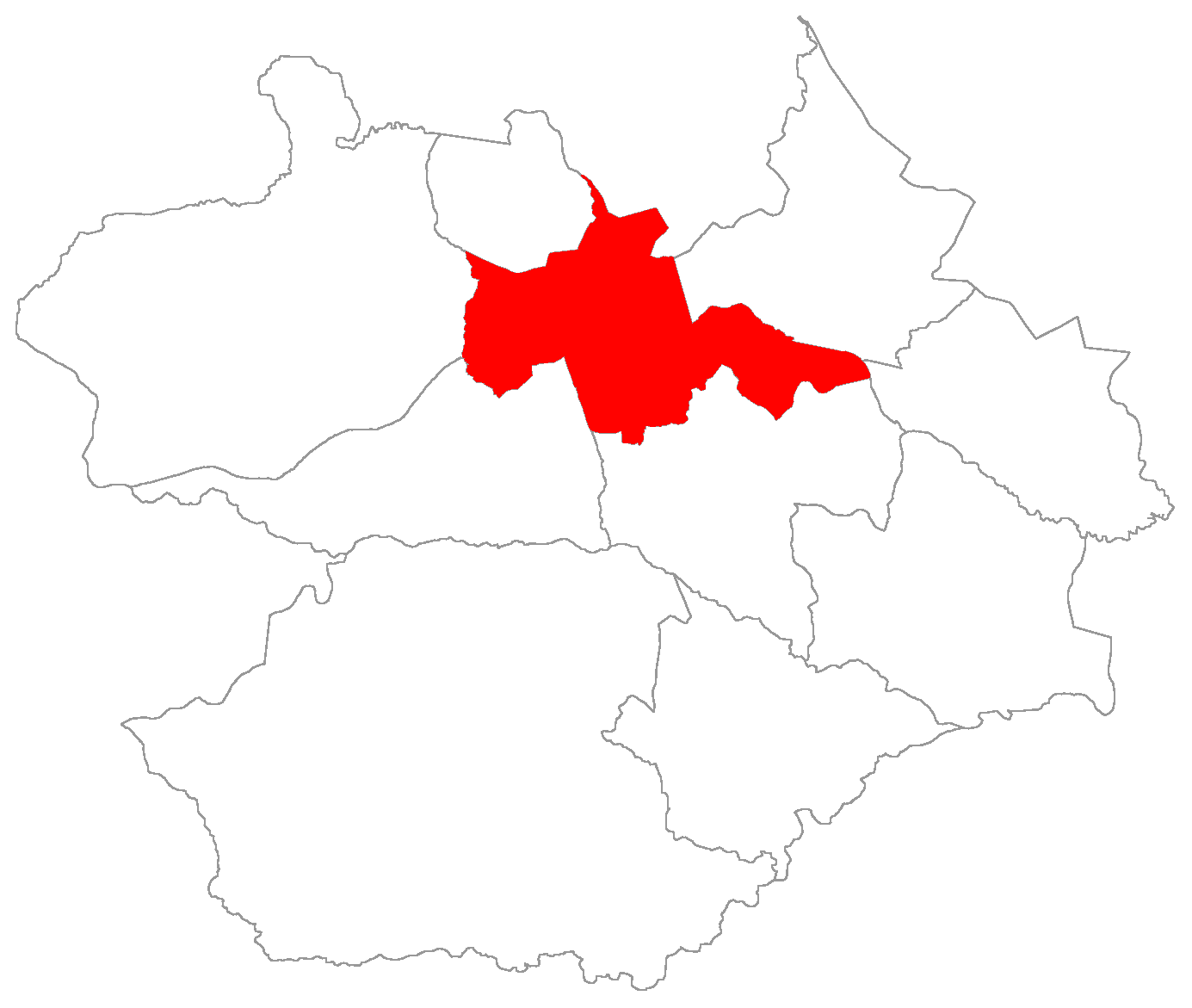
- District of Sede, in Santa Maria City, Rio Grande do Sul, Brazil
- Coordinates: 29°43′03.78″S 53°48′17.06″W
- Country: Brazil
- State: Rio Grande do Sul
- Municipality/City: Santa Maria
- District: District of Sede

Area
  - Total: 0.6270 km^{2} (0.2421 sq mi)

Population
  - Total: 1,984
  - Density: 3,164/km^{2} (8,195/sq mi)
- Postal code: 97.065-030 to 97.065-339
- Adjacent bairros: Cerrito, Lorenzi, Nossa Senhora Medianeira, Tomazetti, Uglione, Urlândia.
- Website: Official site of Santa Maria

Dom Antônio Reis ("Dom Antônio Reis - Brazilian bishop") is a bairro in the District of Sede in the municipality of Santa Maria, in the Brazilian state of Rio Grande do Sul. It is located in south Santa Maria.

== Villages ==
The bairro contains the villages of Dom Antônio Reis, Parque Residencial Dom Antonio Reis and Seminário São José.
