= Tomazetti =

- Bairro
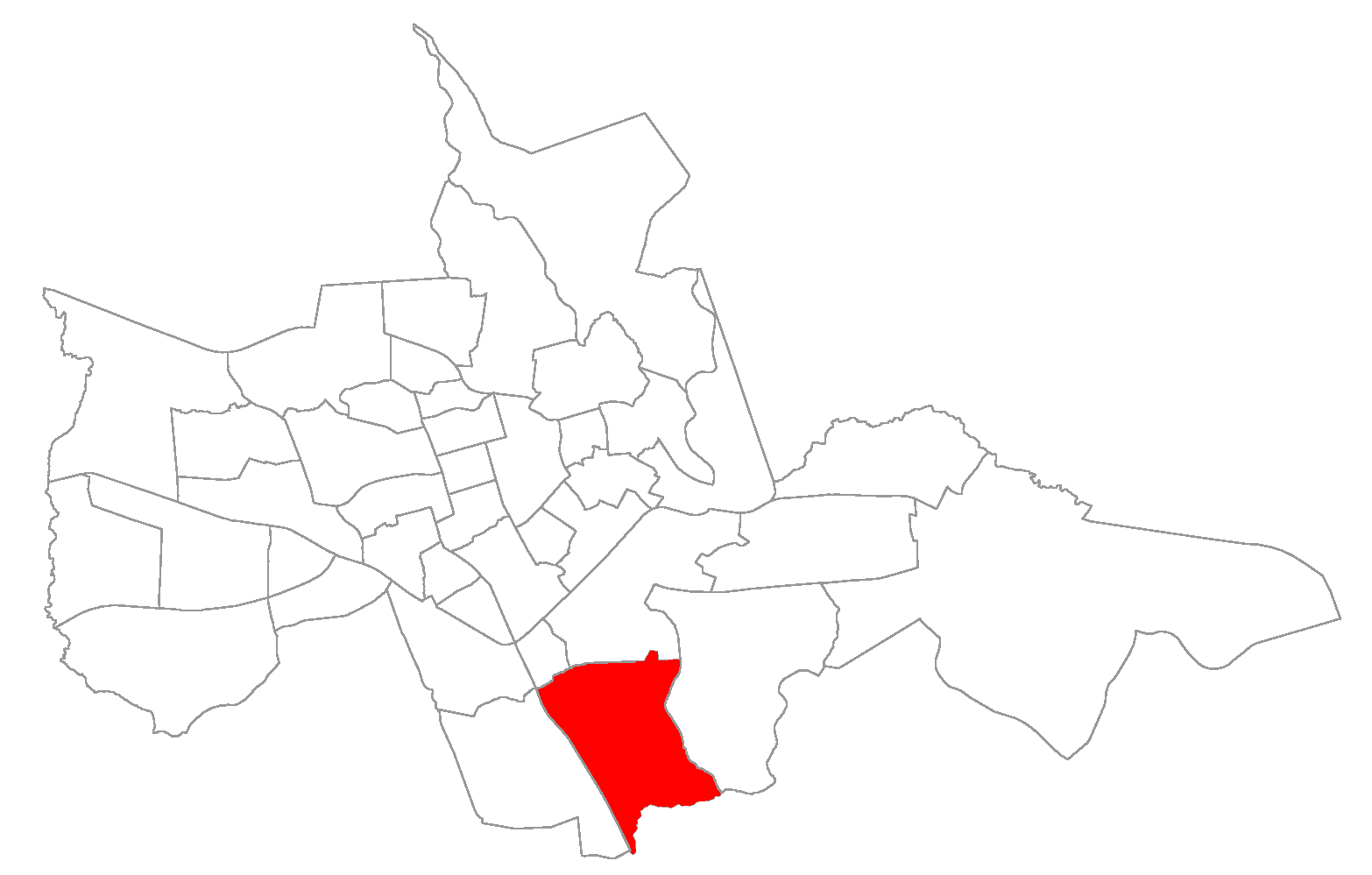
- The bairro in District of Sede

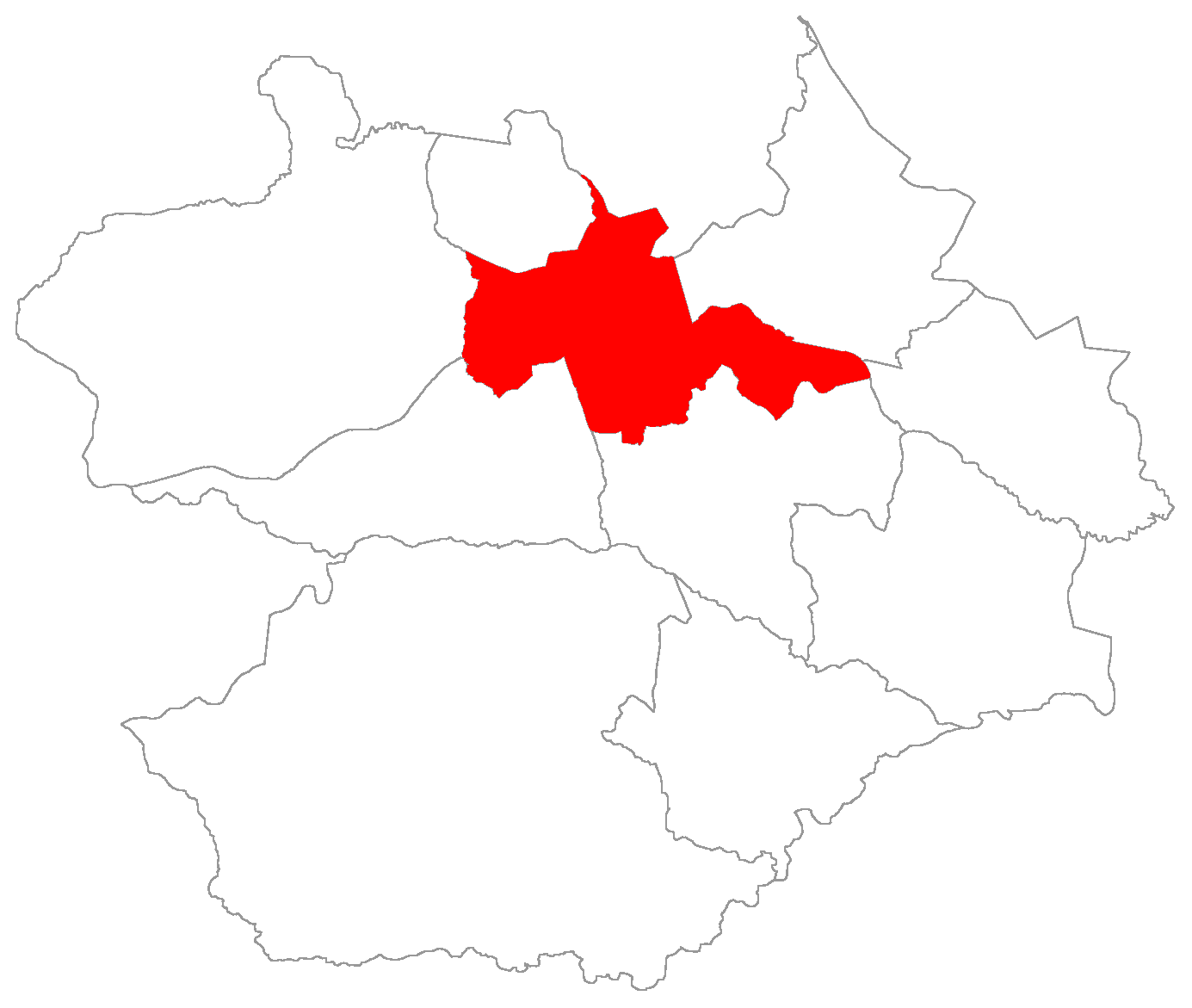
- District of Sede, in Santa Maria City, Rio Grande do Sul, Brazil
- Coordinates: 29°43′46.55″S 53°47′25.63″W
- Country: Brazil
- State: Rio Grande do Sul
- Municipality/City: Santa Maria
- District: District of Sede

Area
  - Total: 5.0768 km^{2} (1.9602 sq mi)

Population
  - Total: 2,039
  - Density: 401.6/km^{2} (1,040/sq mi)
- Postal code: 97.065-000 to 97.070-379
- Adjacent bairros: Cerrito, Dom Antônio Reis, Diácono João Luiz Pozzobon, Lorenzi, Pains, Urlândia.
- Website: Official site of Santa Maria

Tomazetti is a bairro in the District of Sede in the municipality of Santa Maria, in the Brazilian state of Rio Grande do Sul. It is located in south Santa Maria.

== Villages ==
The bairro contains the following villages: Parque Residencial Tomazetti, Tomazetti, Vila Tomaz.
