= Uglione =

- Bairro
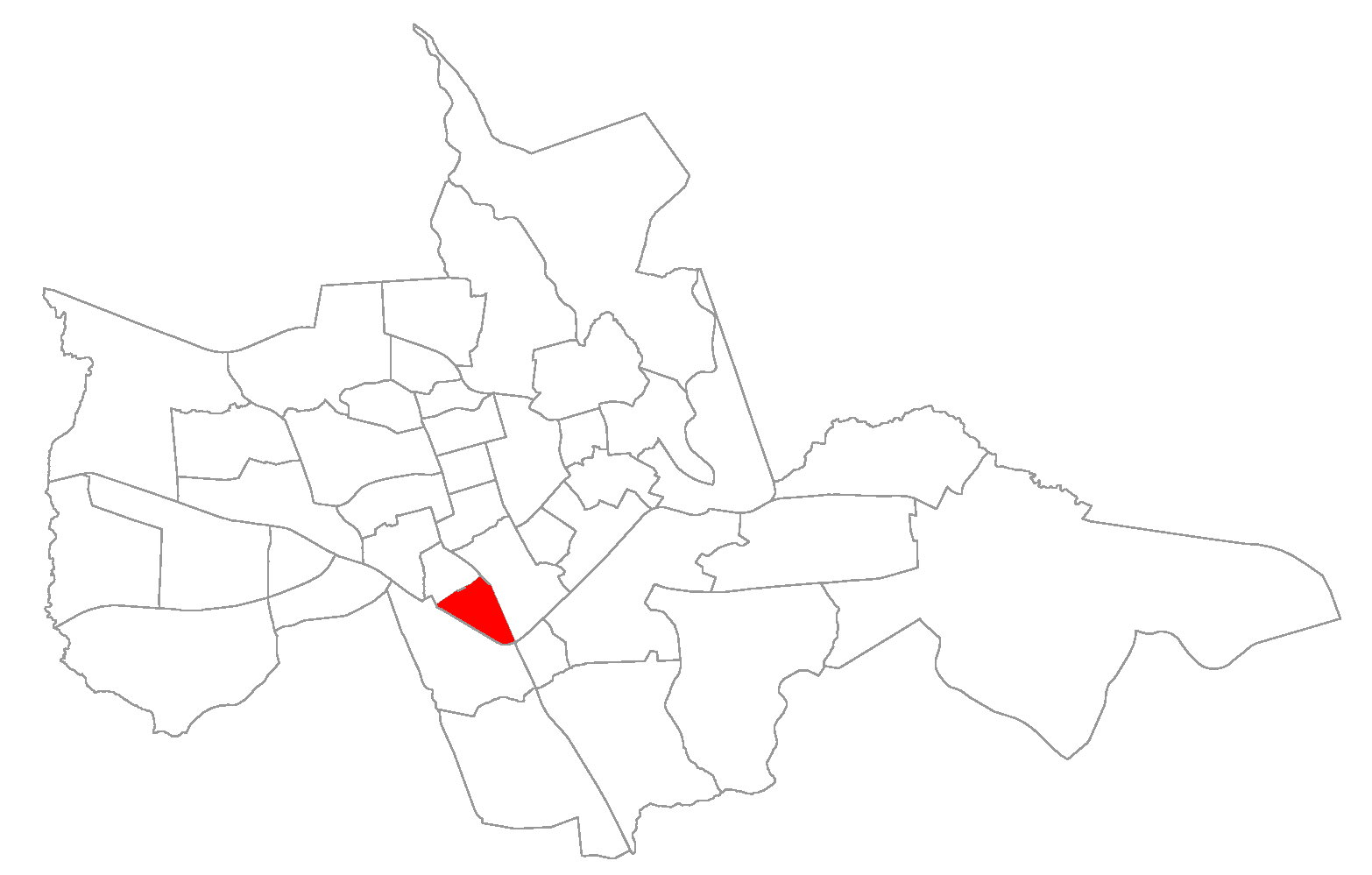
- The bairro in District of Sede

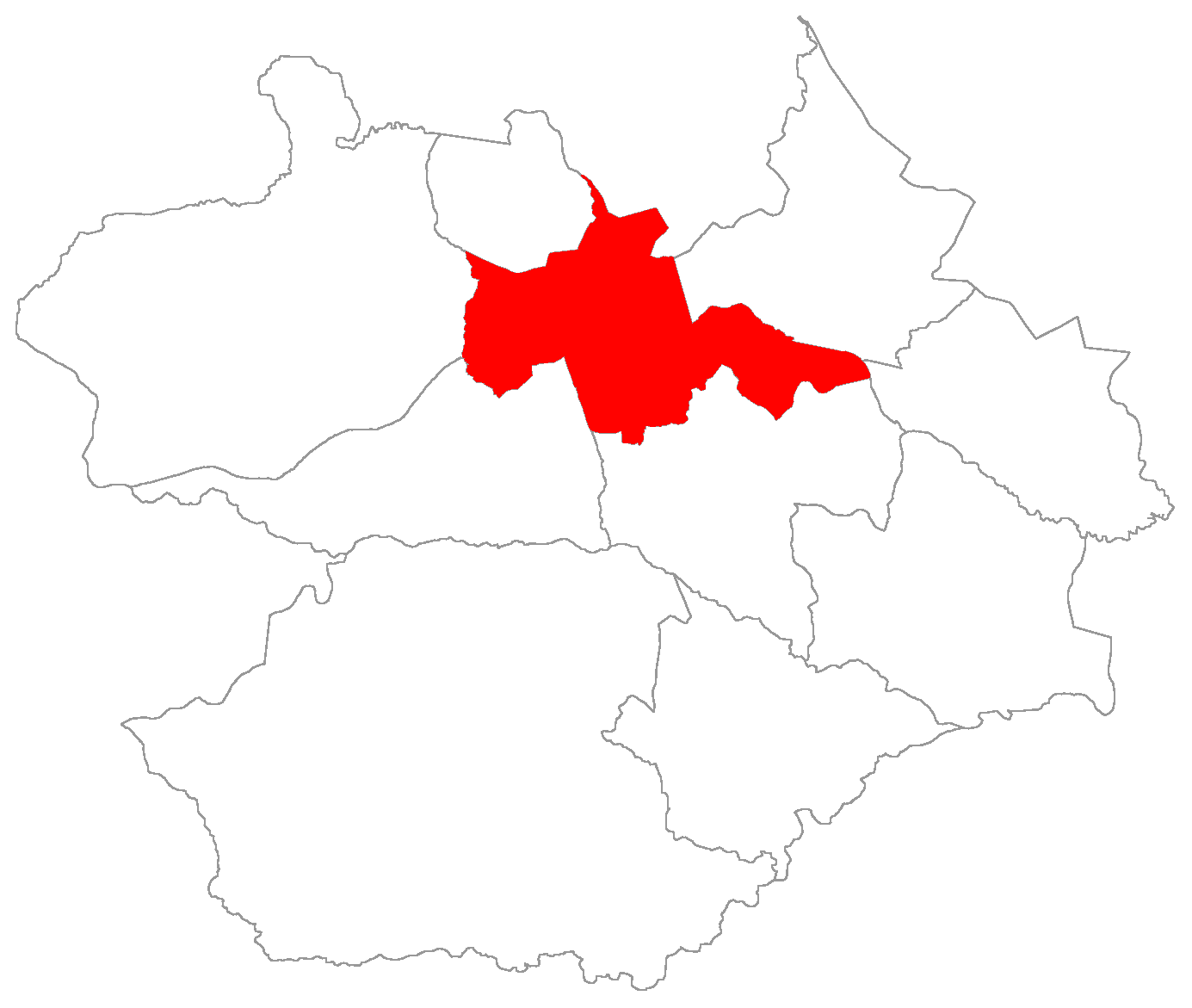
- District of Sede, in Santa Maria City, Rio Grande do Sul, Brazil
- Coordinates: 29°42′39.30″S 53°48′55.30″W
- Country: Brazil
- State: Rio Grande do Sul
- Municipality/City: Santa Maria
- District: District of Sede

Area
  - Total: 0.6978 km^{2} (0.2694 sq mi)

Population
  - Total: 1,808
  - Density: 2,591/km^{2} (6,711/sq mi)
- Postal code: 97.070-220 to 97.070-796
- Adjacent bairros: Dom Antônio Reis, Duque de Caxias, Nossa Senhora Medianeira, Urlândia.
- Website: Official site of Santa Maria

Uglione is a bairro in the District of Sede in the center-west of the municipality of Santa Maria, in the Brazilian state of Rio Grande do Sul.

== Villages ==
The bairro contains the following villages: Parque Residencial São Carlos, Uglione, Vila Alegria, Vila Goiânia, Vila São Pedro.

== Gallery of photos ==
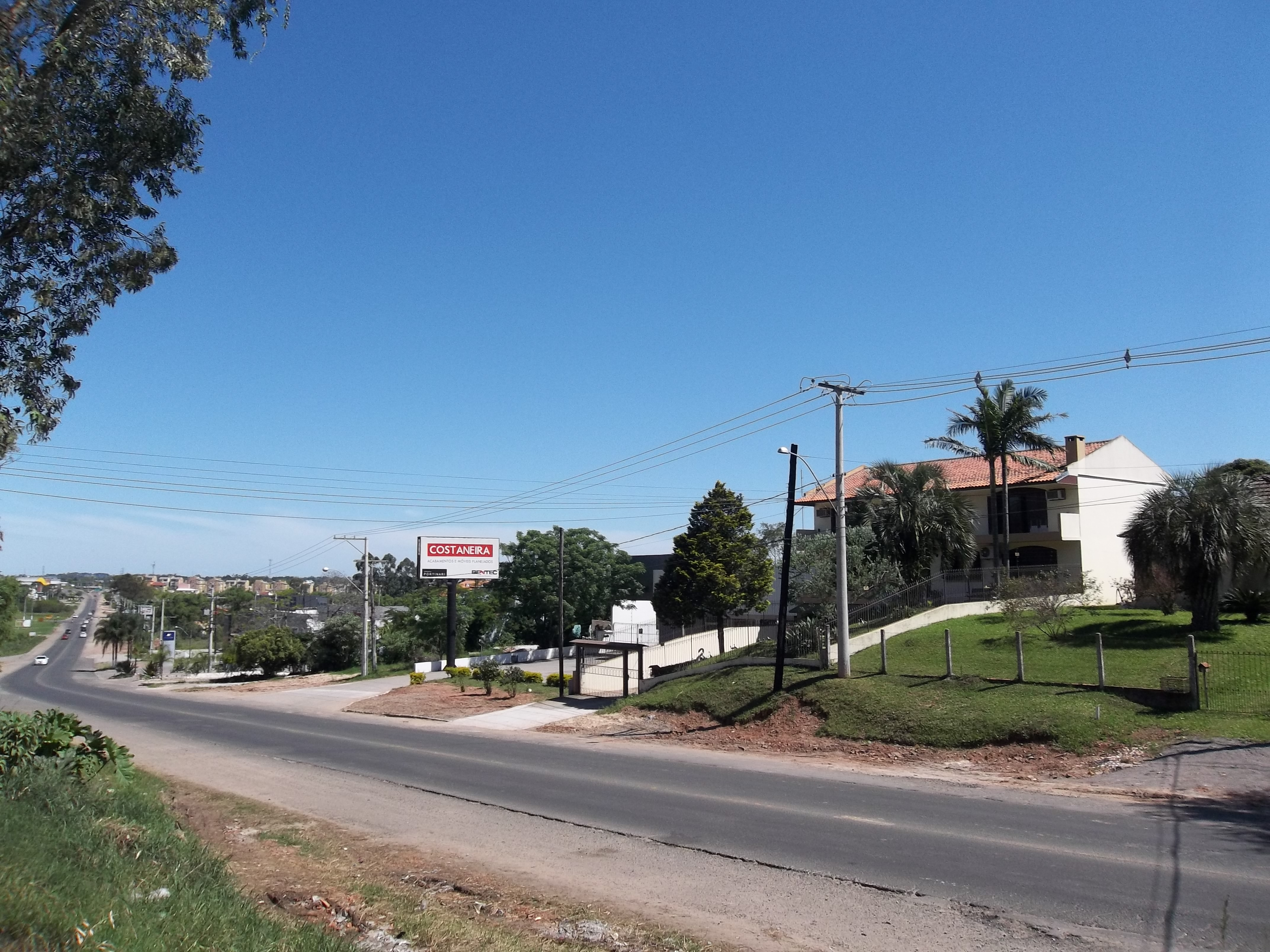
