= Sítio dos Paines =

- Residential area
- Representation of the Paines family flag, used during ceremonies and as a local flag of Sítio dos Paines.
- Interactive map of Sítio dos Paines
- Coordinates: 29.76027°S 53.79269°W
- Country: Brazil
- State: Rio Grande do Sul
- Municipality: Santa Maria, Rio Grande do Sul
- District: Pains (district of Santa Maria)
- Neighborhood: Passo das Tropas
- Time zone: UTC−03:00 (BRT)

Sítio dos Paines ("Paines Estate") is a residential area located within the neighborhood of Passo das Tropas, in the municipality of Santa Maria, in the state of Rio Grande do Sul, Brazil. Its development is associated with the settlement and land ownership of the Paines family, particularly Sérgio Paines and his wife, Emília Sattes Paines. Originally characterized by rural properties, the area underwent a process of land subdivision and sale, eventually developing into its present residential settlement.

The locality comprises eight streets, with Rua Sérgio Paines serving as its main circulation route. In July 2025, Sítio dos Paines was officially recognized by the municipal government as one of the five residential subdivisions comprising the neighborhood of Passo das Tropas, which became Santa Maria's 42nd officially designated neighborhood.

== History ==
=== Family origins ===
The formation of Sítio dos Paines is associated with the arrival and settlement of the Paines family in the municipality of Santa Maria. The surname has been associated with Anglo-Norman origins. An article published by the newspaper Zero Hora in October 2016 linked the surname Paines to medieval forms derived from Pain, which were introduced to England by the Normans.

The article also documented a family tradition according to which two Paines brothers left England for Rio Grande do Sul in the early 19th century. According to this account, one brother disembarked in Montevideo, while the other arrived at the port of Rio Grande and settled in the western region of Rio Grande do Sul. Their descendants subsequently spread to municipalities including Alegrete, Rosário do Sul, Itaqui, Santana do Livramento and Santa Maria.

According to family genealogical tradition, Sérgio Paines belonged to a branch of Anglo-Norman ancestry. His settlement in Santa Maria is associated with the establishment of the first properties that eventually gave rise to the area known as Sítio dos Paines. However, the specific genealogical connection between Sérgio Paines and the ancestors mentioned in the newspaper report requires further documentary evidence.

=== Sérgio Paines and Emília Sattes Paines ===
According to family accounts, Sérgio Paines, regarded as the founder of the locality, was a farmer and landowner who possessed approximately 15 hectares of land in the area. He was married to Emília Sattes Paines, who was descended from German immigrants and reportedly inherited an additional 13 hectares of land.

The couple therefore owned approximately 28 hectares of land. They had seven children, to whom plots of approximately three hectares or slightly more were allocated. Their descendants established themselves on the inherited properties, built homes and formed their own families.

The division of the land among the children was an important stage in the formation of the locality. It resulted in the establishment of several family properties and contributed to the continued association of the Paines surname with the area's territorial identity.

=== Residential expansion and development ===
Over the years, portions of the family's land began to be sold and subdivided into individual plots. This process contributed to an increase in the local population and the gradual transformation of the former rural area into a residential settlement.

The expansion of residential occupation was accompanied by the opening and naming of streets, the construction of houses and the establishment of commercial and service activities. The locality developed small grocery stores, a distribution business, transportation services and business activities associated with mining.

Businesses mentioned in connection with the area include the Falcon transport company and Stangherlin Mineração, a mining-related enterprise. These businesses form part of the economic activities associated with the locality's development.

=== Municipal records and urban development ===
The presence of Sítio dos Paines in municipal administrative records can be documented from at least 2010. On 31 August of that year, Municipal Laws No. 5,348 and No. 5,349 were enacted, naming Rua Valdemar Paines and Rua Sérgio Paines, respectively. Both laws explicitly identify the streets as being located in Sítio dos Paines, within Passo das Tropas, in the district of Pains.

On 6 September 2012, Municipal Law No. 5,681 established additional street names within Sítio dos Paines, including Rua Emília Sattes Paines and Rua João Paines.

In November 2015, the Passo das Tropas area, previously classified as rural and located in the district of Pains, was incorporated into Santa Maria's urban perimeter following an amendment approved by the municipal legislature. The change enabled the application of urban planning and land regularization measures in the region.

In January 2025, the Santa Maria municipal government reported that Sítio dos Paines was among the localities included in a land regularization program concerning privately owned properties.

In July of the same year, another land regularization process identified 251 plots distributed among four urban settlements, including Sítio dos Paines, in Passo das Tropas. During the initiative, 82 property registrations were delivered to their respective owners across the participating settlements.

On 12 July 2025, Passo das Tropas was officially designated Santa Maria's 42nd neighborhood under Complementary Law No. 188. The new territorial organization comprises five residential subdivisions: Vila Ipiranga, Vila Marques, Vila Videira, Vila Abrantes and Sítio dos Paines.

== Streets ==
The street network of Sítio dos Paines consists of the following eight roads:

- Rua Sérgio Paines – the locality's principal thoroughfare;
- Rua Noemia Paines;
- Rua Emília Sattes Paines;
- Rua Valdemar Paines;
- Rua João Paines;
- Rua Ginio Paynes;
- Travessa dos Paines;
- Rua Leonardo S. Paines.

Rua Sérgio Paines serves as the principal circulation route within the residential settlement and is a reference point for the organization of its other streets. The names Rua Sérgio Paines and Rua Valdemar Paines were established by municipal legislation in 2010, while Rua Emília Sattes Paines and Rua João Paines were included in Municipal Law No. 5,681, enacted in 2012.

According to local accounts, Rua Ginio Paynes was the last street in the locality to receive an official name.

== Economy ==
Sítio dos Paines has commercial, transportation and service activities that serve its residents and the wider Passo das Tropas area. These include small retail establishments, grocery stores, a distribution business, transportation services and business activities related to mining.

Businesses associated with the locality include the Falcon transport company and Stangherlin Mineração.

== Gallery ==
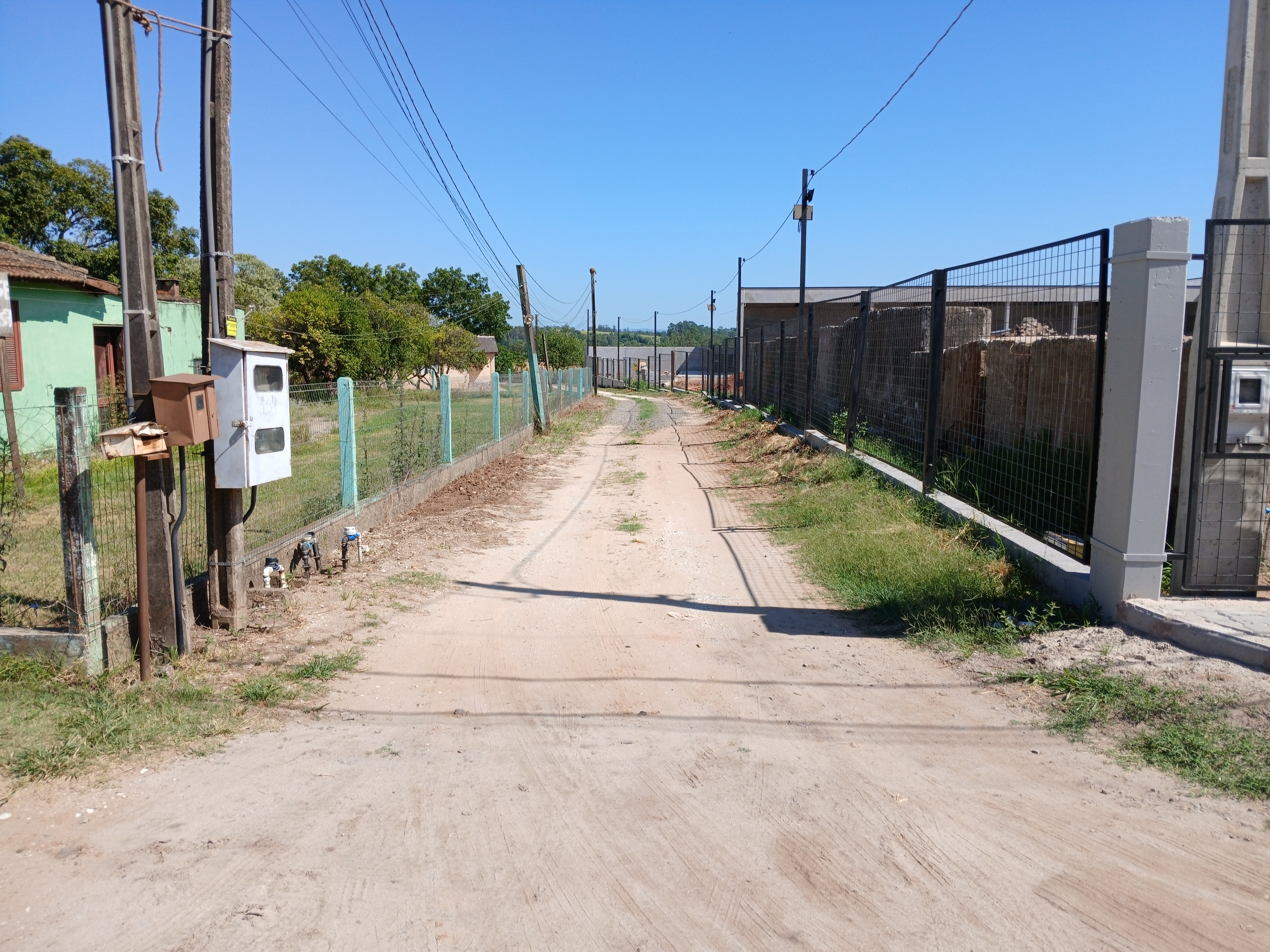
View of Rua Ginio Paynes

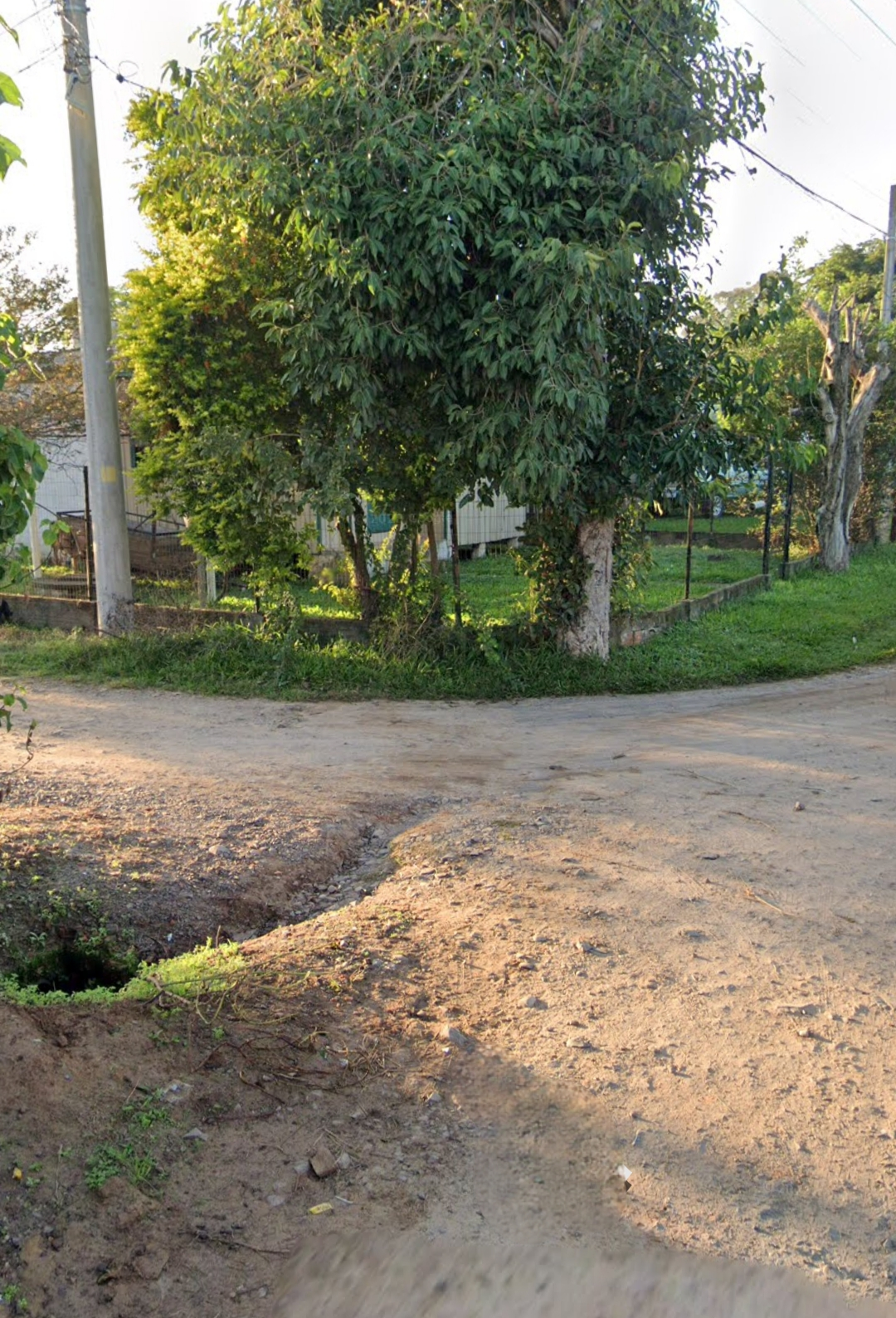
View of Rua Emília Sattes Paines

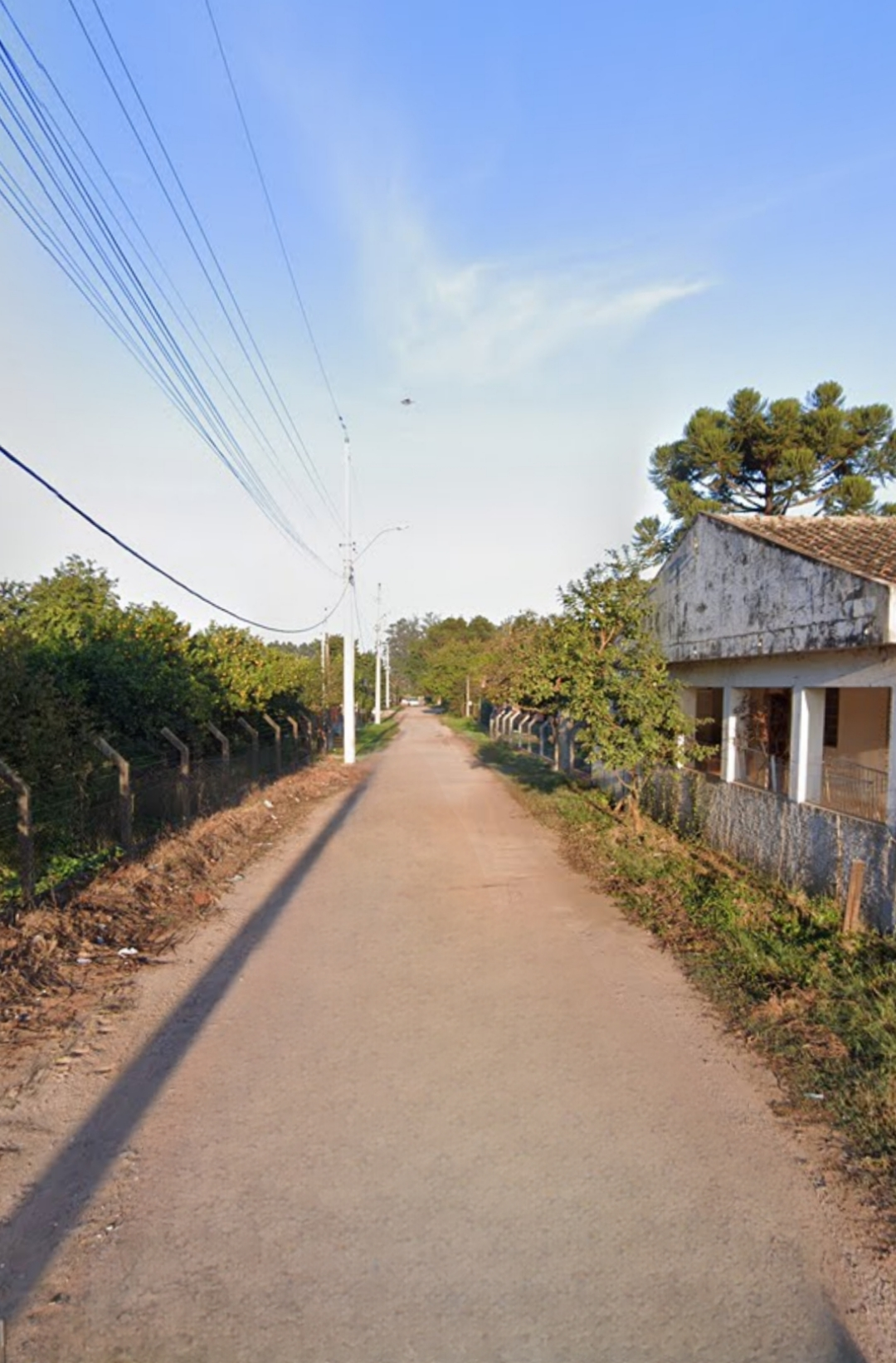
View of Rua Valdemar Paines

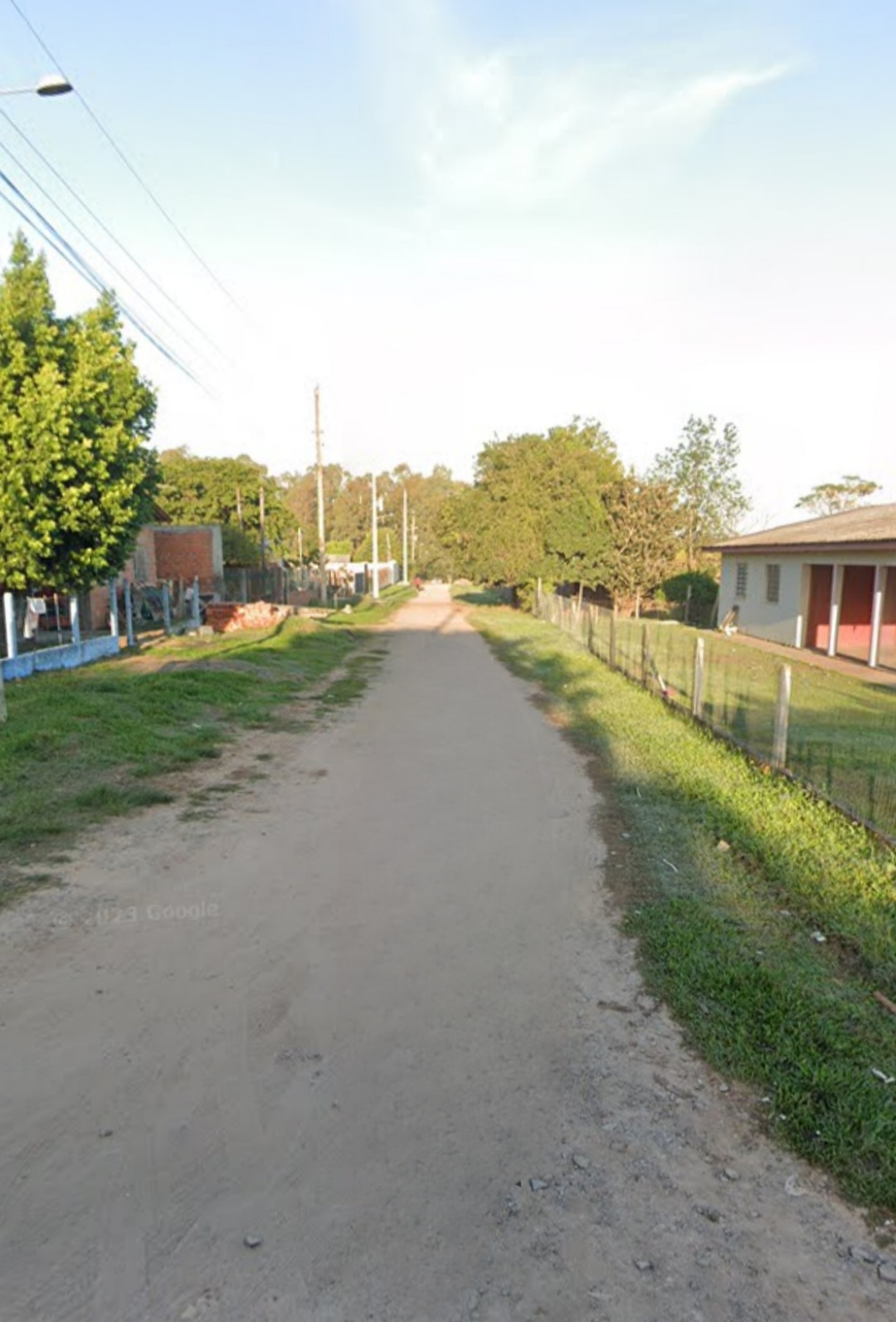
View of Rua João Paines

View of Rua Noemia Paines

View of Travessa dos Paines

== See also ==
- Santa Maria, Rio Grande do Sul
- Passo das Tropas
- Pains (district of Santa Maria)
