= Duque de Caxias, Santa Maria =

Duque de Caxias
- Bairro
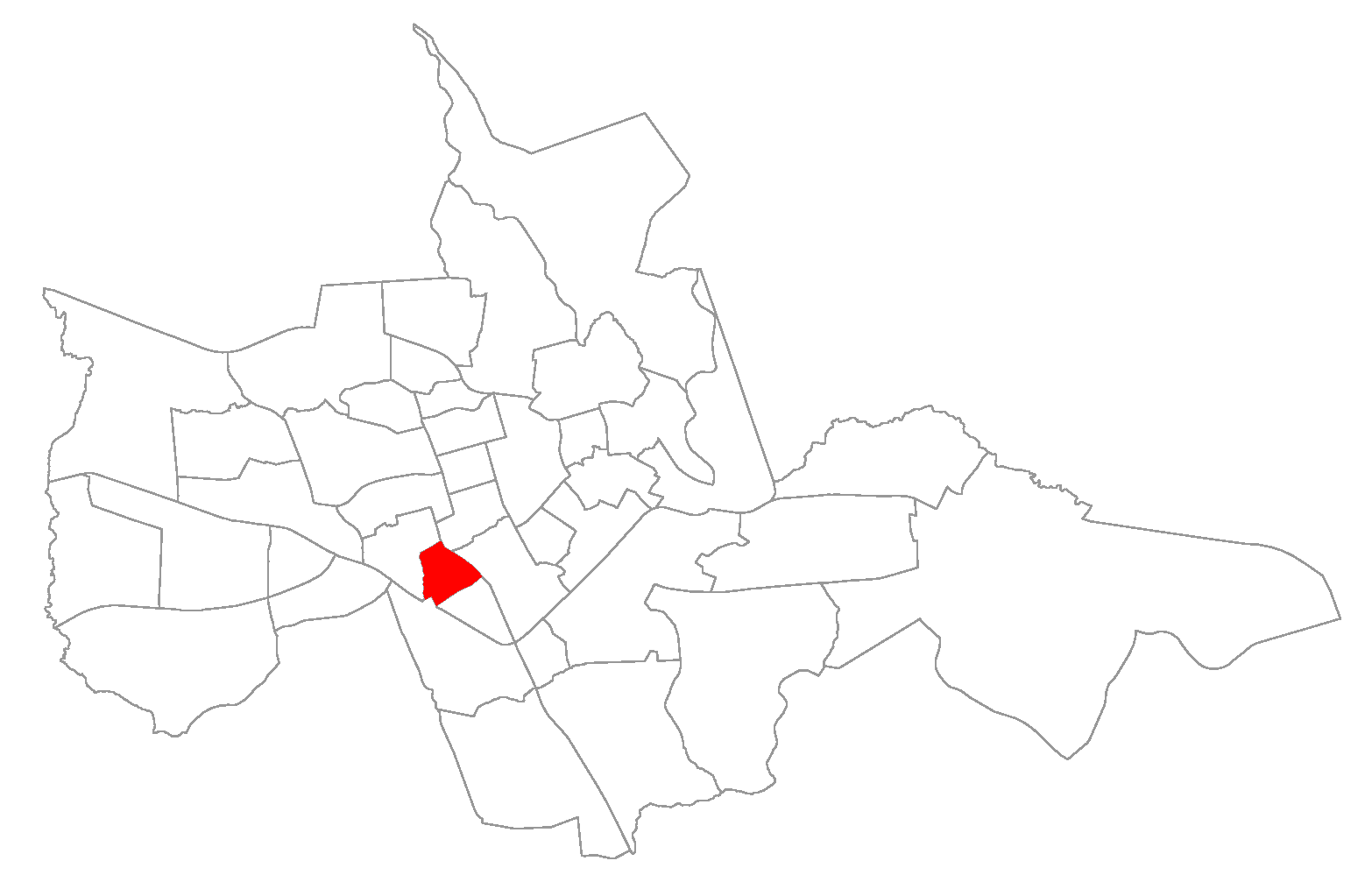
- The bairro in District of Sede

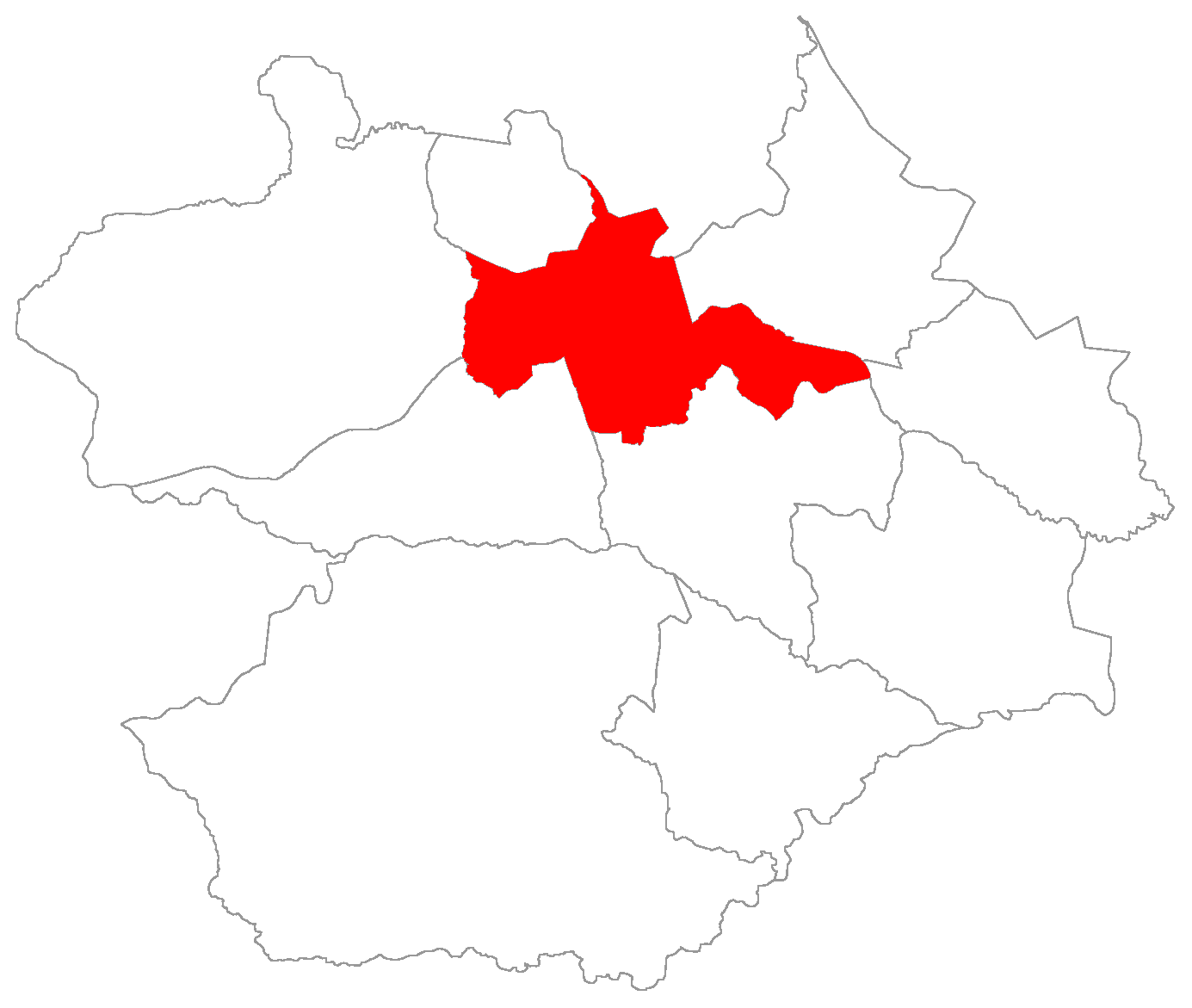
- District of Sede, in Santa Maria City, Rio Grande do Sul, Brazil
- Coordinates: 29°42′15.70″S 53°49′16.76″W
- Country: Brazil
- State: Rio Grande do Sul
- Municipality/City: Santa Maria
- District: District of Sede

Area
  - Total: 0.6062 km^{2} (0.2341 sq mi)

Population
  - Total: 3,339
  - Density: 5,508/km^{2} (14,270/sq mi)
- Postal code: 97.070-000 to 97.070-809
- Adjacent bairros: Nossa Senhora de Fátima, Nossa Senhora Medianeira, Patronato, Uglione, Urlândia.
- Website: Official site of Santa Maria

Duque de Caxias ("Luís Alves de Lima e Silva, Duke of Caxias") is a bairro in the District of Sede in the municipality of Santa Maria, in the Brazilian state of Rio Grande do Sul. It is located in centre-west Santa Maria.

== Villages ==
The bairro contains the following villages: Duque de Caxias, Parque Residencial Duque de Caxias, Vila Lameira, Vila Moreira, Vila Plátano.

== Gallery of photos ==
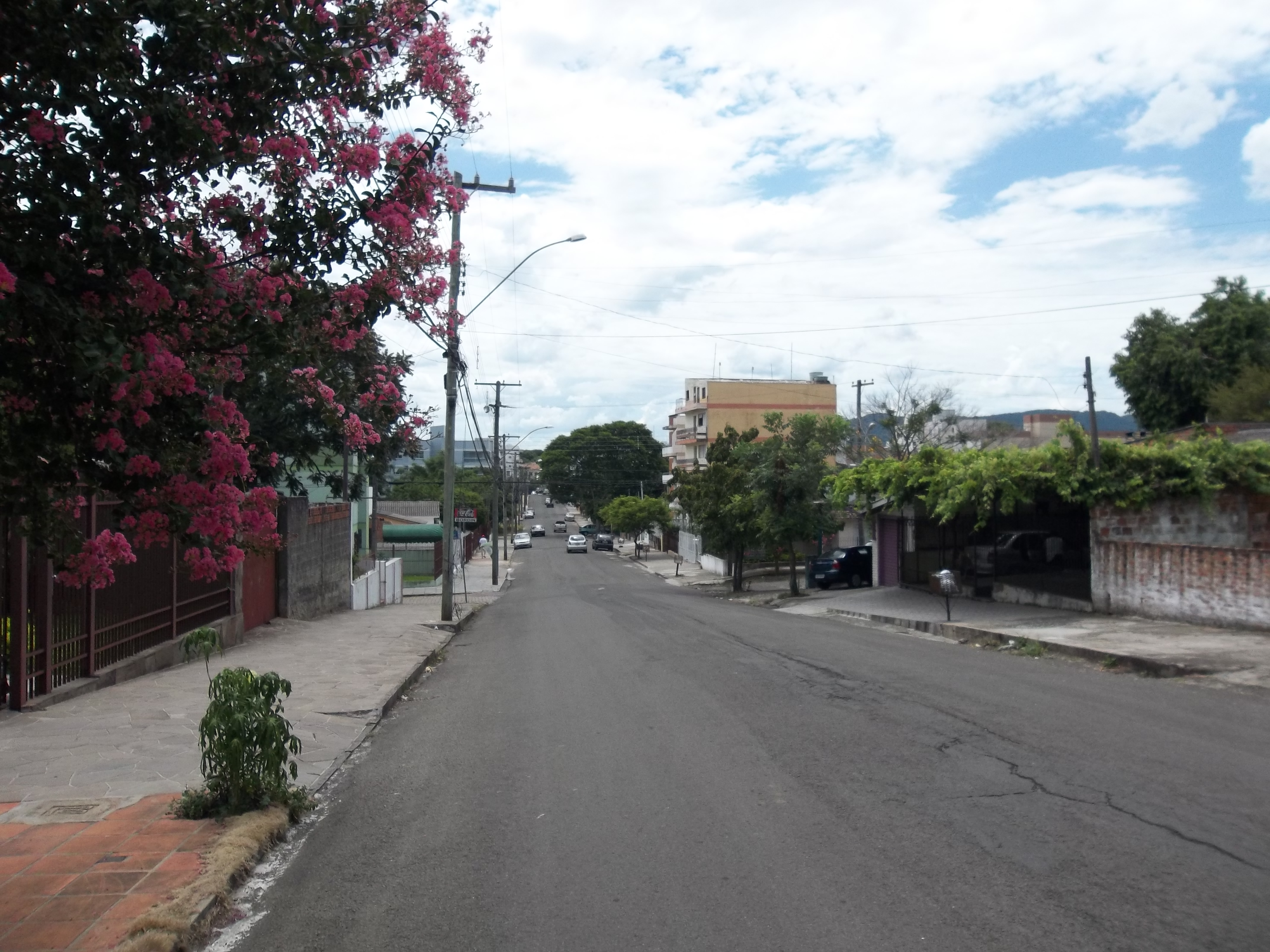
