= Urlândia =

- Bairro
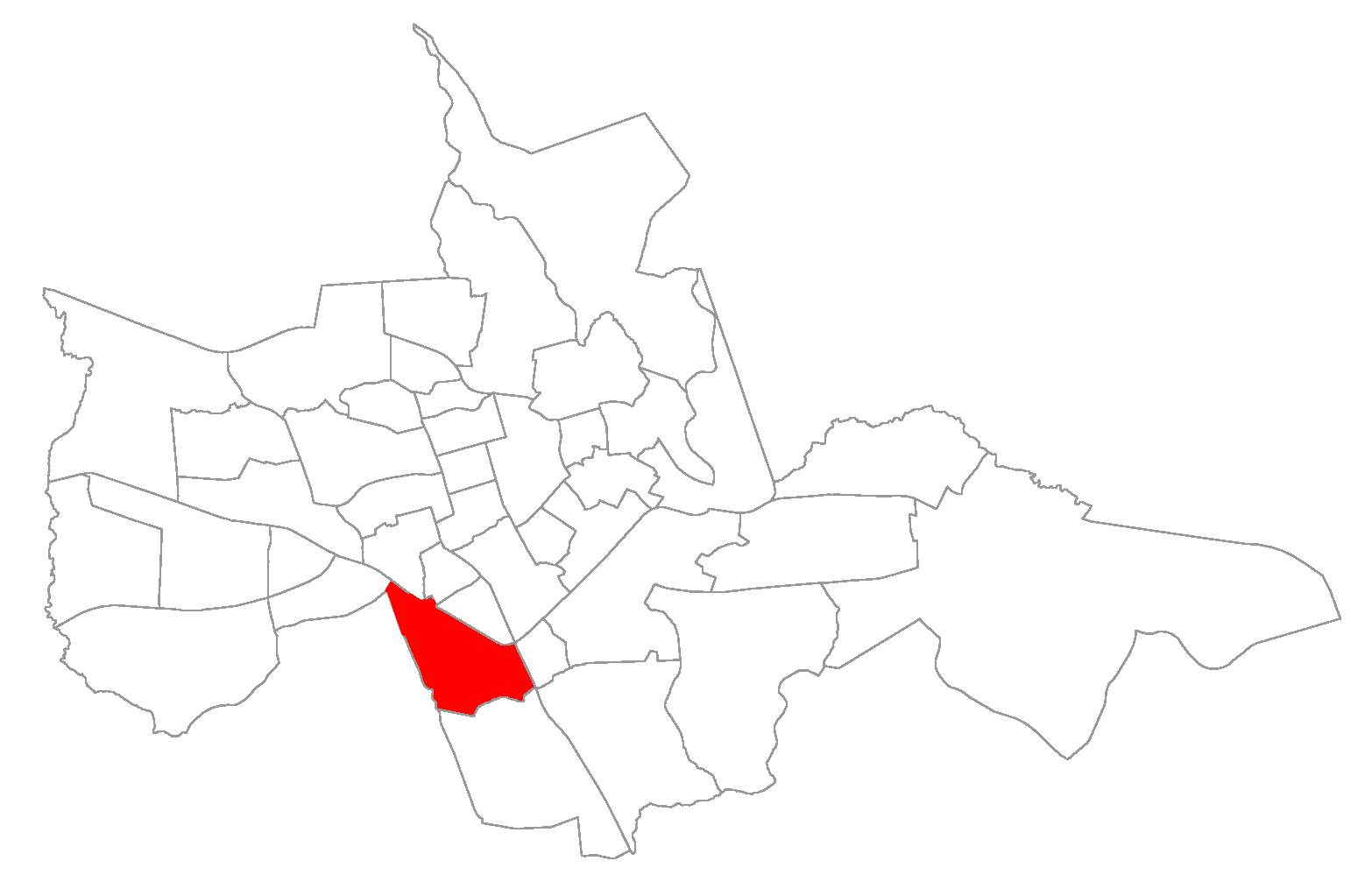
- The bairro in District of Sede

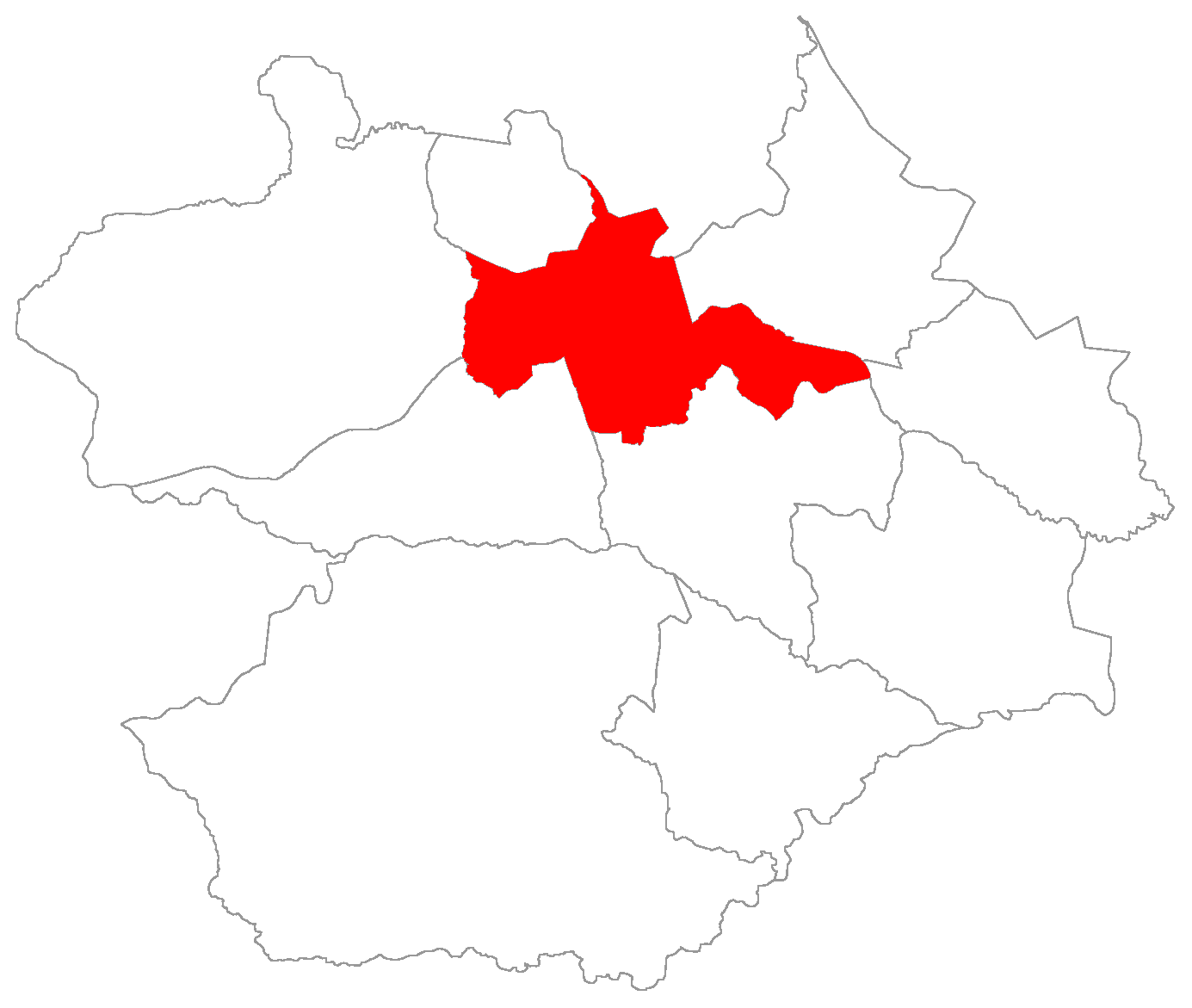
- District of Sede, in Santa Maria City, Rio Grande do Sul, Brazil
- Coordinates: 29°43′03.10″S 53°49′05.33″W
- Country: Brazil
- State: Rio Grande do Sul
- Municipality/City: Santa Maria
- District: District of Sede

Area
  - Total: 2.7829 km^{2} (1.0745 sq mi)

Population
  - Total: 8,967
  - Density: 3,222/km^{2} (8,345/sq mi)
- Postal code: 97.070-030 to 97.070-899
- Adjacent bairros: Dom Antônio Reis, Duque de Caxias, Lorenzi, Nossa Senhora Medianeira, Patronato, Renascença, São Valentim, Tomazetti, Uglione.
- Website: Official site of Santa Maria

Urlândia is a bairro in the District of Sede in the municipality of Santa Maria, in the Brazilian state of Rio Grande do Sul. It is located in south Santa Maria.

== Villages ==
The bairro contains the following villages: Parque Residencial São Carlos, Urlândia, Vila Formosa, Vila Santos, Vila Tropical, Vila Urlândia.
