= Escola Major Tancredo Penna de Moraes =

Coordinates: 29°43′37.72″S 53°34′46.83″W

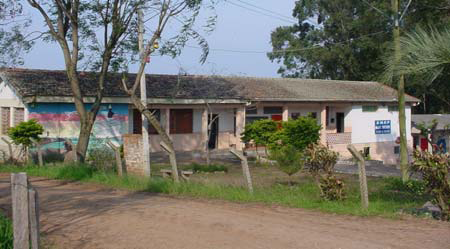
Photo of the school.

Escola Major Tancredo Penna de Moraes is a Brazilian primary school localized in the Palma neighbourhood, in Santa Maria City, Rio Grande do Sul State.

The address of the school is km 220, RSC-287 roadway, corner to Luiz Bortoluzzi Street.

== History ==
The municipal law 1416/69 of December 19, 1969, sanctioned by the mayor Dr. Luiz Alves Rolim Sobrinho, gives the name of the school

The school is distinguished to be a "center school" because it concentrates all areas that reached this school and anothers extinct school of Palma.

The school keeps the memory of the history of Sesmaria da Palma and about the Italian immigration in Brazil.

Major Tancredo Penna de Moraes donated the school's land at the beginning of the 19th century. It is the only school in Palma.

The communities, that embrace the school, have organization due to Italian families, to owners of Palma Farm, where the school is, to employees and descendants of slaves from the farm. The Palma Farm arose in the beginning of the 19th century, when José Fernandes Penna, the great-grandfather of Tancredo Penna de Moraes, received a grant of land from the Brazilian government. Yet nowadays, in the farm seat, there is the house, built in 1847 and the kitchen of the slave in good order.

The school attend the following communities:

- Community of Vila Fighera, where there was the Santo Antônio School;
- Community of São Sebastião, where there was the São Sebastião School;
- Community of Faxinal da Palma where there were the Pillon School and the Faxinal da Palma School.
- Community of Linha Cinco Sul (Vale dos Panno), where there was the Linha Cinco Sul School;
- Community of Linha Sete Sul, where there was the Santa Augusta School;
- Community of Palma, where there was the Olavo Bilac School and other school that originated the actual School.

== See also ==
- Santa Maria, Rio Grande do Sul;
- District of Palma;
- Palma neighbourhood;
- Comunidade Arnesto Penna Carneiro;
- Trans World Radio;
