= Km 3 =

- Bairro
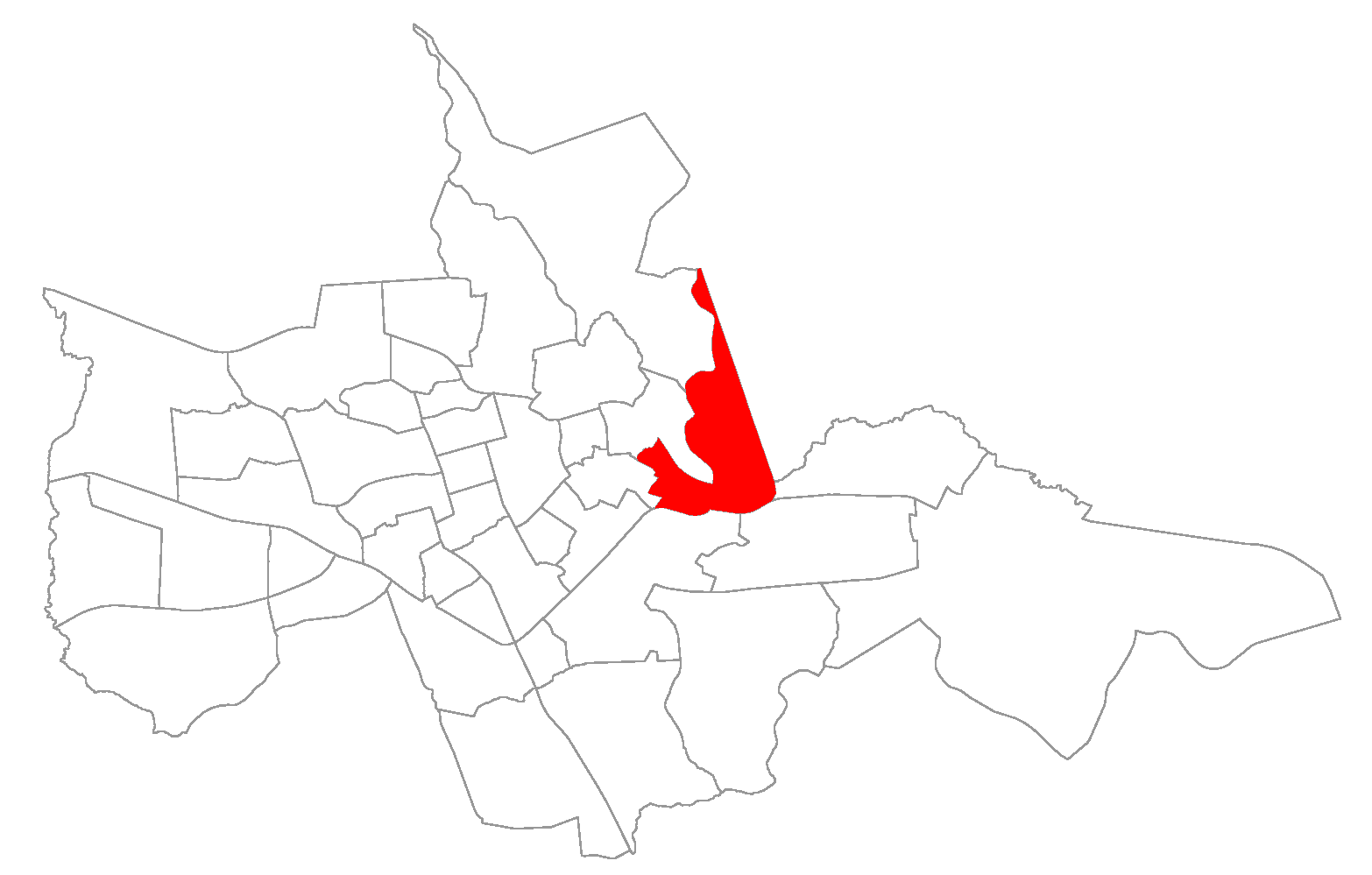
- The bairro in District of Sede

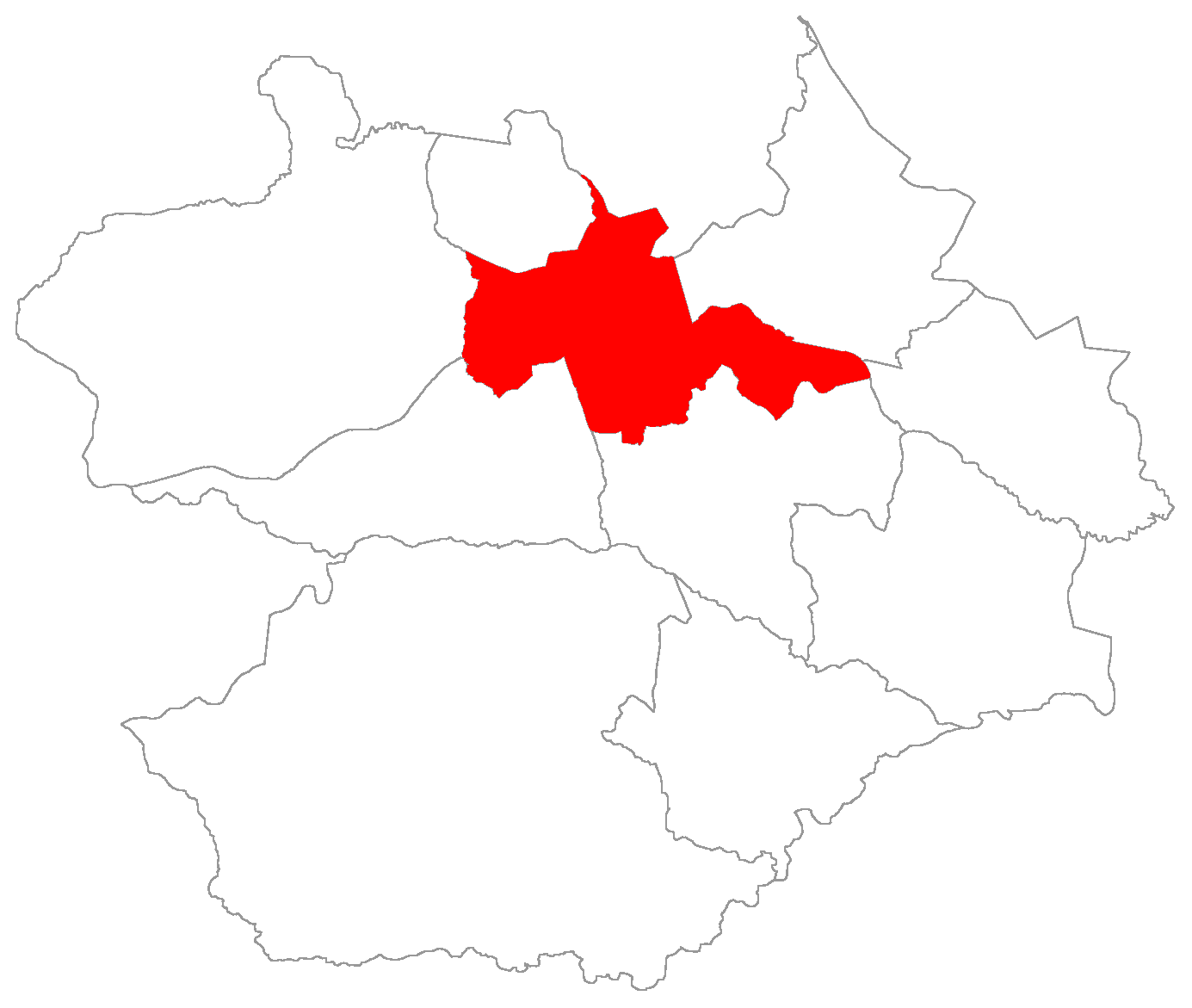
- District of Sede, in Santa Maria City, Rio Grande do Sul, Brazil
- Coordinates: 29°41′19.29″S 53°46′25.08″W
- Country: Brazil
- State: Rio Grande do Sul
- Municipality/City: Santa Maria
- District: District of Sede

Area
  - Total: 3.4878 km^{2} (1.3466 sq mi)

Population
  - Total: 2,504
  - Density: 717.9/km^{2} (1,859/sq mi)
- Postal code: 97.090-090 to 97.095-709
- Adjacent bairros: Arroio Grande, Campestre do Menino Deus, Cerrito, Nossa Senhora das Dores, Pé de Plátano, Presidente João Goulart, São José.
- Website: Official site of Santa Maria

Km 3 (Portuguese pronunciation: [kiˈlometɾu ˈtɾes], "Km 3") is a Bairro in the District of Sede in the municipality of Santa Maria, in the Brazilian state of Rio Grande do Sul. It is located in northeast Santa Maria.

== Villages ==
The bairro contains the following villages: Km 3, Vila Anacleto Corrêa, Vila Bilibiu, Vila Dr. Wautier, Vila Favarin, Vila Palmares.

== Gallery of photos ==
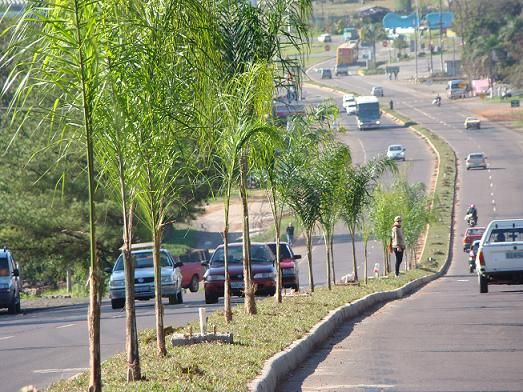
