= Comunidade Arnesto Penna Carneiro =

Brazilian quilombo in Rio Grande do Sul

Coordinates: 29°44′38.01″S 53°32′06.70″W

Comunidade Arnesto Penna Carneiro (also, Recanto dos Evangélicos, or yet, Quilombo da Palma) is a Brazilian quilombo localized in the Palma neighbourhood, district of Palma, Santa Maria City, Rio Grande do Sul State.

The quilombo is 29 kilometer far from Downtown Santa Maria.

== History ==
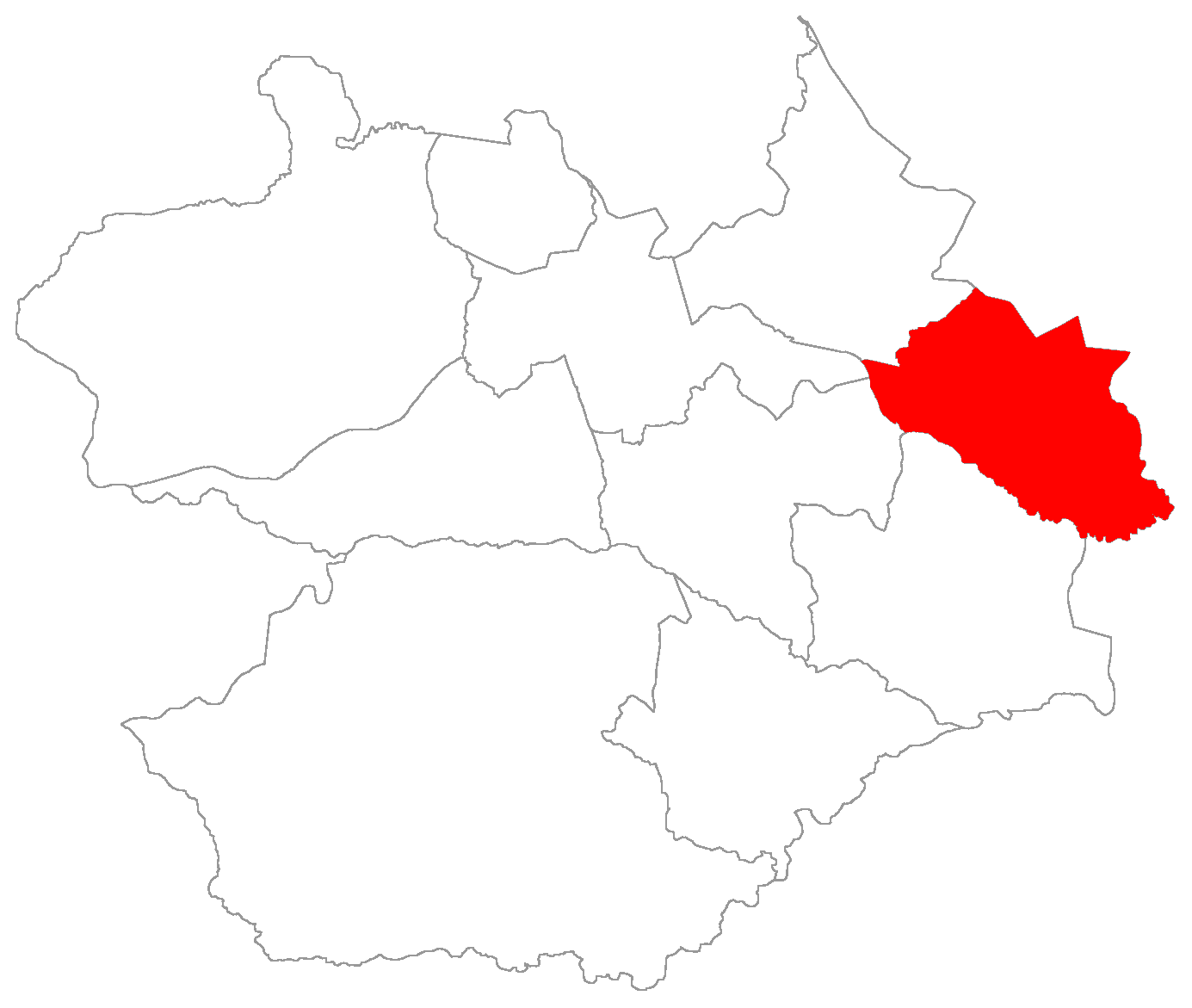
Localization of Comunidade Arnesto Penna Carneiro in the municipality of Santa Maria. In red the district of Palma.

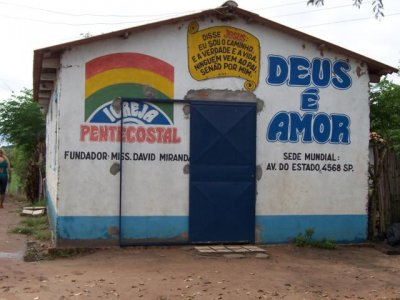
Church Deus é Amor. The inhabitants' religious option gives to the quilombo one of its names: Recanto dos Evangélicos ("Evangelicals' corner").

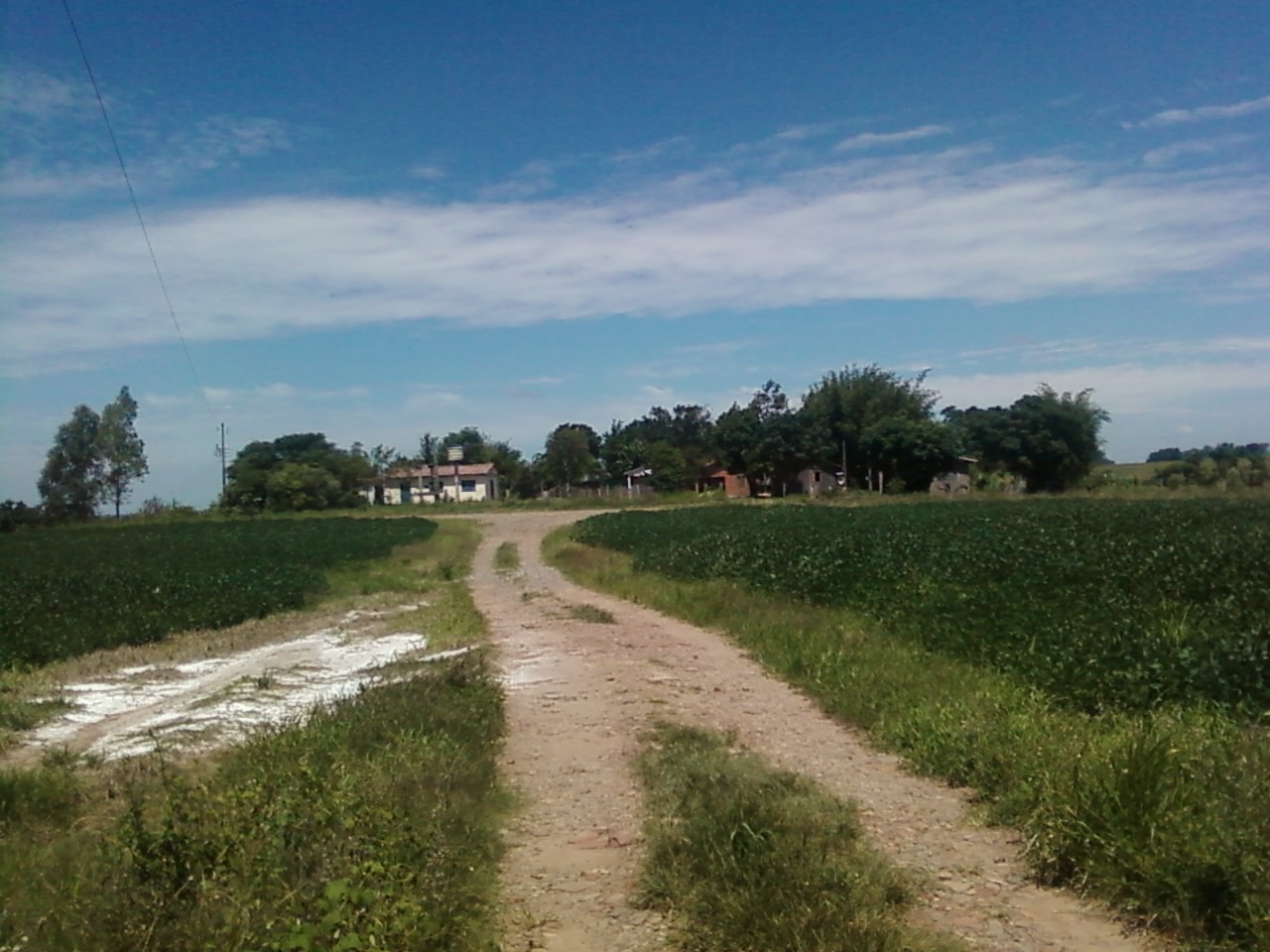
Ernesto Carneiro Penna Street in direction to quilombo.

Ex-slave Ernesto Carneiro Penna's family inherited their lands due to the thankfulness that their Masters had for them.

Thus, Comunidade Quilombola Arnesto Penna Carneiro is designated as a troupe of families that are related to one another, and live at an area received from their forefathers, situated in Palma, Santa Maria. Therefore, the history of Comunidade Arnesto Penna Carneiro begins with The Pennas in the beginning of the 19th century.

Manoel Fernandes Penna had arrived to Santa Maria in 1808, where he received lands from Monarchs of Portugal, in the region currently situated in the quilombo. Manoel Fernandes Penna's grandson, whose name is also Manoel Fernandes Penna, inherited his lands, and kept up to 1884, the same model of work used by his ancestors, utilizing a slavery workforce.

The farm was the birthplace of slave Balbina's sons: Leandro, Luiza, Casemiro, Ernesto and Hermes as is evident in Book of baptism – Slaves (1871–1887) and in Book of baptism #16 (1886–1889), that after would rend the family's inherits. When Manoel Fernandes Pena died, his assets rested to his wife, whom he marries in sharing of goods. She, that hadn't sons, left in her testament, drawn up in the purveyory of City of Santa Maria da Boca do Monte, on 22 September 1905, a part of her goods to ex-slave Balbina's descendants, like is in the testament:

I declare that for my death I leave my invernada to negros Leandro, Luiza, Casemiro, Ernesto and Hermes, that will inherit together with Assunção Zeferino Rodrigues in equal parts to each one of the six, I leave to them two colonies of wood that are nearby the invernada, also equal parts to each one of the six.

— Miss Ambrosina Penna

After the reading of the testament of Miss Ambrosina Penna, each one of the descendants of ex-slave Balbina, inherit a part, where they went live and cultivate their lands. Ernesto had nine sons with his wife Joana da Conceição. Notwithstanding, the marriage between them wasn't stable, and Ernesto go to live in another part of the land.

When Ernesto dies, Joana divides her lands among her descendants. Among Joana's descendant, only two stay on the land while Joana together the other descendants sold the land. One of the descendants stays there, and goes to live with his family in the house where his dad lived, resisting pressure from the nearby farmers who wanted to buy their lands. On that lands, he created his ten descendants, of what resist until nowadays and origined the quilombo Comunidade Arnesto Penna Carneiro.

The quilombo Comunidade Arnesto Penna Carneiro, ocupppy nowadays an area of 1.25 hectares. The quilombo is surrounded by plantations of soya, wheat and rice, of property of Italian descendants families. There live 70 people, distributed for 13 houses, being all descendants of Ernesto Carneiro Penna.

Comunidade Arnesto Penna Carneiro, nowadays, is known and acknowledge as "Negro Community" and as "Quilombo Community", for the more various extern agents, among them are Santa Maria City Hall, Santa Maria Negro Moviment, local press and by Cultural Foundation Palmares. Nevertheless, the denomination of "Quilombola Community Arnesto Penna Carneiro" arouse only in 2006 after someone give input to the process of recognition among the Cultural Foundation Palmares. However, this process was idealized, projected and developed by academics and professors of UNIFRA (Centro Universitário Franciscano), in 2004, through an extension project multidisciplinary.

Whereas, however Comunidade Arnesto Penna Carneiro was constituted from a legate whose form of appropriation have been from private origin and after the slavery regime, through testament, its existence and persistence, for more than a century, enable its inhabitants to plead to Brazilian State:

1. The recognition as quilombo community, by Fundação Cultural Palmares;
2. The property of the land, as Brazilian Constitution.
3. The access to projects of sustentability, preservation and valorization of their historical and cultural patrimonies, as Brazilian Constitution.

== See also ==
- Santa Maria City;
- District of Palma;
- Palma neighbourhood;
- Escola Major Tancredo Penna de Moraes;
- Trans World Radio;
