= Arroio Grande, Santa Maria =

Arroio Grande
- Bairro
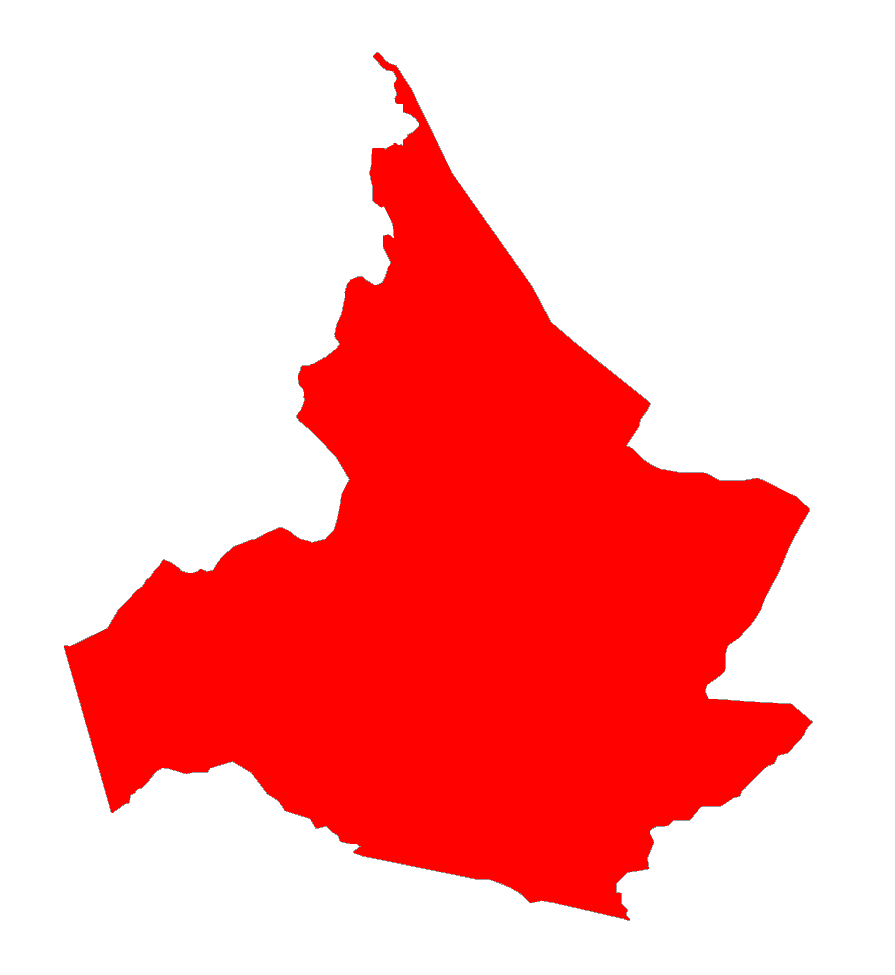
- The bairro in District of Arroio Grande

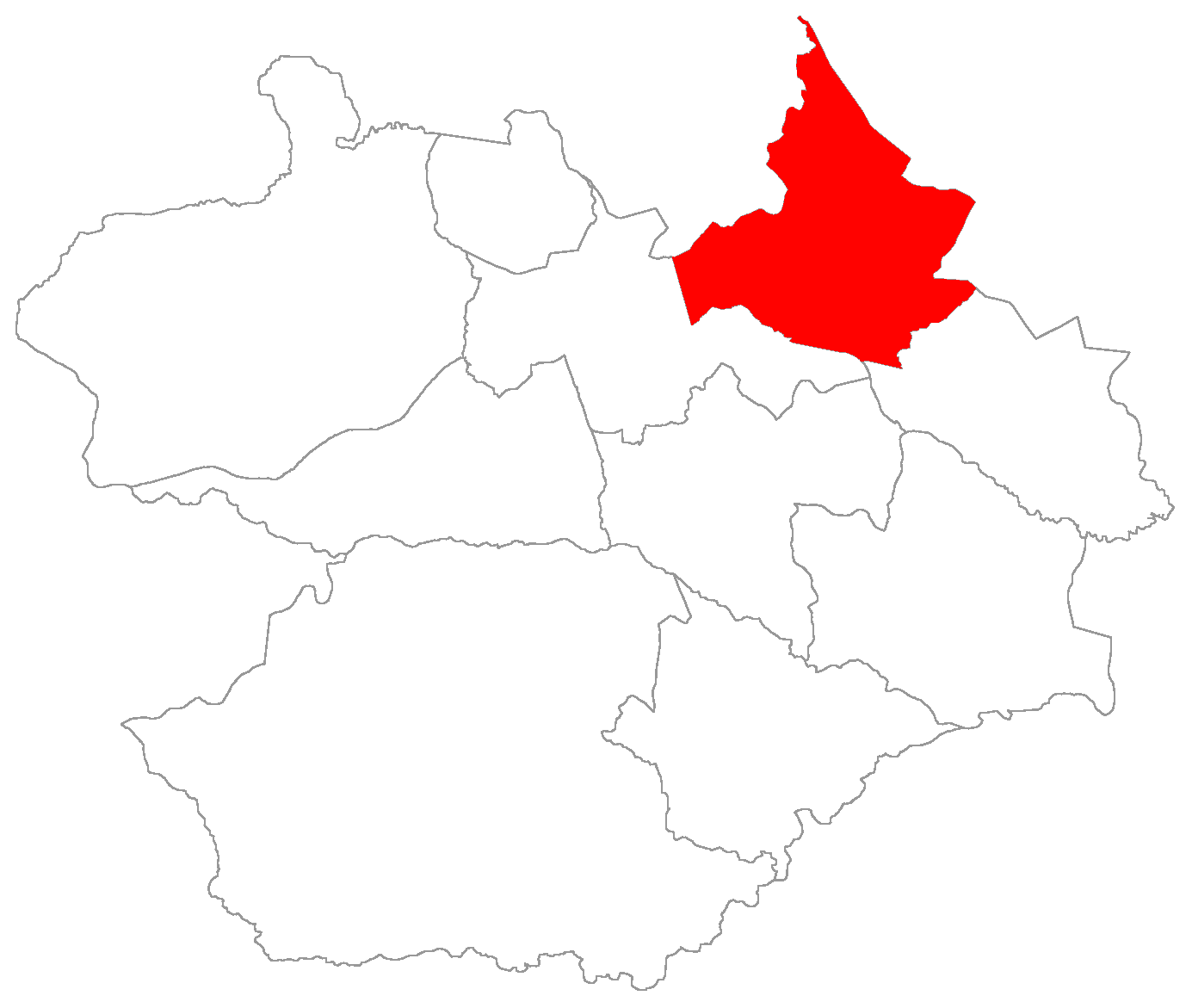
- District of Arroio Grande, in Santa Maria City, Rio Grande do Sul, Brazil
- Coordinates: 29°40′09″S 53°39′47″W
- Country: Brazil
- State: Rio Grande do Sul
- Municipality/City: Santa Maria
- District: District of Arroio Grande

Area
  - Total: 130.71 km^{2} (50.47 sq mi)

Population
  - Total: 2,702
  - Density: 20.67/km^{2} (53.54/sq mi)
- Postal code: 97.120-000
- Adjacent bairros: Camobi, Km 3, Palma, Pé de Plátano
- Website: Official site of Santa Maria

Arroio Grande ("big rivulet") is a bairro in the District of Arroio Grande in the municipality of Santa Maria, in the Brazilian state of Rio Grande do Sul. It is situated in northeast of Santa Maria.

== Villages ==
The bairro contains the following villages: Arroio do Meio, Arroio Grande, Arroio Lobato, Cidade dos Meninos, Colônia Nova, Faxinal da Palma, Kipper, Linha Canudos, Noal, Nossa Senhora da Saúde, Rosalino Noal, São Marcos, São Valentin, Três Barras, Vila Arroio Grande, Vila Fighera, Vila Santa Brígida.

== Gallery of photos ==
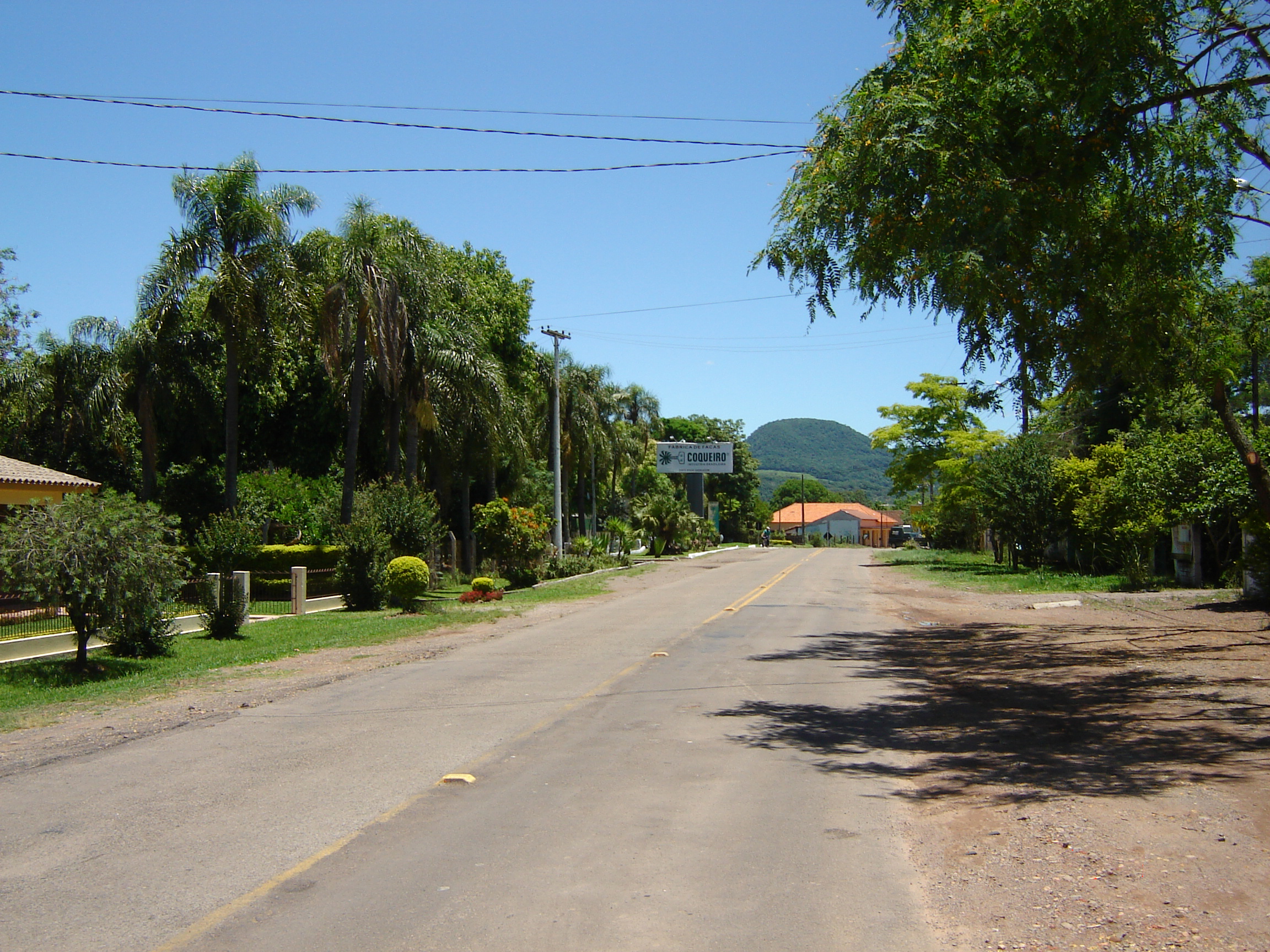

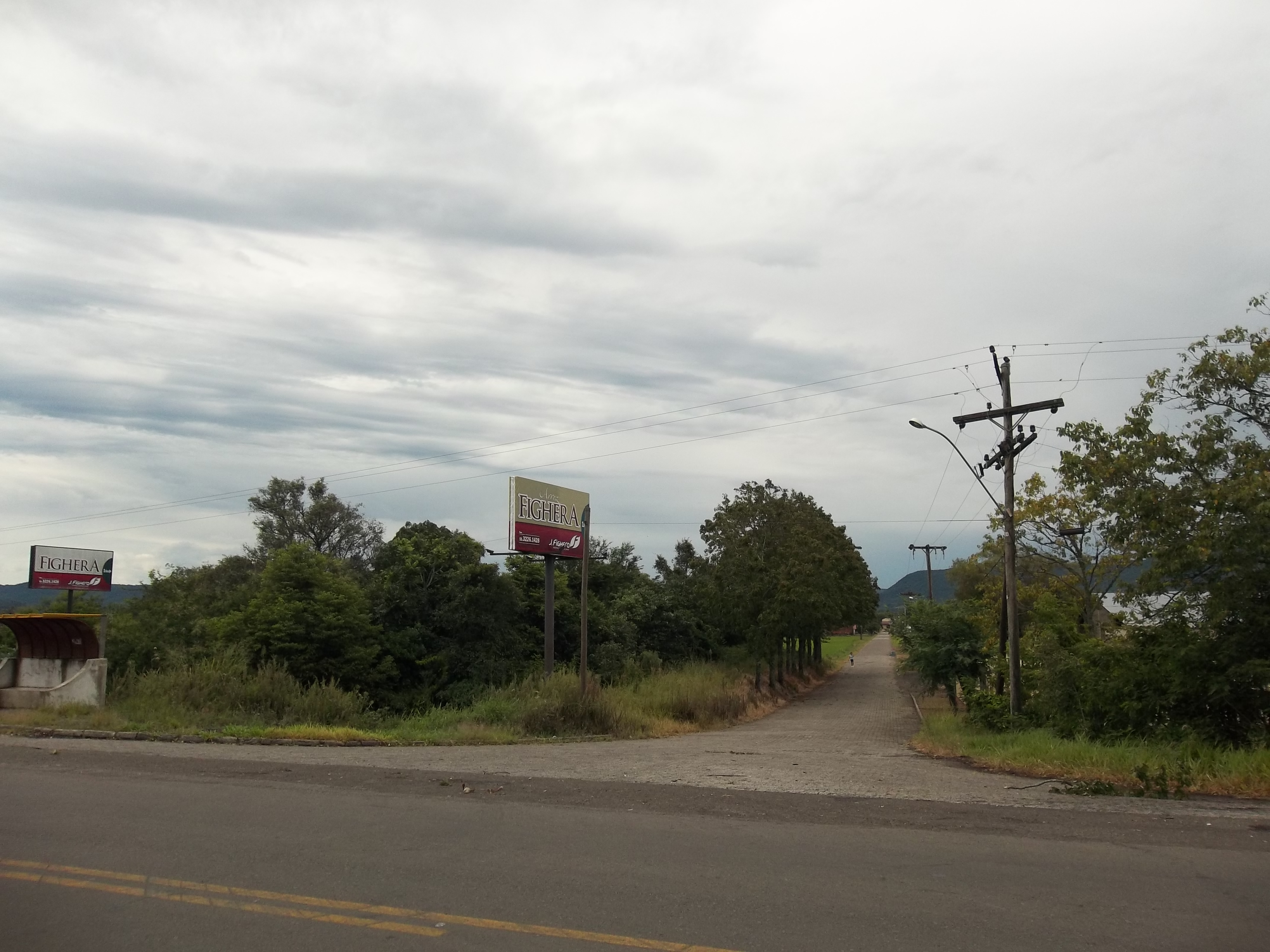

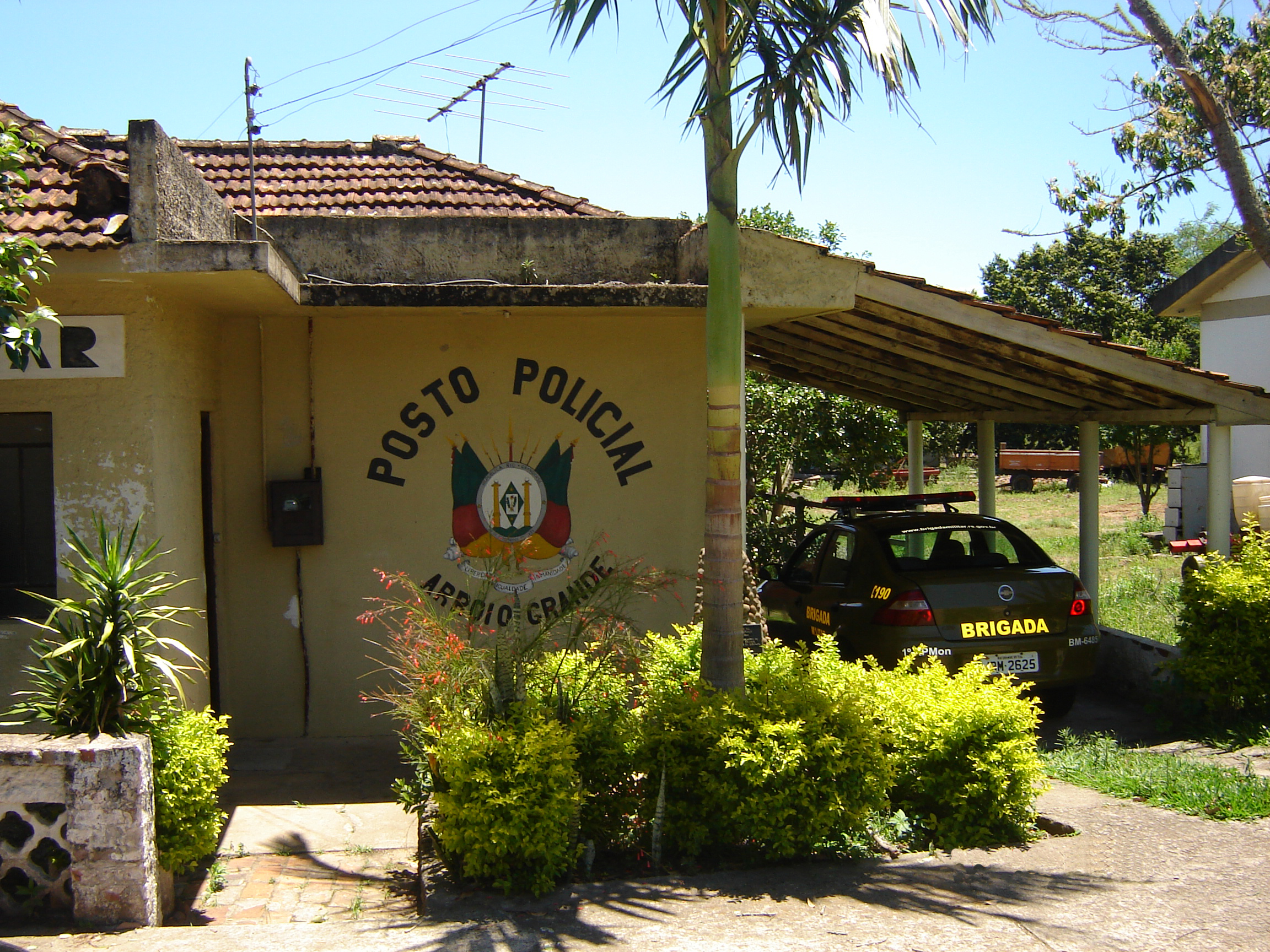

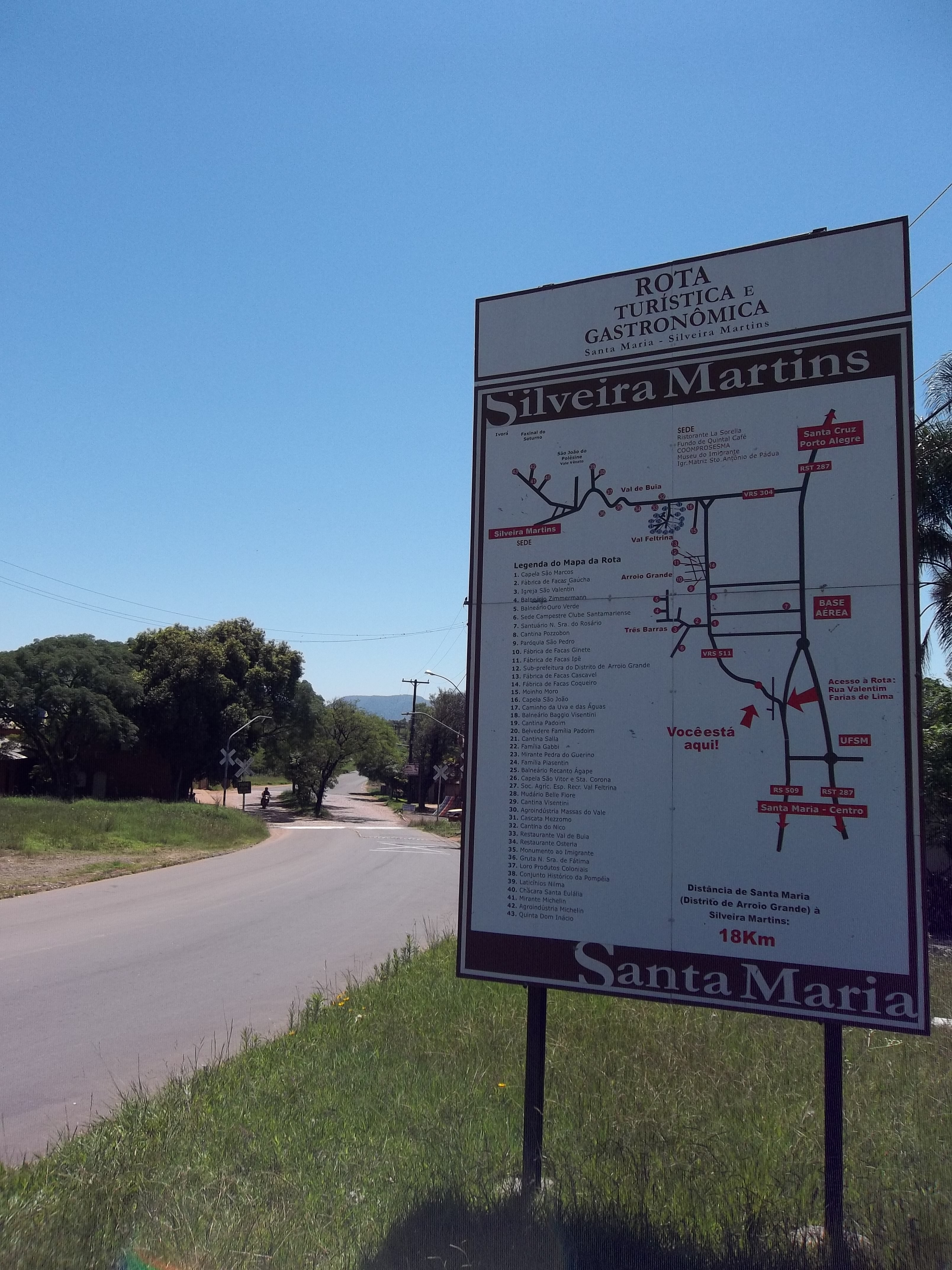
