= São José, Santa Maria =

São José
- Bairro
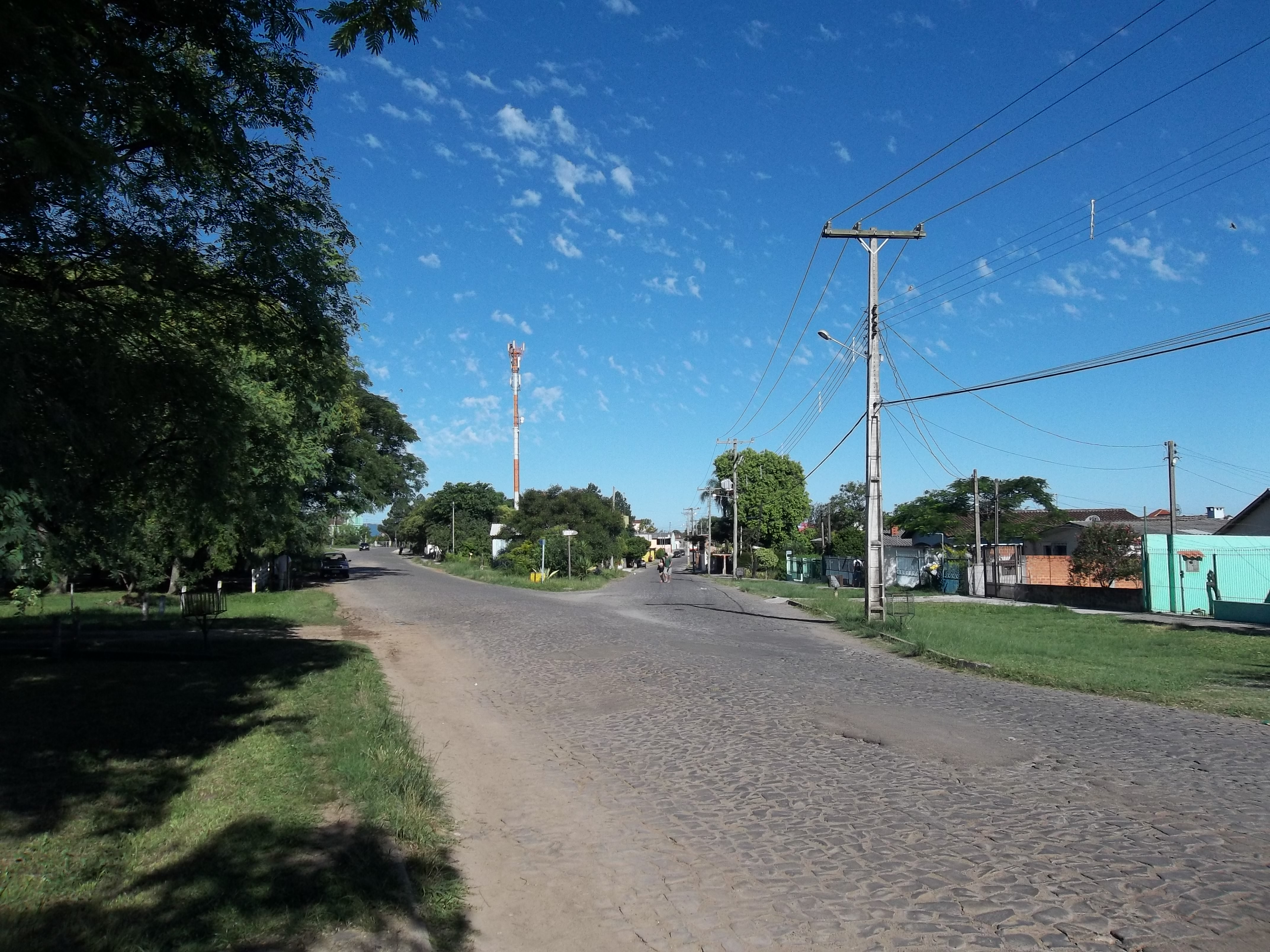

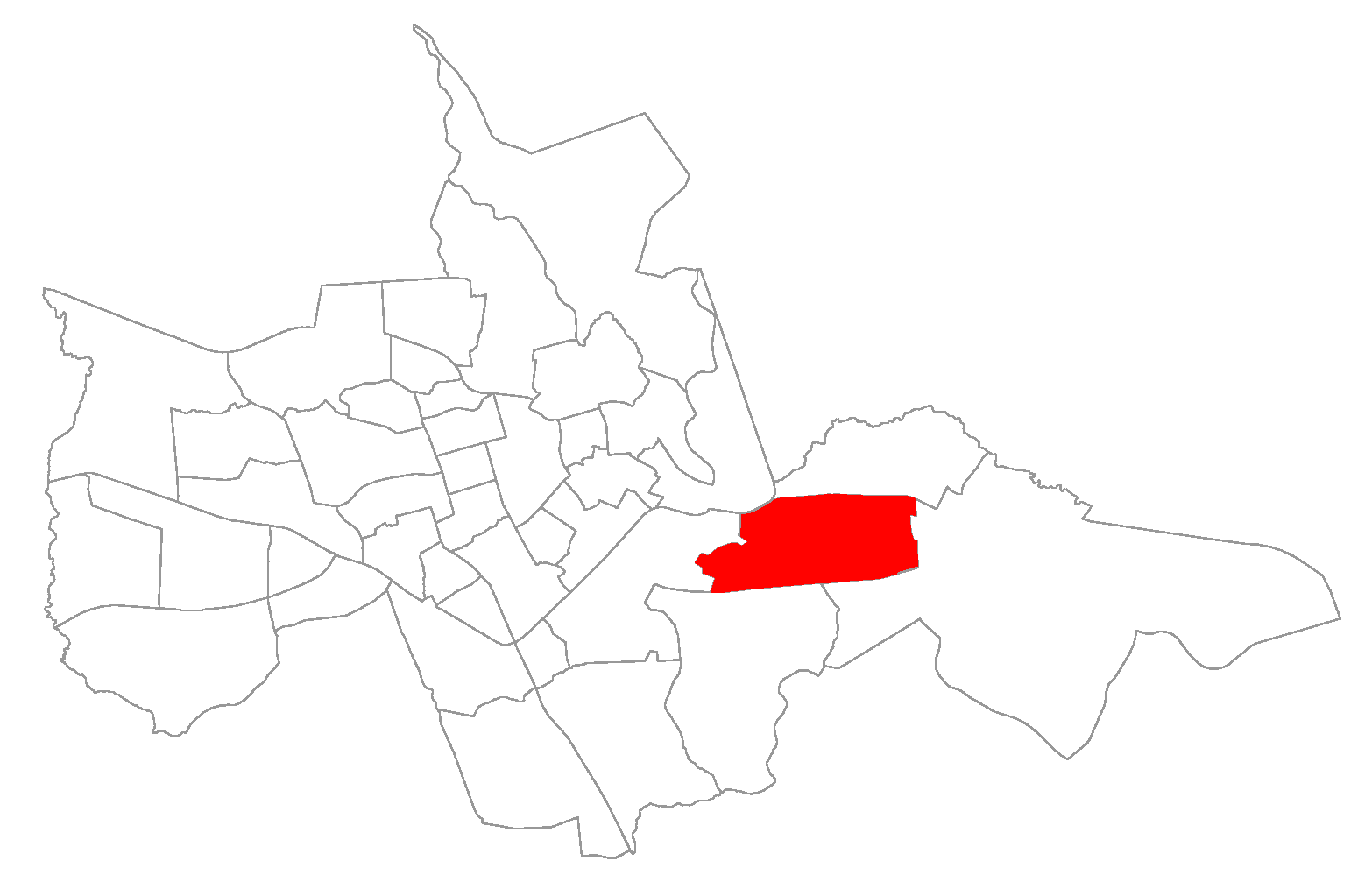
- The bairro in District of Sede

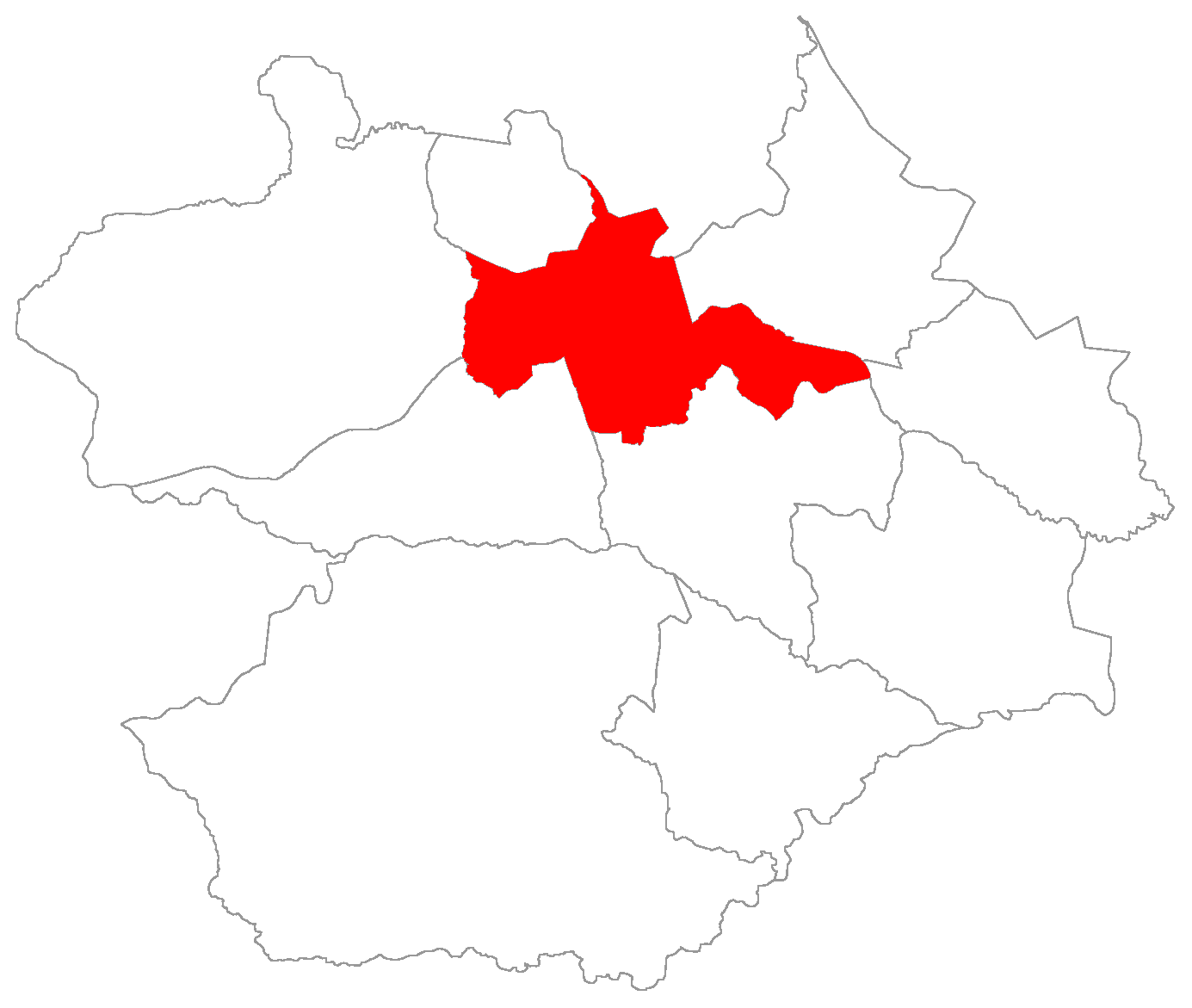
- District of Sede, in Santa Maria City, Rio Grande do Sul, Brazil
- Coordinates: 29°42′07.98″S 53°45′17.30″W
- Country: Brazil
- State: Rio Grande do Sul
- Municipality/City: Santa Maria
- District: District of Sede

Area
  - Total: 4.5880 km^{2} (1.7714 sq mi)

Population
  - Total: 5,697
  - Density: 1,242/km^{2} (3,216/sq mi)
- Postal code: 97.095-000 to 97.110-129
- Adjacent bairros: Camobi, Cerrito, Diácono João Luiz Pozzobon, Km 3, Pé de Plátano.
- Website: www.santamaria.rs.gov.br

São José ("Saint Joseph") is a bairro in the District of Sede in the municipality of Santa Maria, in the Brazilian state of Rio Grande do Sul. It is located in east Santa Maria.

== Villages ==
The bairro contains the following villages: Jardim Lindóia, Loteamento Barroso, Parque do Sol, São José, Vila Farroupilha, Vila Figueira, Vila Sarandi, Vila Sargento Dornelles.
