= Camobi =

- Bairro
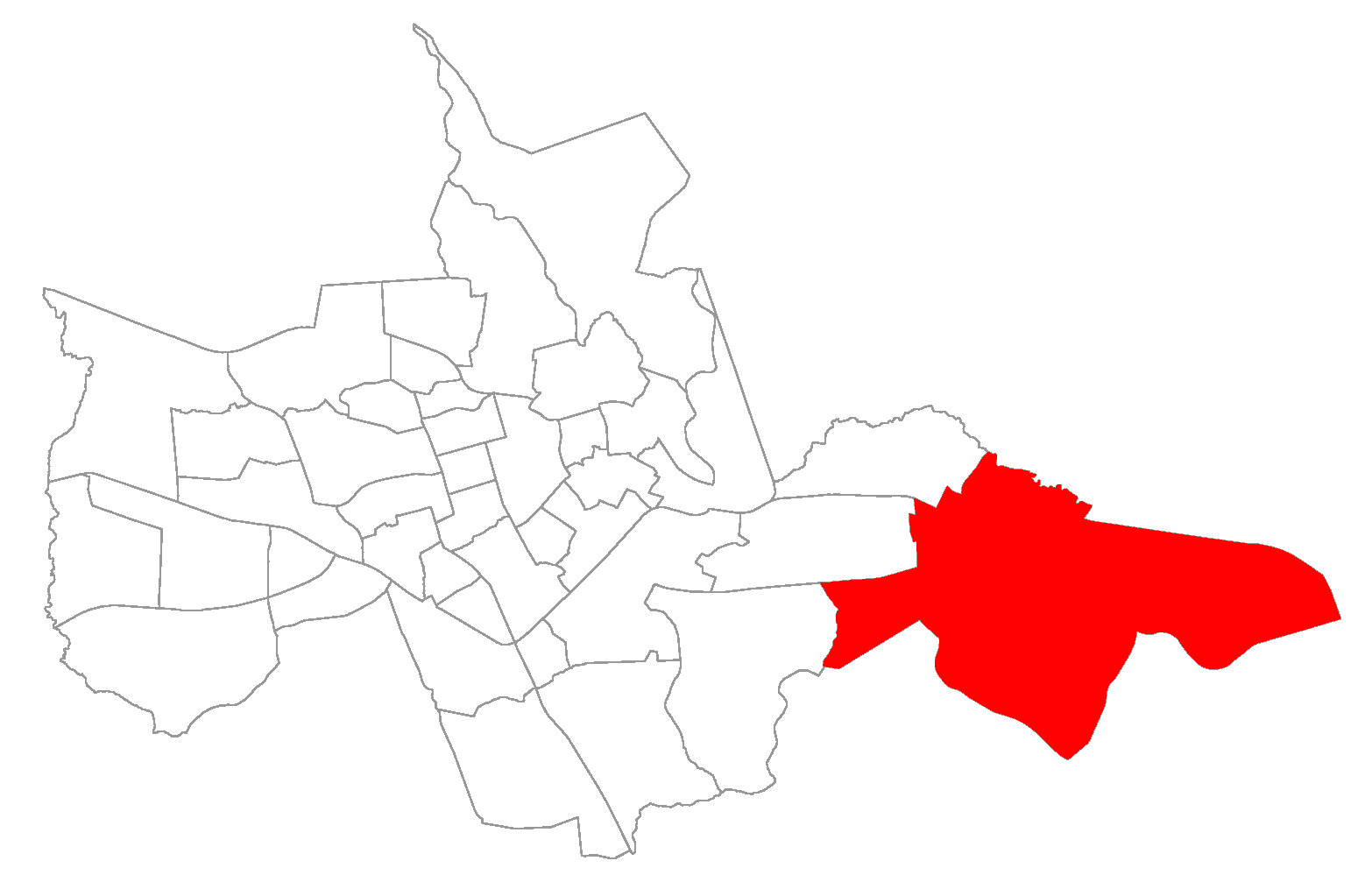
- The bairro in District of Sede

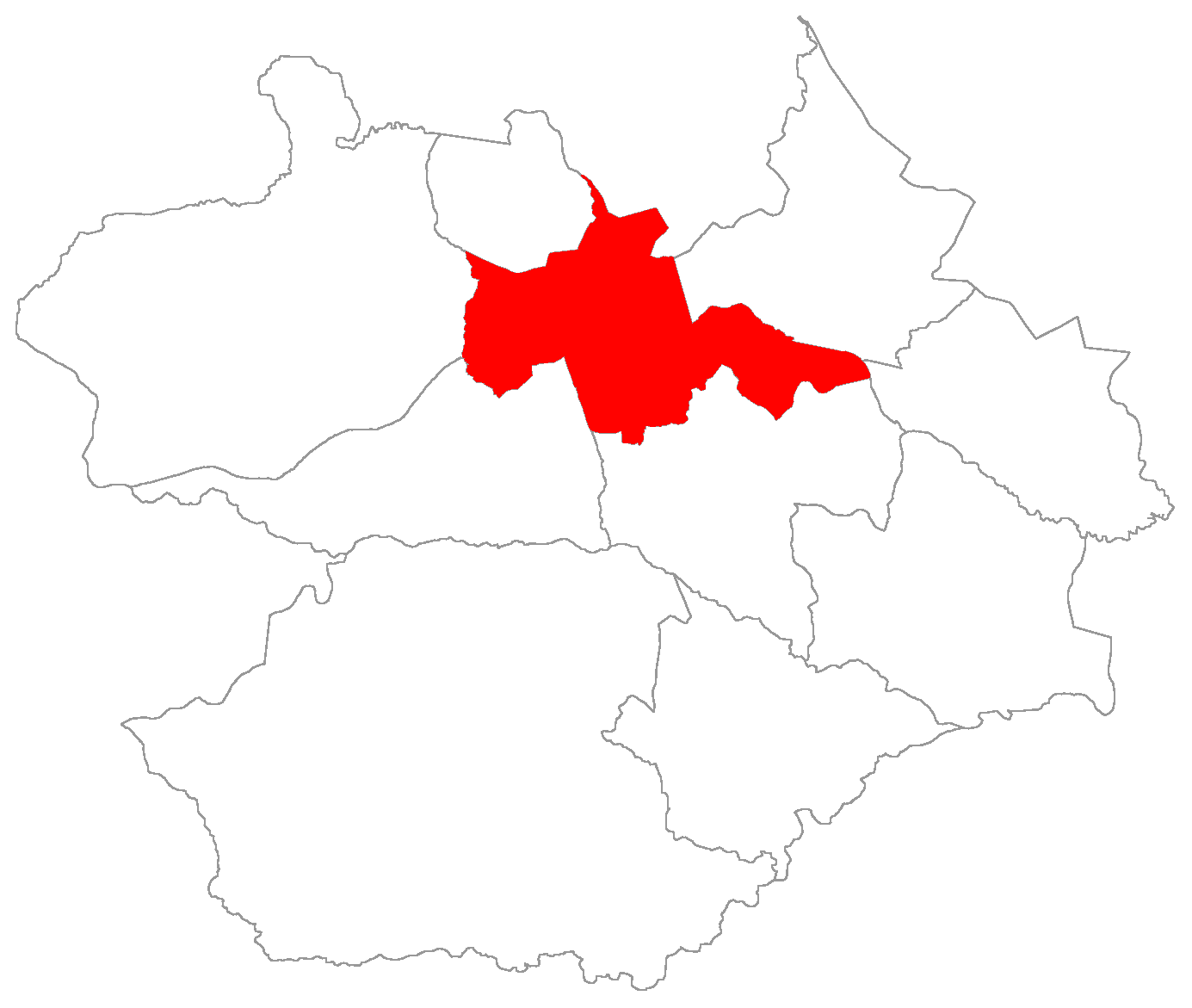
- District of Sede, in Santa Maria, Rio Grande do Sul, Brazil
- Coordinates: 29°42′07.77″S 53°43′16.07″W
- Country: Brazil
- State: Rio Grande do Sul
- Municipality/City: Santa Maria
- District: District of Sede

Area
  - Total: 20.5186 km^{2} (7.9223 sq mi)

Population
  - Total: 21,822
  - Density: 1,063.5/km^{2} (2,754.5/sq mi)
- Postal code: 97.105-000 to 97.110-899
- Adjacent bairros: Arroio Grande, Diácono João Luiz Pozzobon, Pains, Palma, Pé de Plátano, São José.
- Website: Official site of Santa Maria

Camobi - is a bairro in the District of Sede in the municipality of Santa Maria, in the Brazilian state of Rio Grande do Sul. It is located in east Santa Maria.

== Villages ==
The bairro contains the following villages: Santa Maria Air Force Base, Camobi, Condomínio Residencial Novo Horizonte, Condomínio Vila Verde, Estação Colônia, Loteamento Behr, Loteamento Carlos Gomes, Loteamento Grazziotin, Loteamento Irmão Leão, Loteamento Martins da Silva, Loteamento Monfardini, Loteamento São José, Núcleo Habitacional Fernando Ferrari, Parque Residencial Alto da Colina, Parque Residencial Amaral, Parque Residencial Camobi, Parque Residencial Fiori D'Itália, Parque Residencial Monte Carlo, Parque Residencial Novo Horizonte, Parque Residencial Santa Lúcia, Parque Residencial Universitário, Petit Village, Universidade Federal de Santa Maria, Vila Almeida, Vila Assunção, Vila do Canto, Vila Jardim, Vila Progresso, Vila Santa Helena, Vila Santos Dumont, Vila Soares do Canto, Vila Tereza, Vila Tonetto, Vila Vitório Rossato.

== Gallery of photos ==
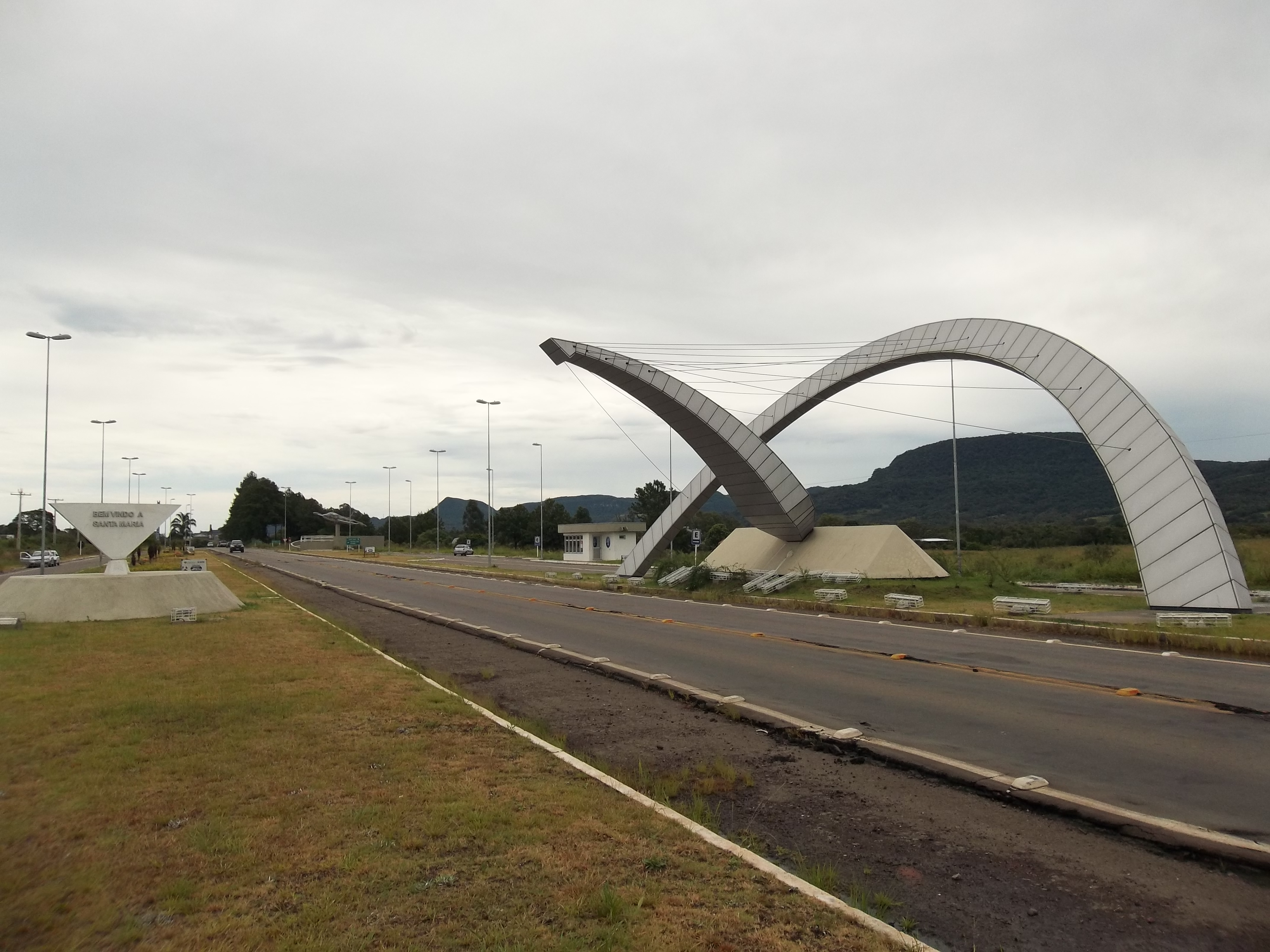

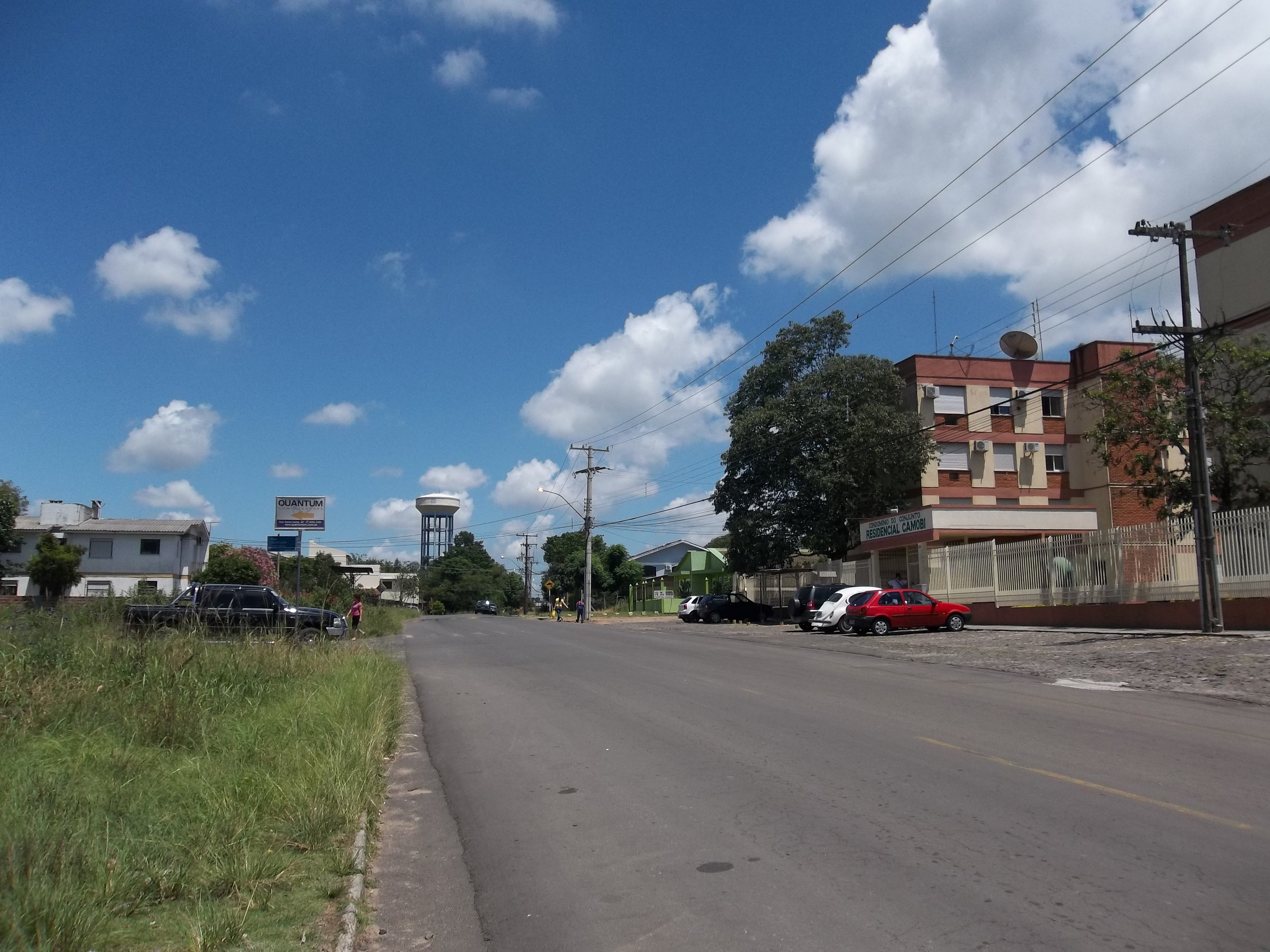

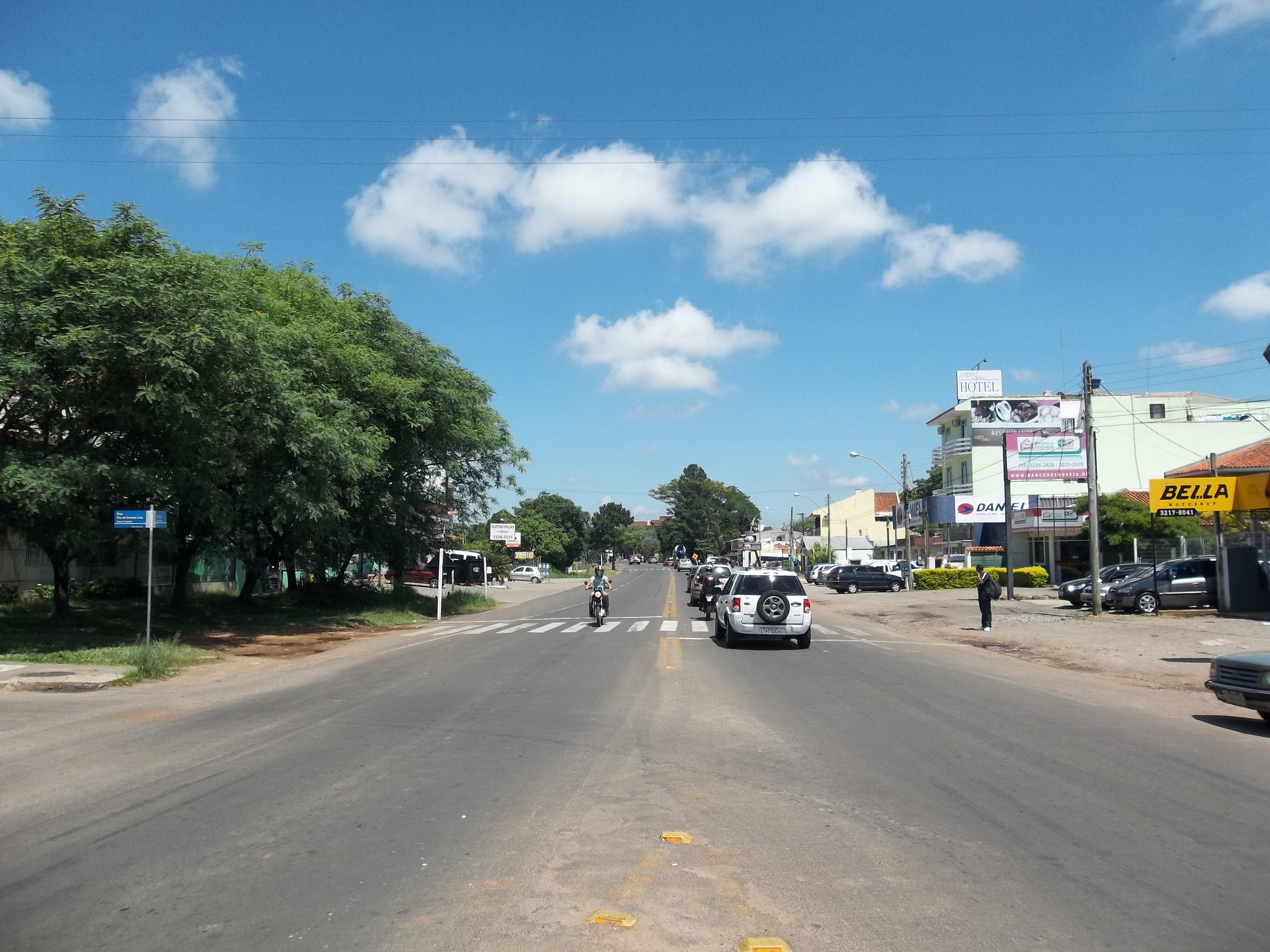

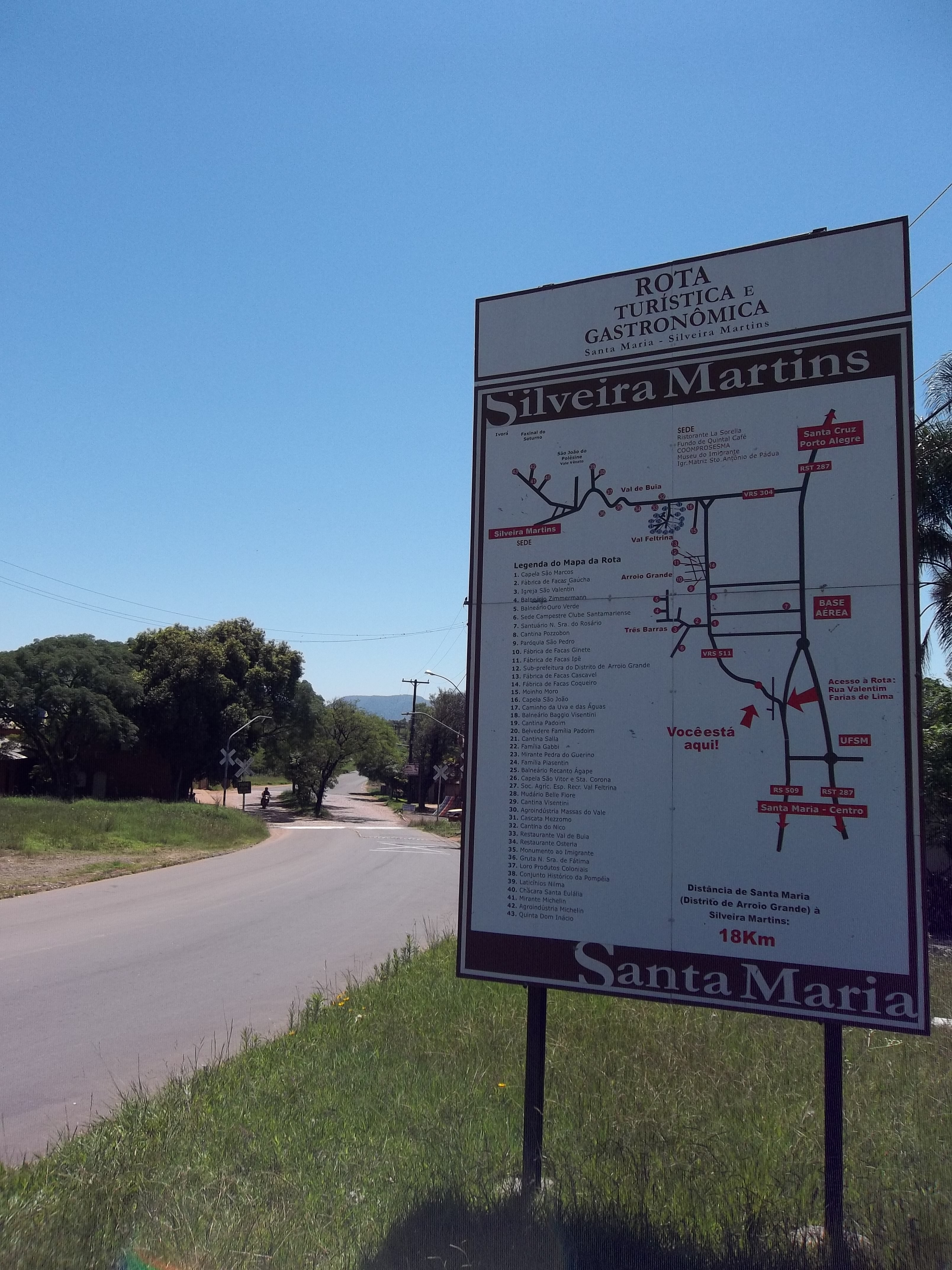

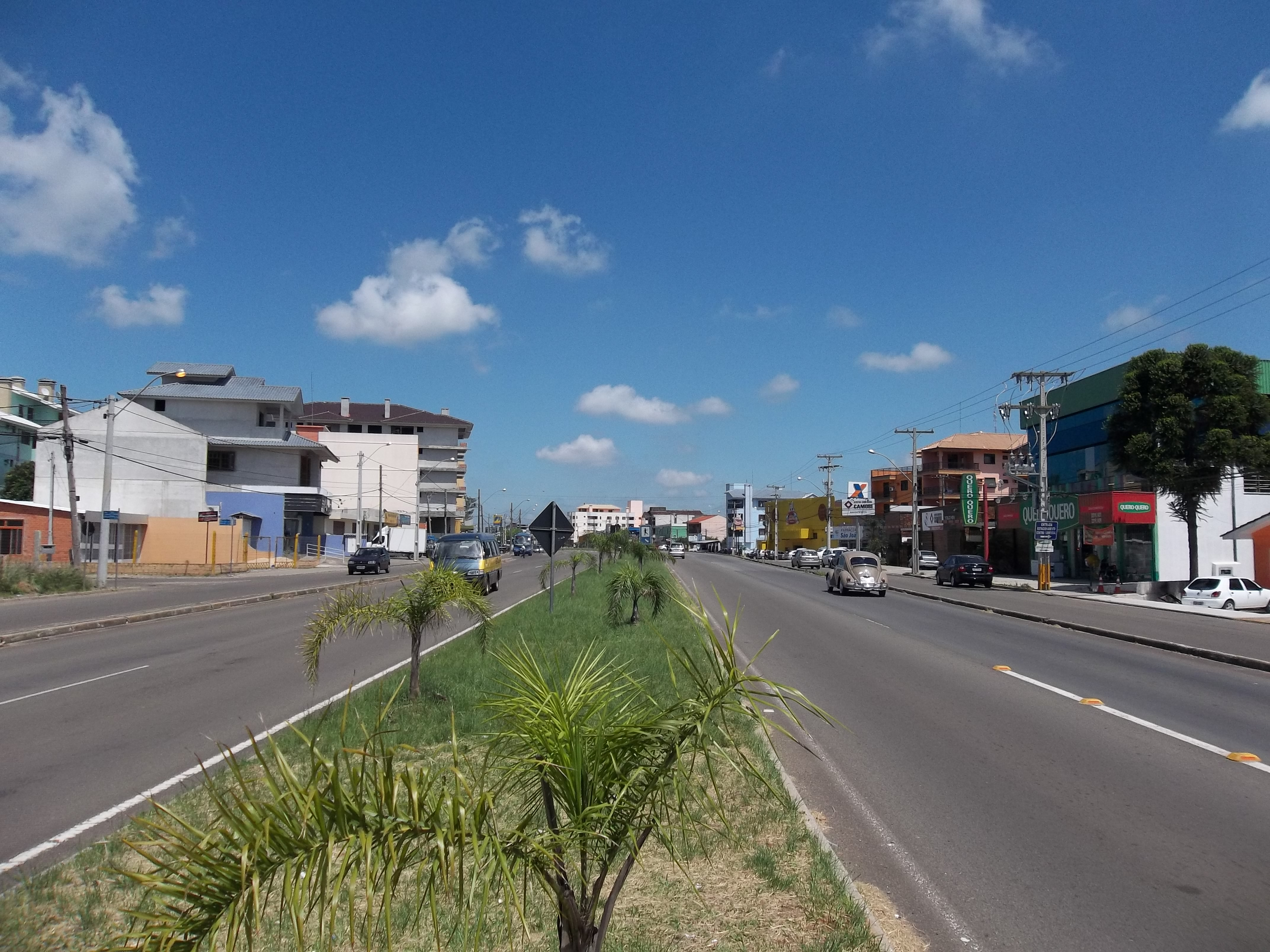

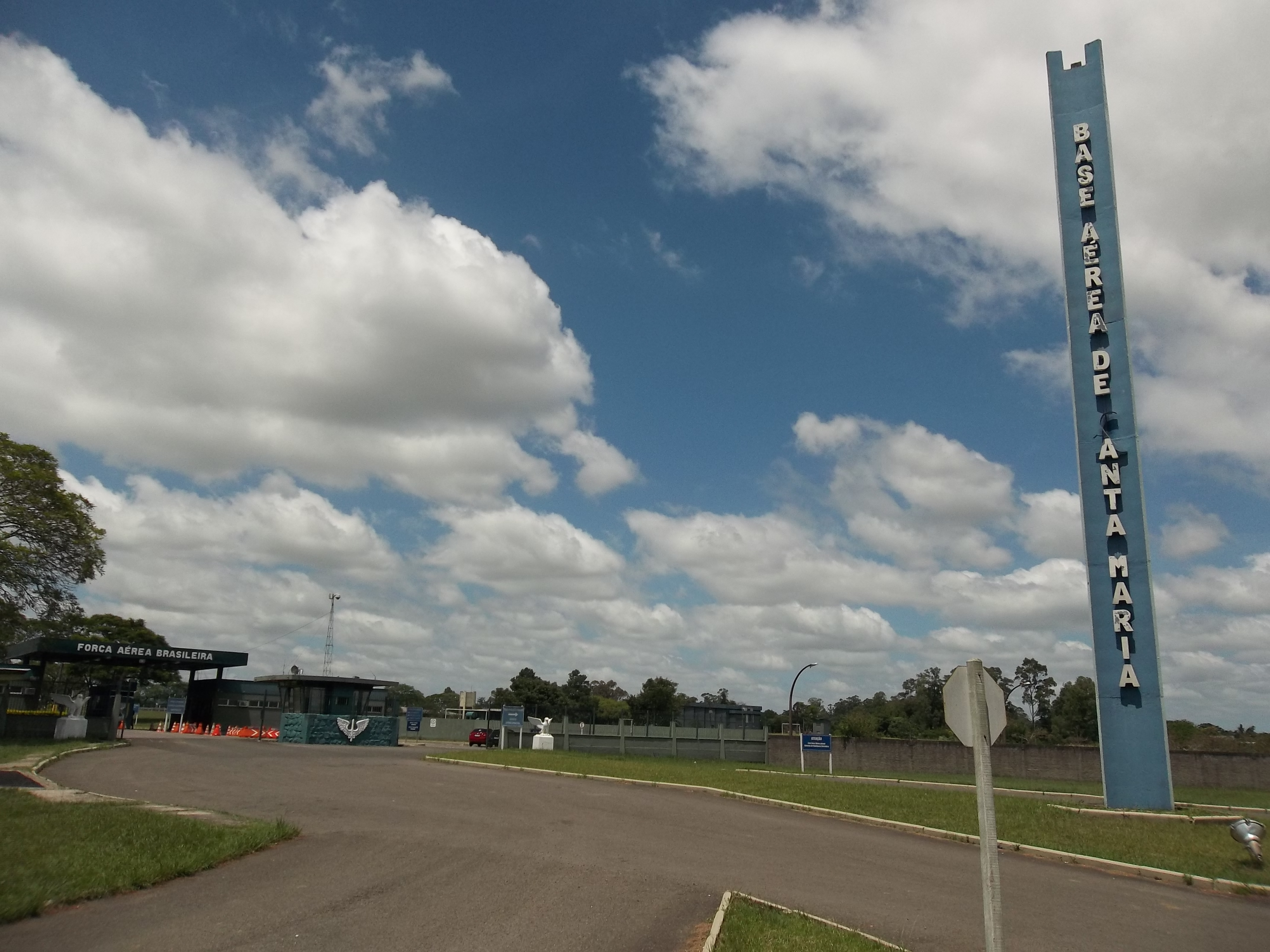

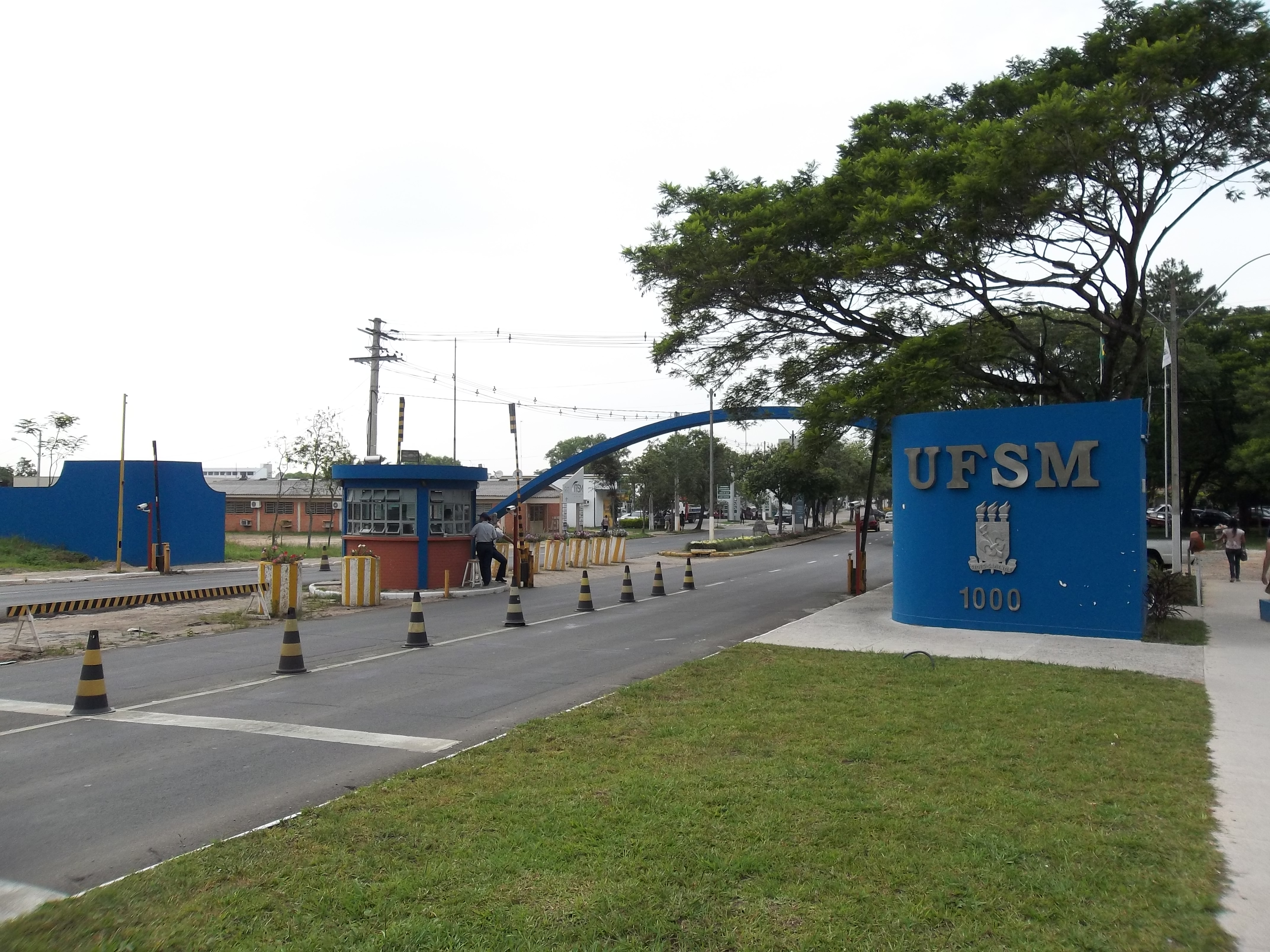

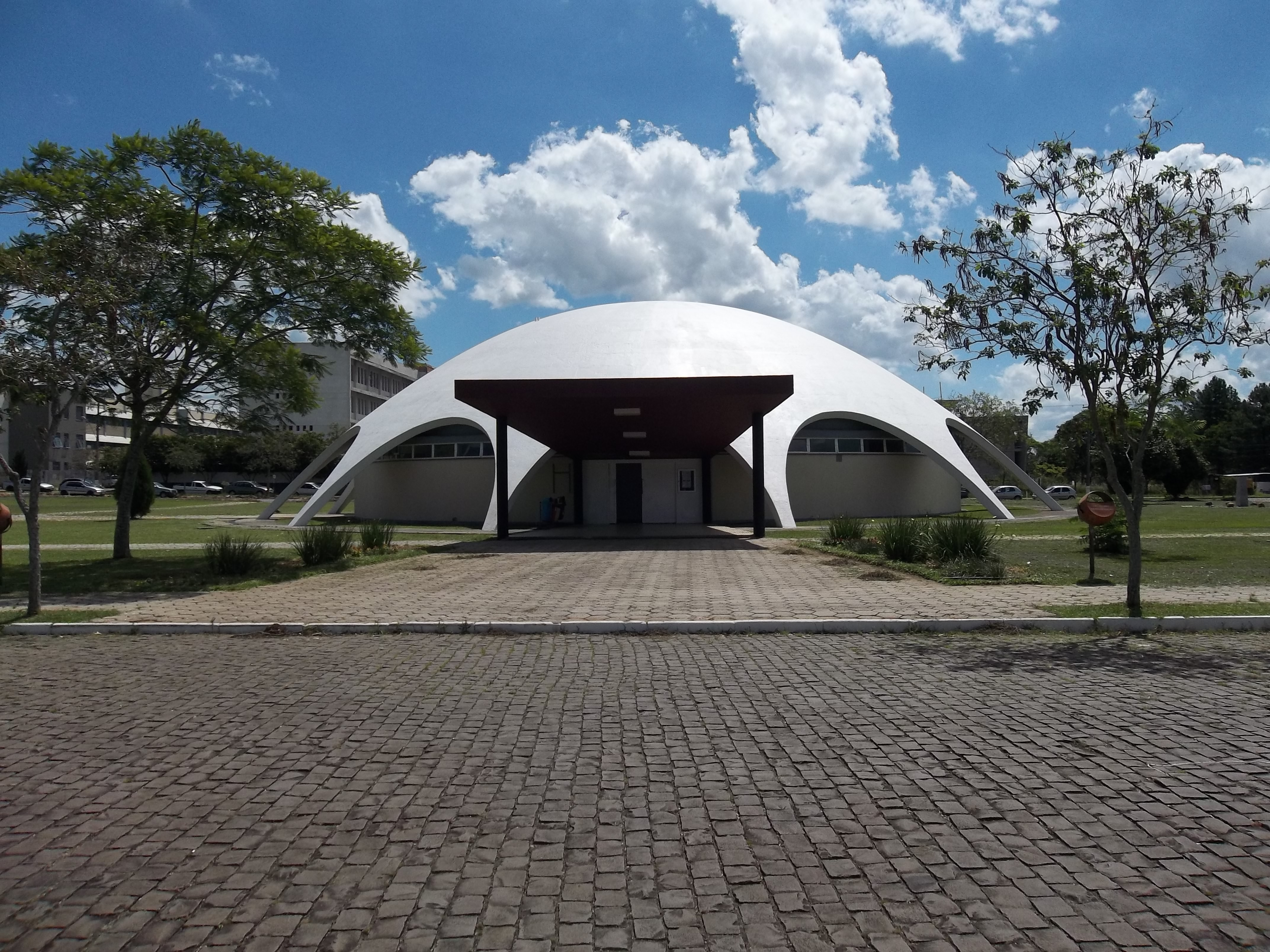

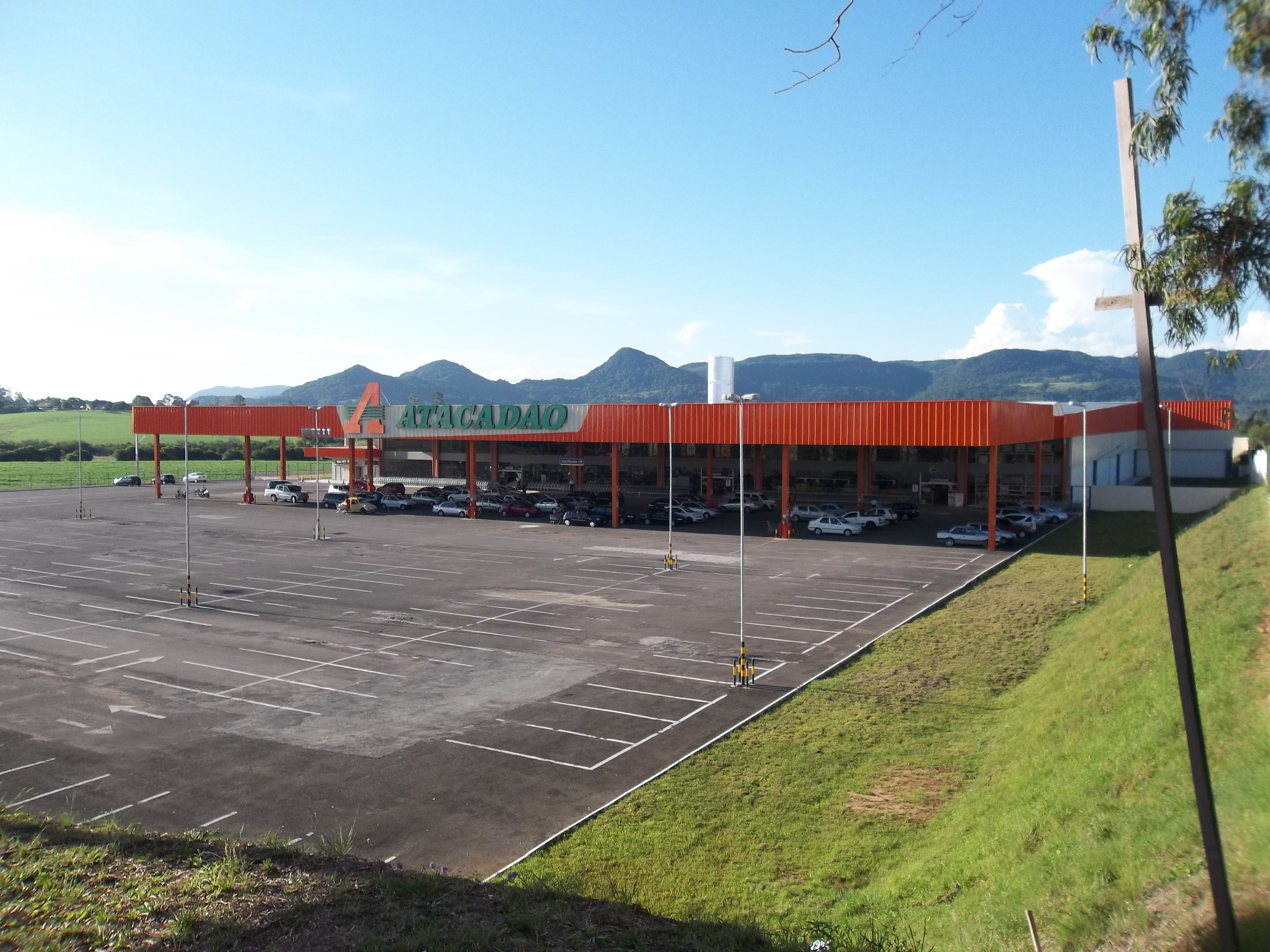

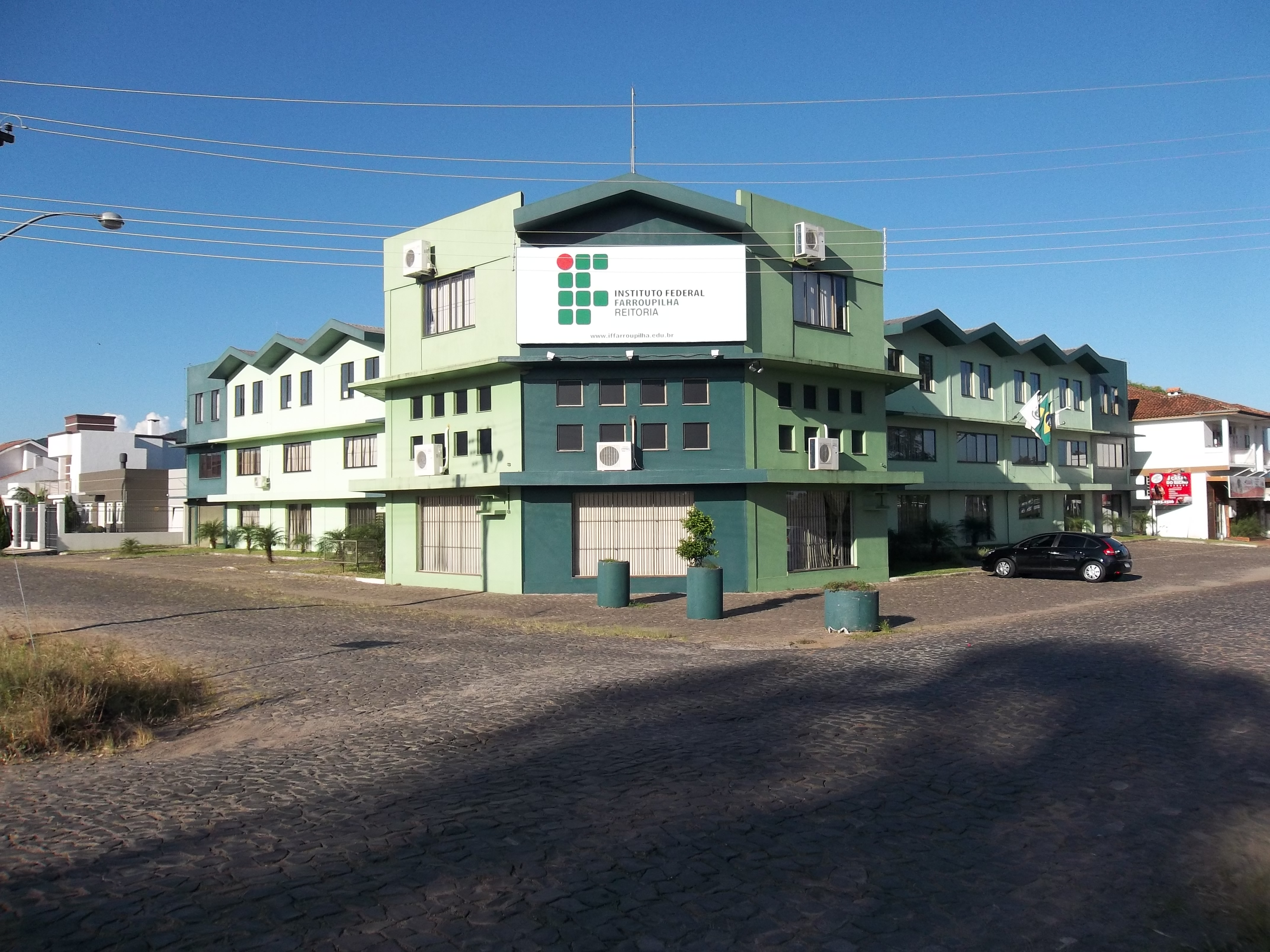

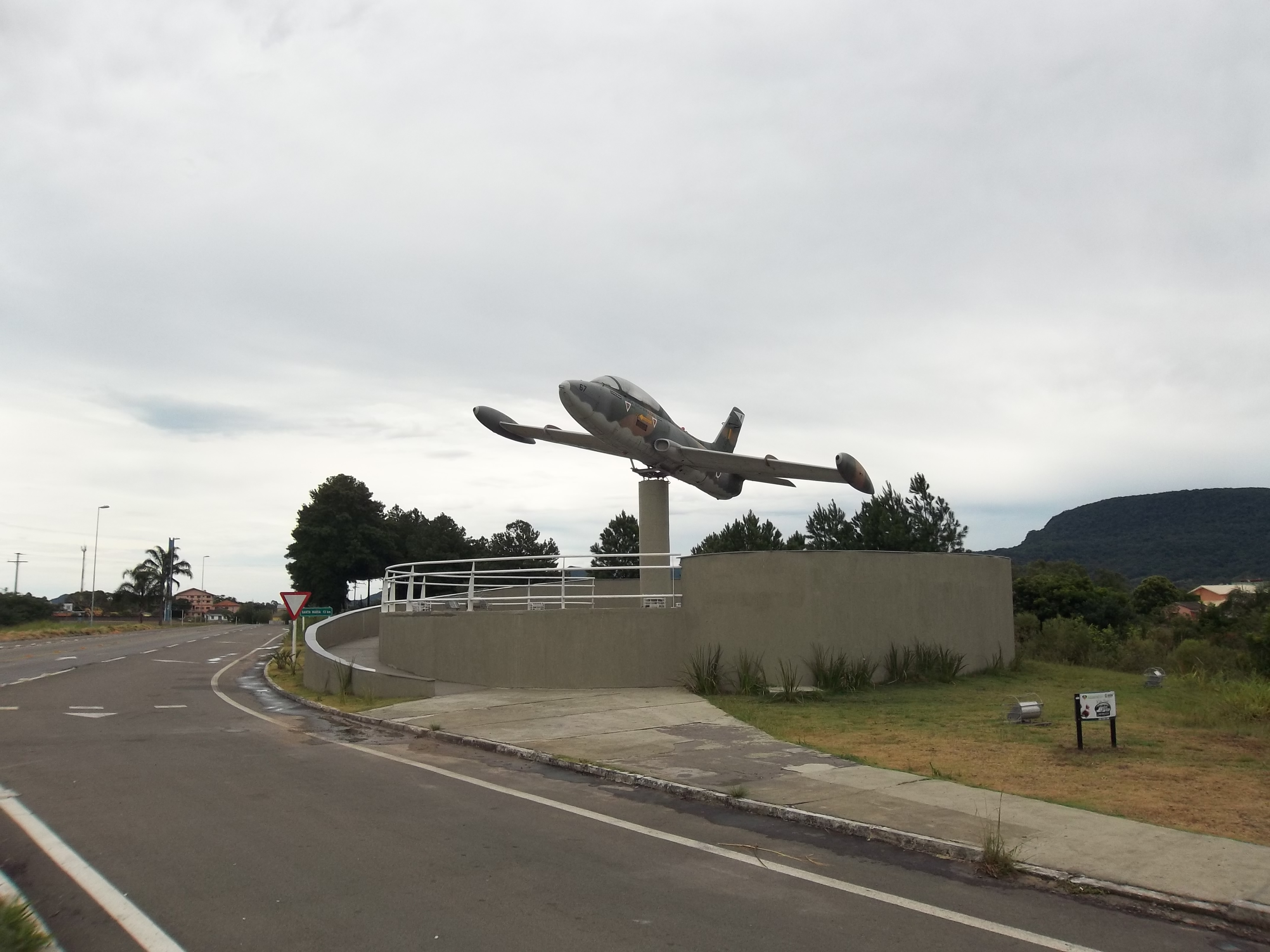
