= Pé de Plátano =

- Bairro
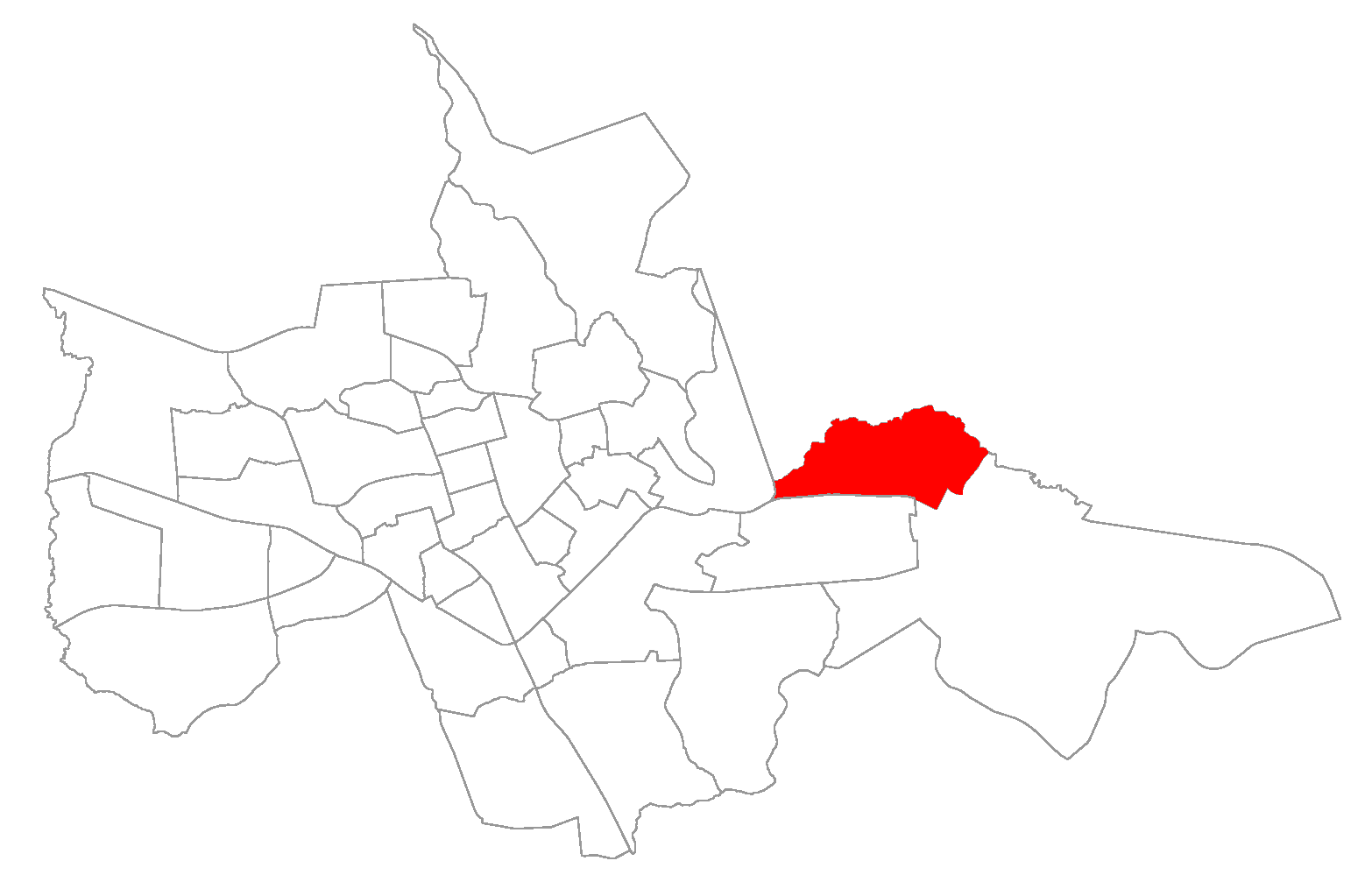
- The bairro in District of Sede

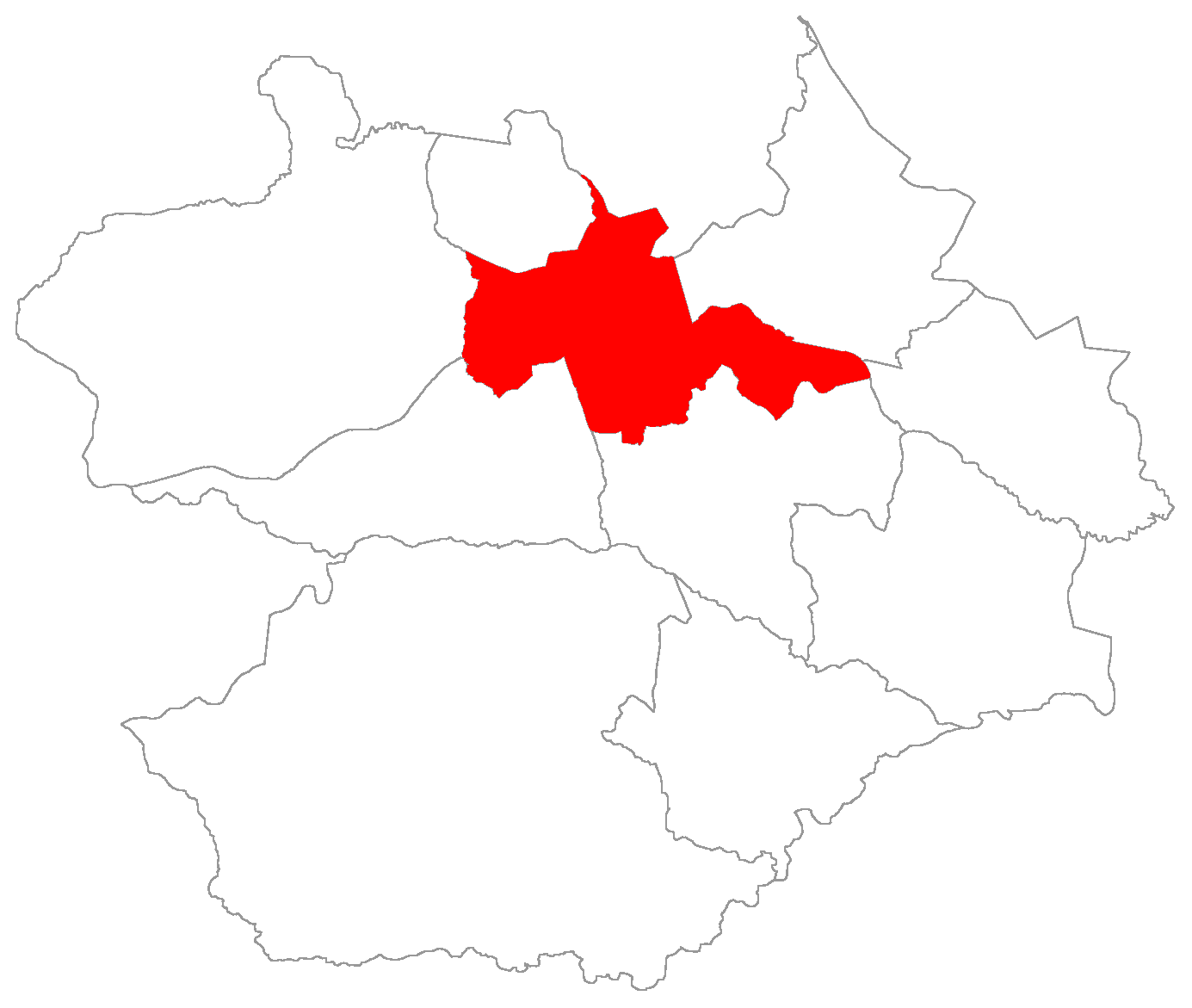
- District of Sede, in Santa Maria City, Rio Grande do Sul, Brazil
- Coordinates: 29°41′24.00″S 53°44′36.66″W
- Country: Brazil
- State: Rio Grande do Sul
- Municipality/City: Santa Maria
- District: District of Sede

Area
  - Total: 3.8004 km^{2} (1.4673 sq mi)

Population
  - Total: 2,200
  - Density: 580/km^{2} (1,500/sq mi)
- Postal code: 97.110-005 to 97.110-739
- Adjacent bairros: Arroio Grande, Camobi, Km 3, São José.
- Website: Official site of Santa Maria

Pé de Plátano ("platanus tree") is a bairro in the District of Sede in the municipality of Santa Maria, in the Brazilian state of Rio Grande do Sul. It is located in east Santa Maria.

== Villages ==
The bairro contains the following villages: Parque Residencial Ouro Verde, Pé de Plátano, Vila Almeida, Vila Presidente Vargas.

== Gallery of photos ==
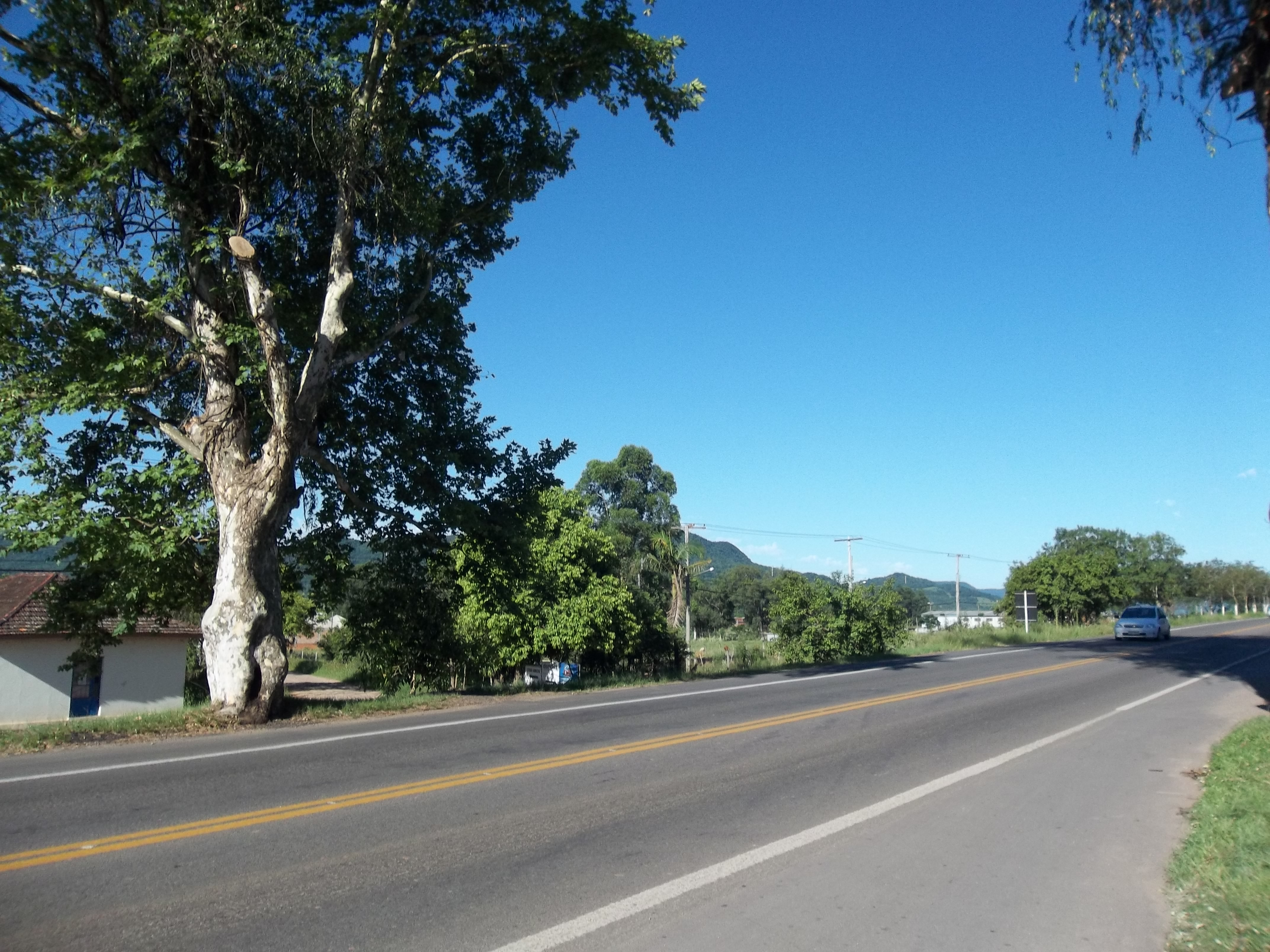
