= Palma, Santa Maria =

Palma
- Bairro
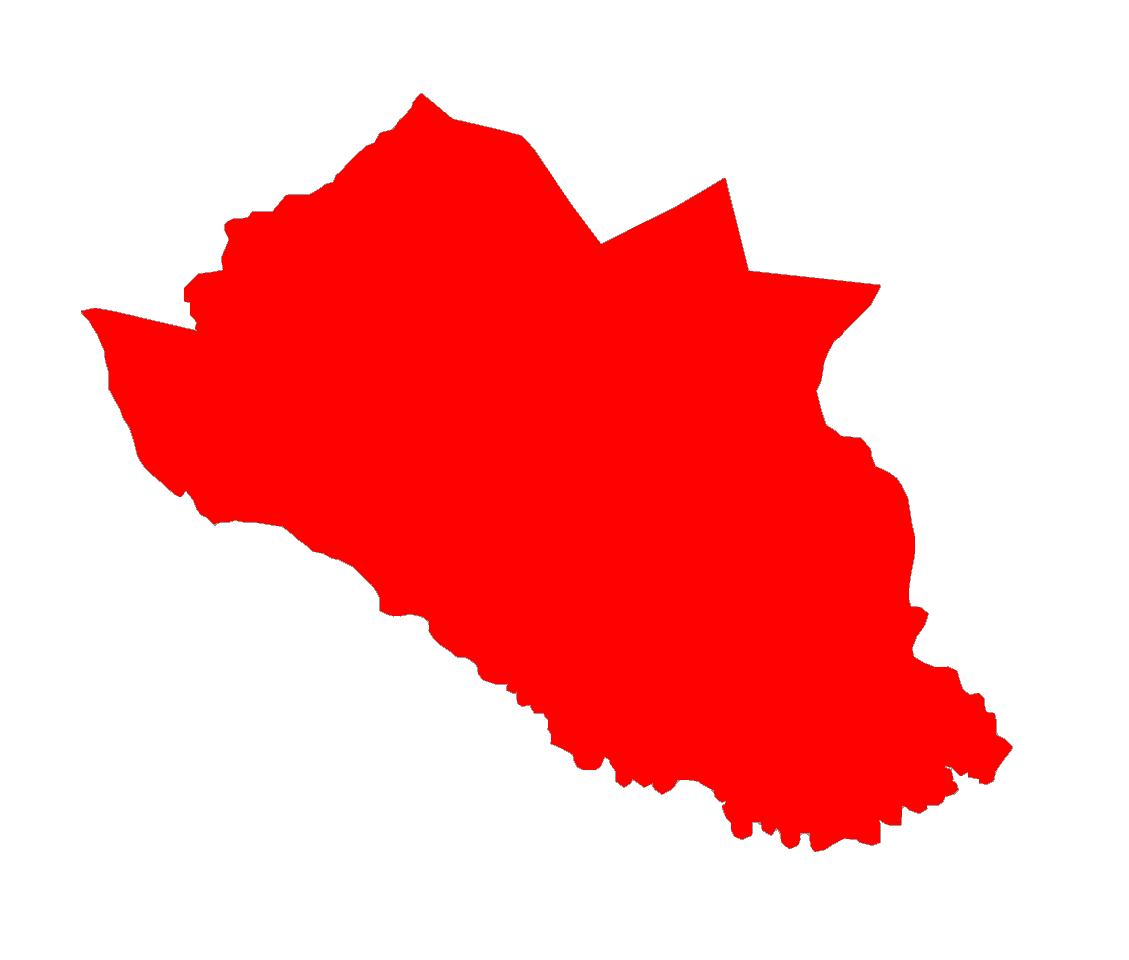
- The bairro in District of Palma

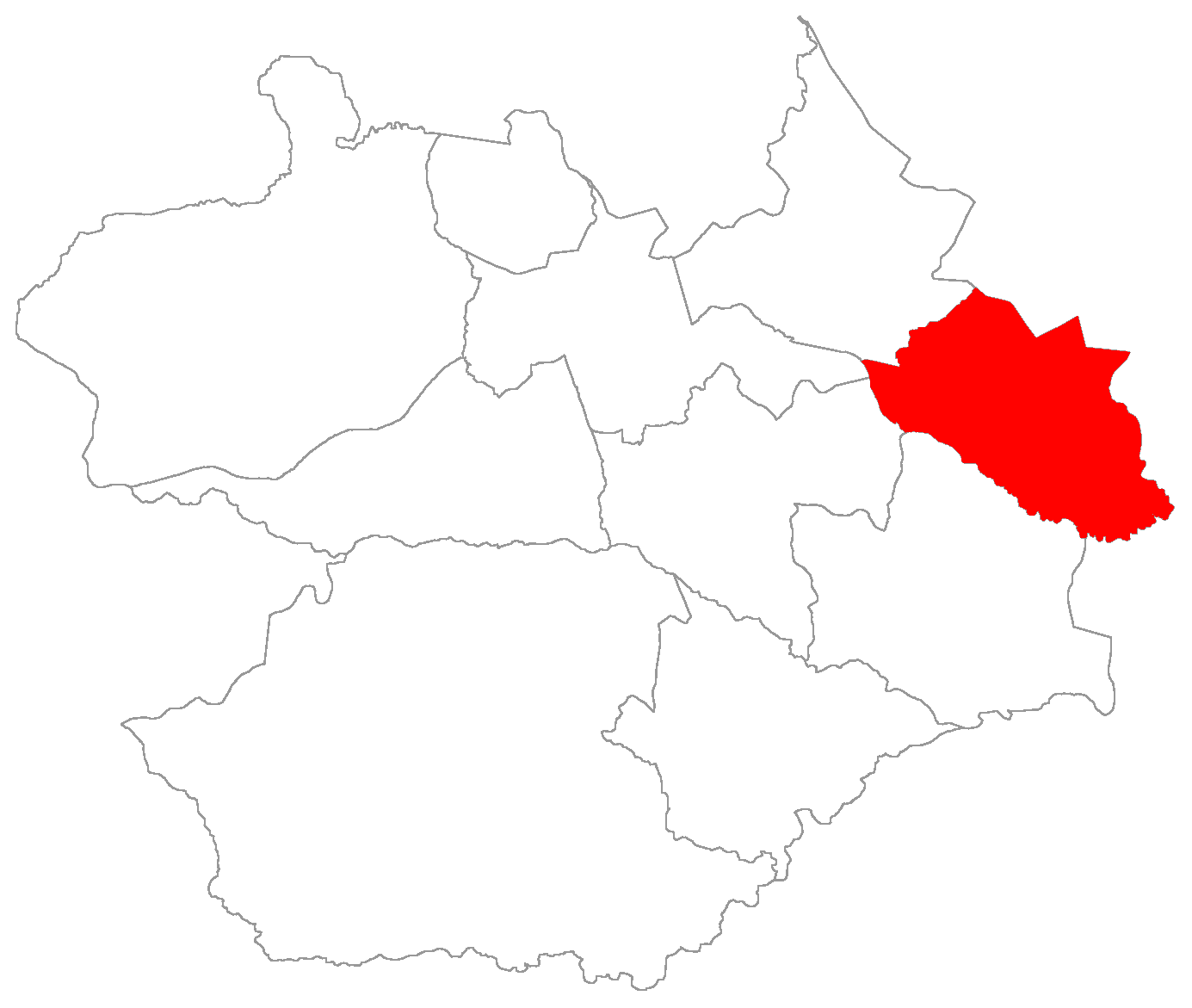
- District of Palma, in Santa Maria City, Rio Grande do Sul, Brazil
- Coordinates: 29°43′27.40″S 53°34′41.84″W
- Country: Brazil
- State: Rio Grande do Sul
- Municipality/City: Santa Maria
- District: District of Palma

Area
  - Total: 95.18 km^{2} (36.75 sq mi)

Population
  - Total: 856
  - Density: 8.99/km^{2} (23.3/sq mi)
- Postal code: 97.130-000
- Adjacent bairros: Arroio do Só, Arroio Grande, Pains, Camobi
- Website: Palma8SM.com, Palma SM's official website Official site of Santa Maria

Palma (Portuguese pronunciation: [ˈpawmɐ], "palm") is a bairro in the District of Palma in the municipality of Santa Maria, in the Brazilian state of Rio Grande do Sul. It is situated in east of Santa Maria.

== Villages ==
The bairro contains the following villages: Comunidade Arnesto Penna Carneiro, Faxinal da Palma, Fazenda Palma, Fazenda Pozzobon, Linha Sete Sul, Loteamento Erondina Toniasso Bassan, Palma, Palmas, Passo do Cachorro, Passo do Gato, Passo dos Preto, Rincão dos Camponogara, Rincão dos Ventura, Santa Lúcia, Santa Teresinha, Santo Antônio, São Sebastião, Vale dos Panno, Vila Almeida, Vila Balconi, Vila Fuganti, Vila Gomes, Vila Palma, Vila Toniasso, Vila Venturini, Vista Alegre.

== Gallery of photos ==
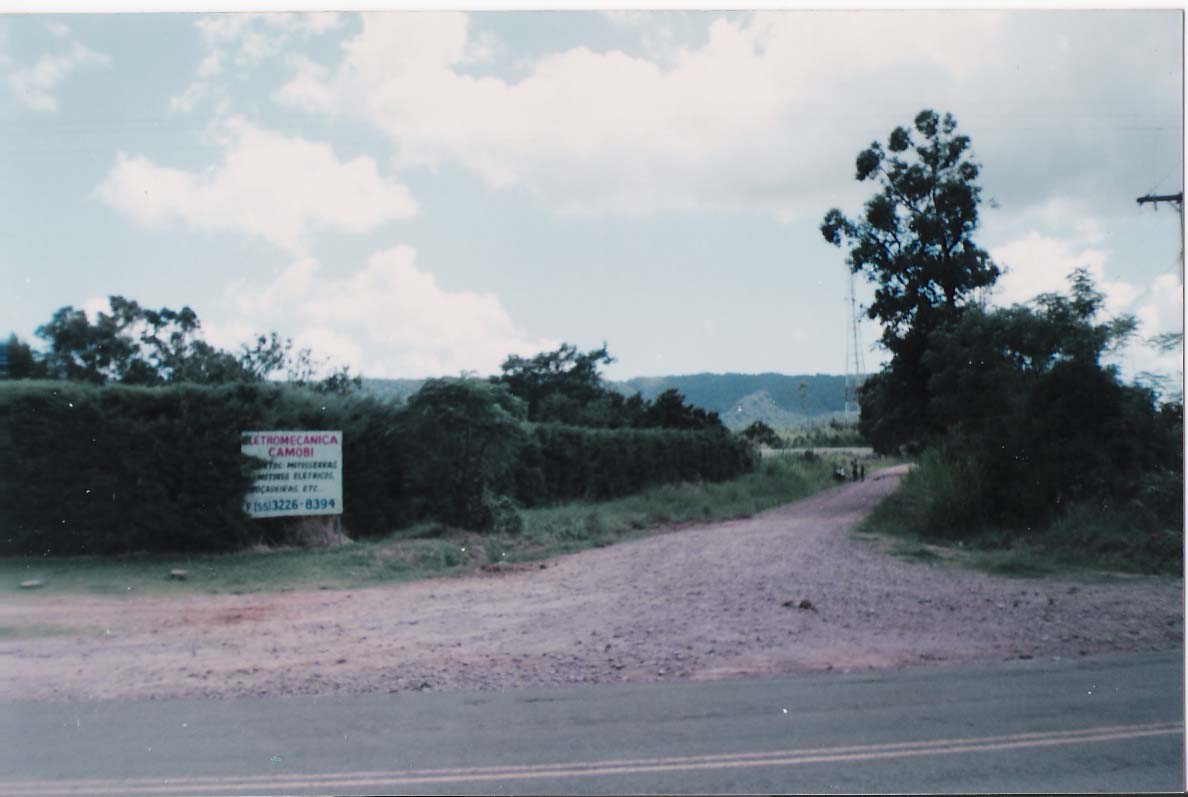

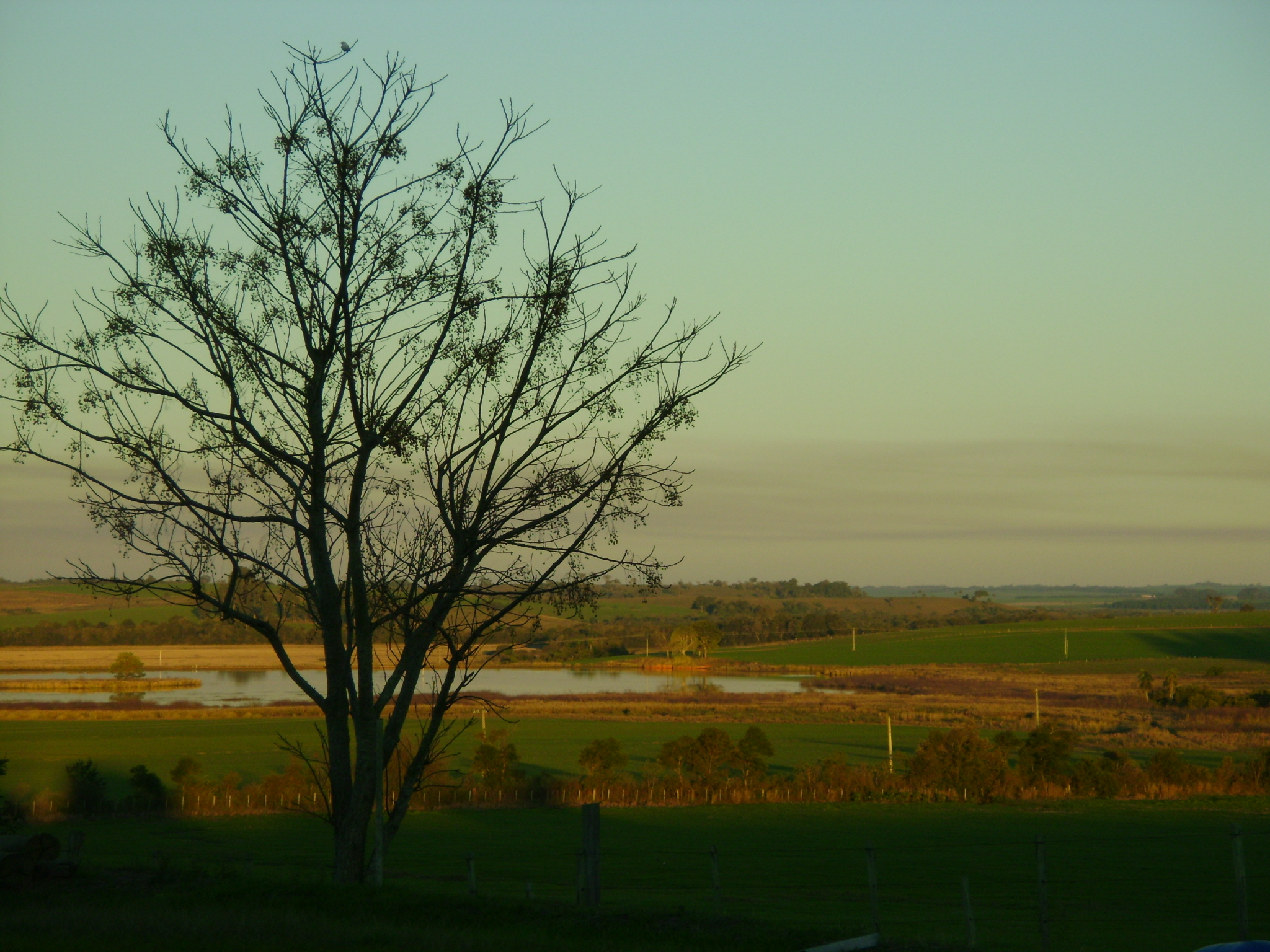

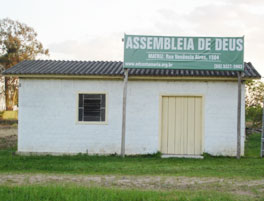

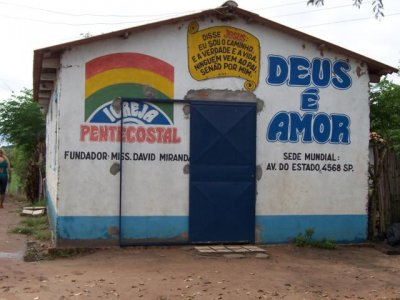

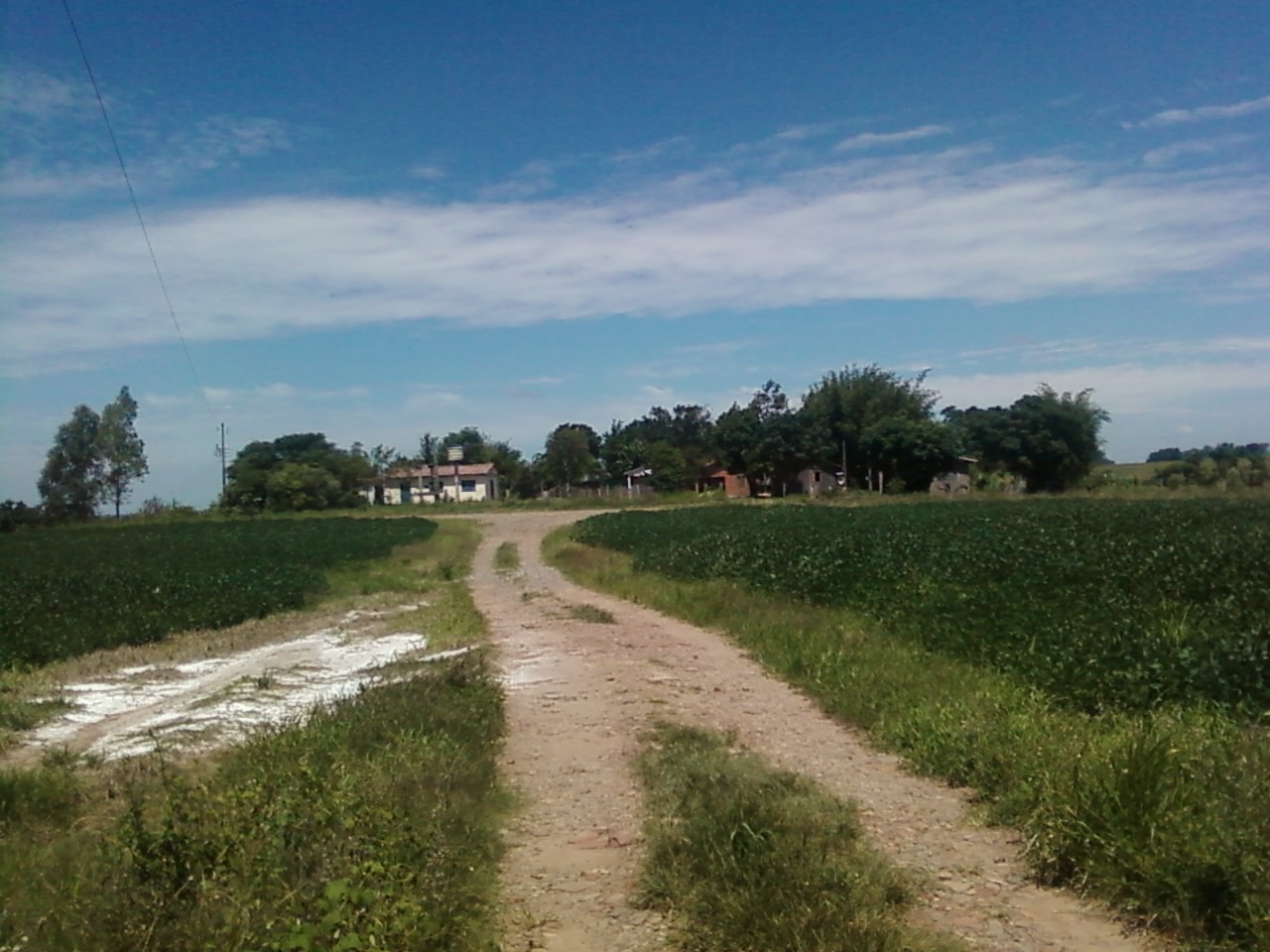

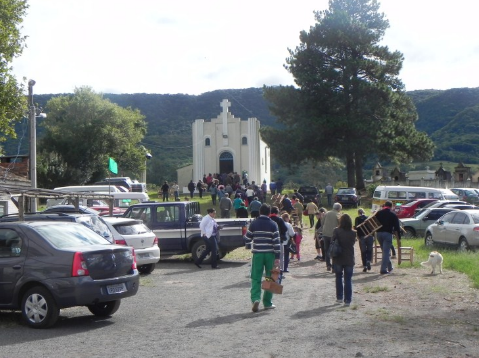

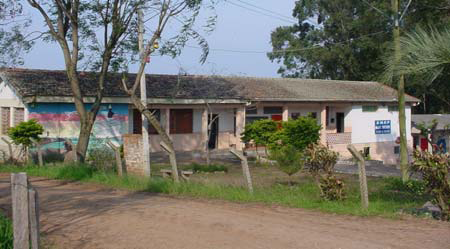
