= Nossa Senhora de Fátima =

Nossa Senhora de Fátima, Portuguese for Our Lady of Fátima, may refer to:

- Nossa Senhora de Fátima (Lisbon), former parish of Lisbon, Portugal
- Nossa Senhora de Fátima, Macau, freguesia in Macau
- Nossa Senhora de Fátima, Santa Maria, bairro in Santa Maria, Rio Grande do Sul, Brazil
