= Noal =

- Bairro
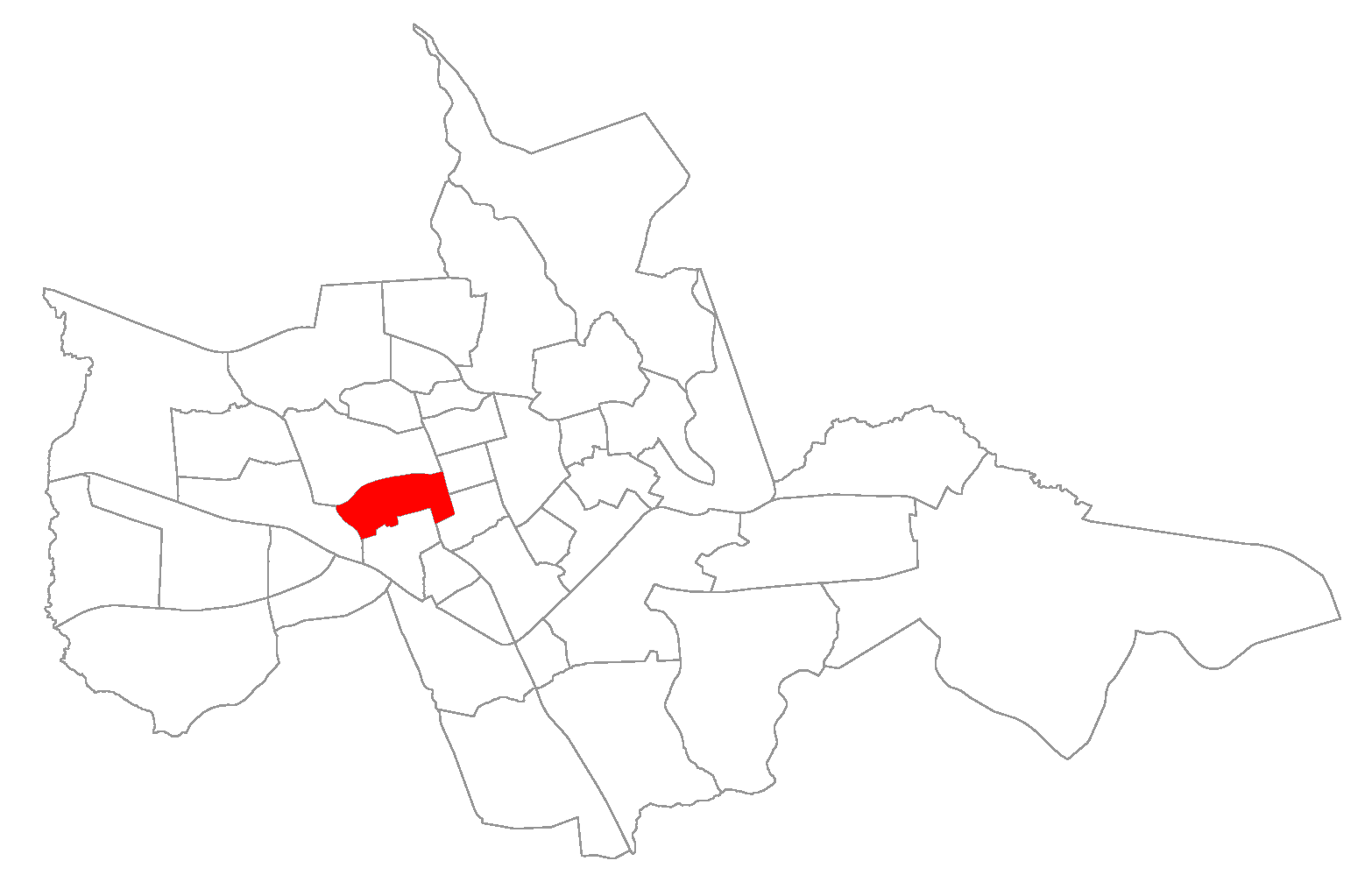
- The bairro in District of Sede

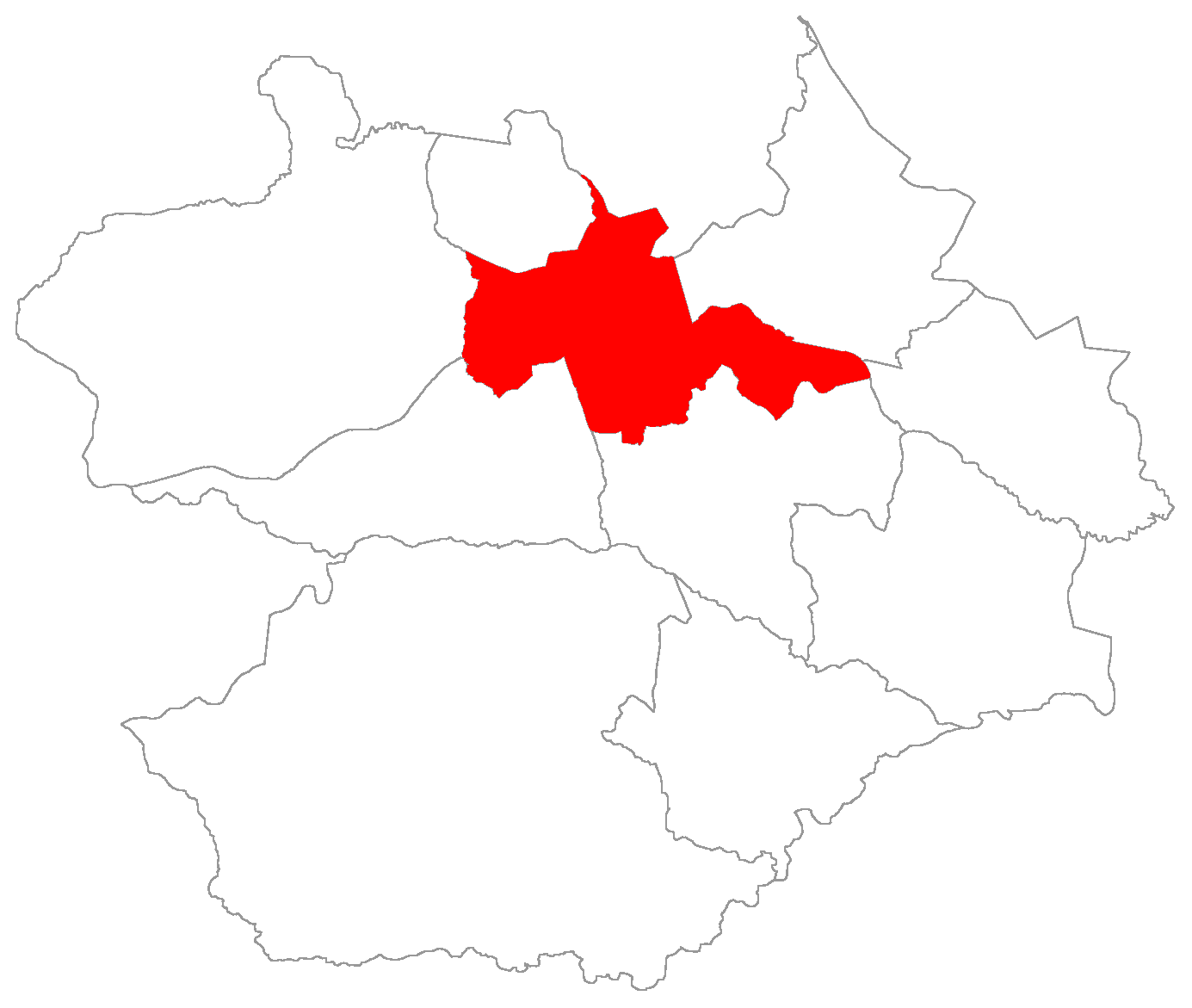
- District of Sede, in Santa Maria City, Rio Grande do Sul, Brazil
- Coordinates: 29°41′33.33″S 53°49′45.79″W
- Country: Brazil
- State: Rio Grande do Sul
- municipality/City: Santa Maria
- District: District of Sede

Area
  - Total: 1.3349 km^{2} (0.5154 sq mi)

Population
  - Total: 7,582
  - Density: 5,680/km^{2} (14,710/sq mi)
- Postal code: 97.020-010 to 97.021-899
- Adjacent bairros: Bonfim, Juscelino Kubitschek, Nossa Senhora de Fátima, Passo d'Areia, Patronato.
- Website: Official site of Santa Maria

Noal is a bairro in the District of Sede in the municipality of Santa Maria, in the Brazilian state of Rio Grande do Sul. It is located in west Santa Maria.

== Villages ==
The bairro contains the following villages: Noal, Vila Arco-Íris, Vila Kosoroski, Vila Lídia, Vila Natal, Vila Noal, Vila Pantaleão, Vila Rohde, Vila San Martin.

== Gallery of photos ==
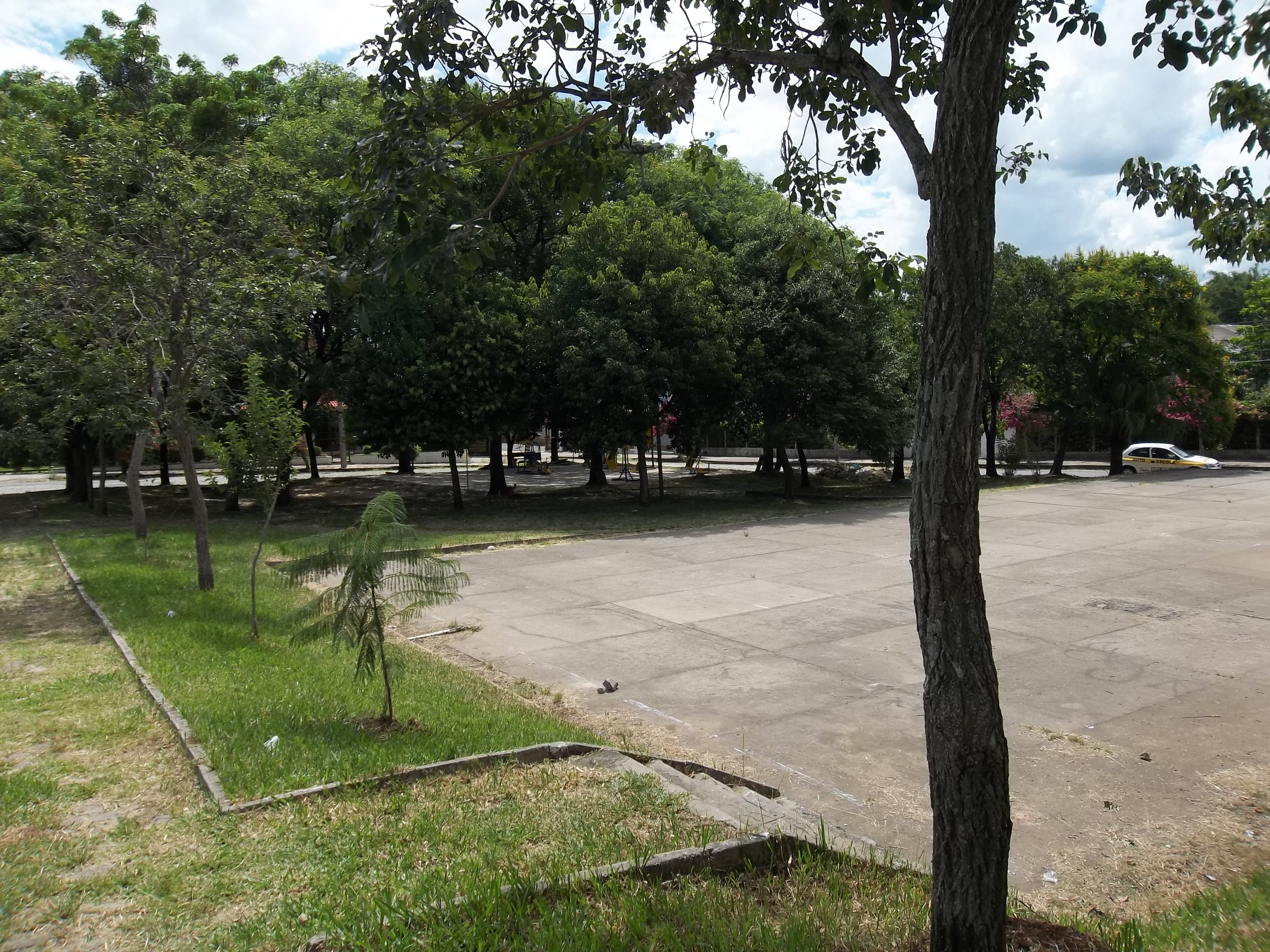

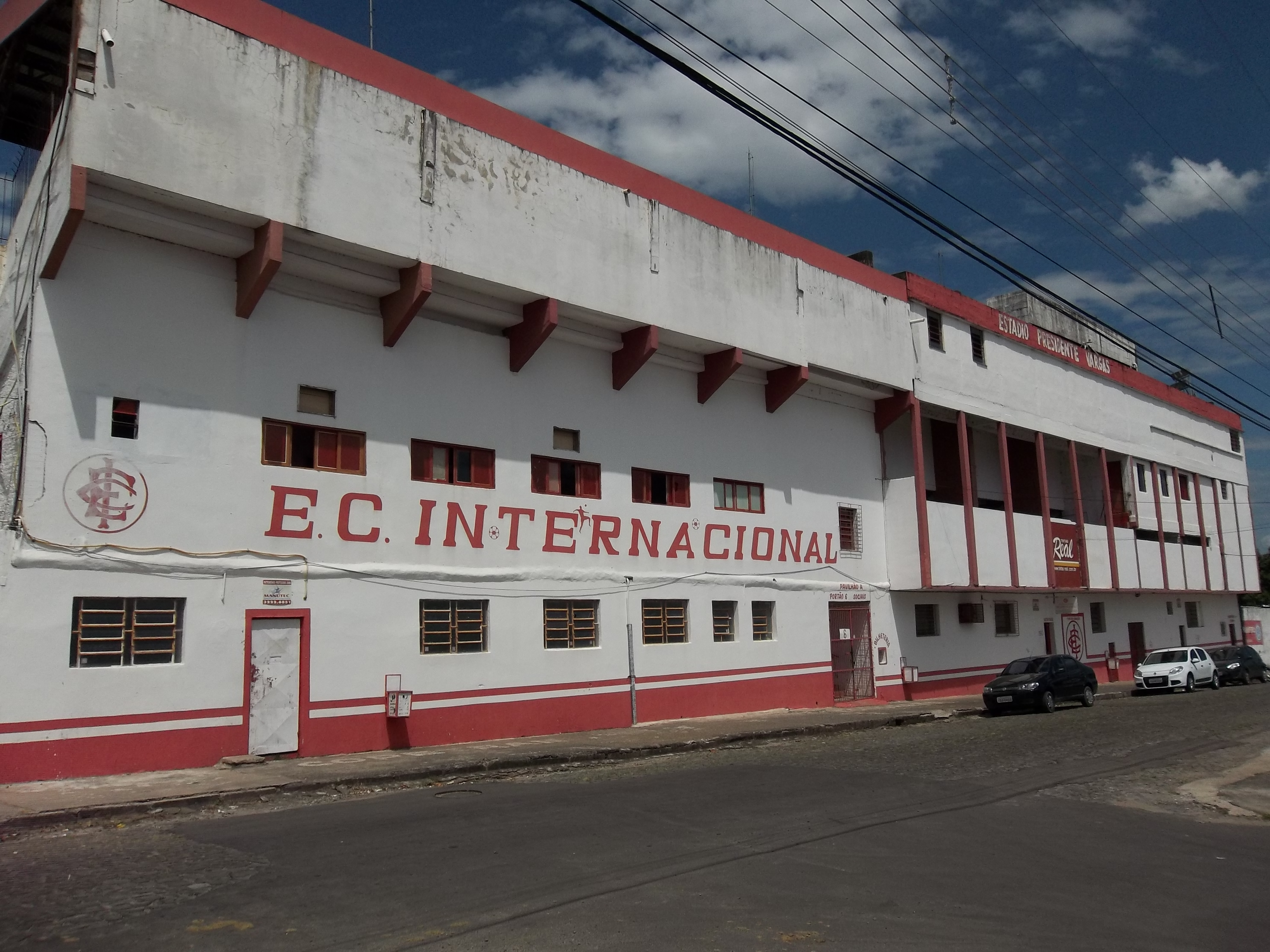

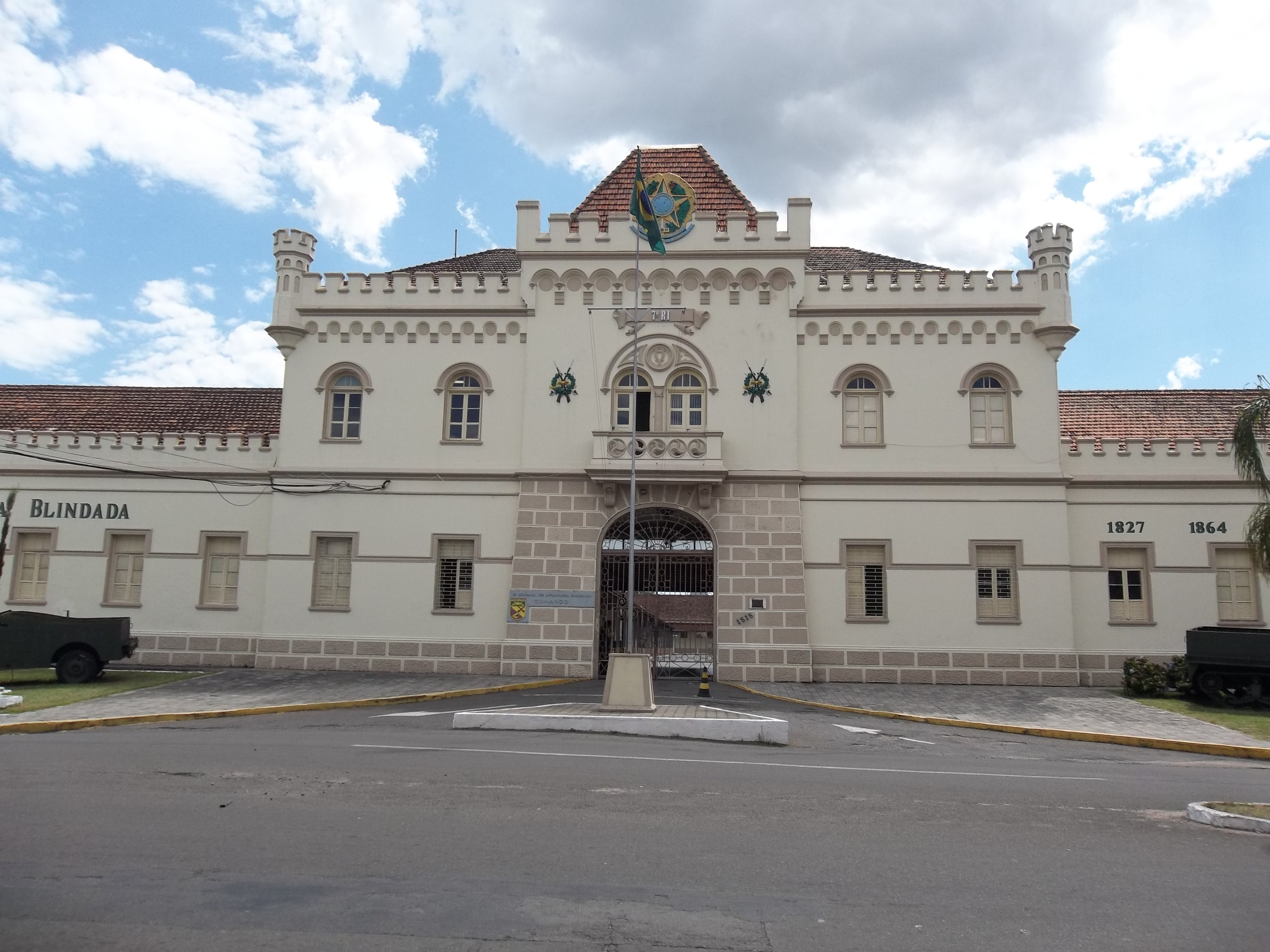
