= Patronato, Santa Maria =

Patronato
- Bairro
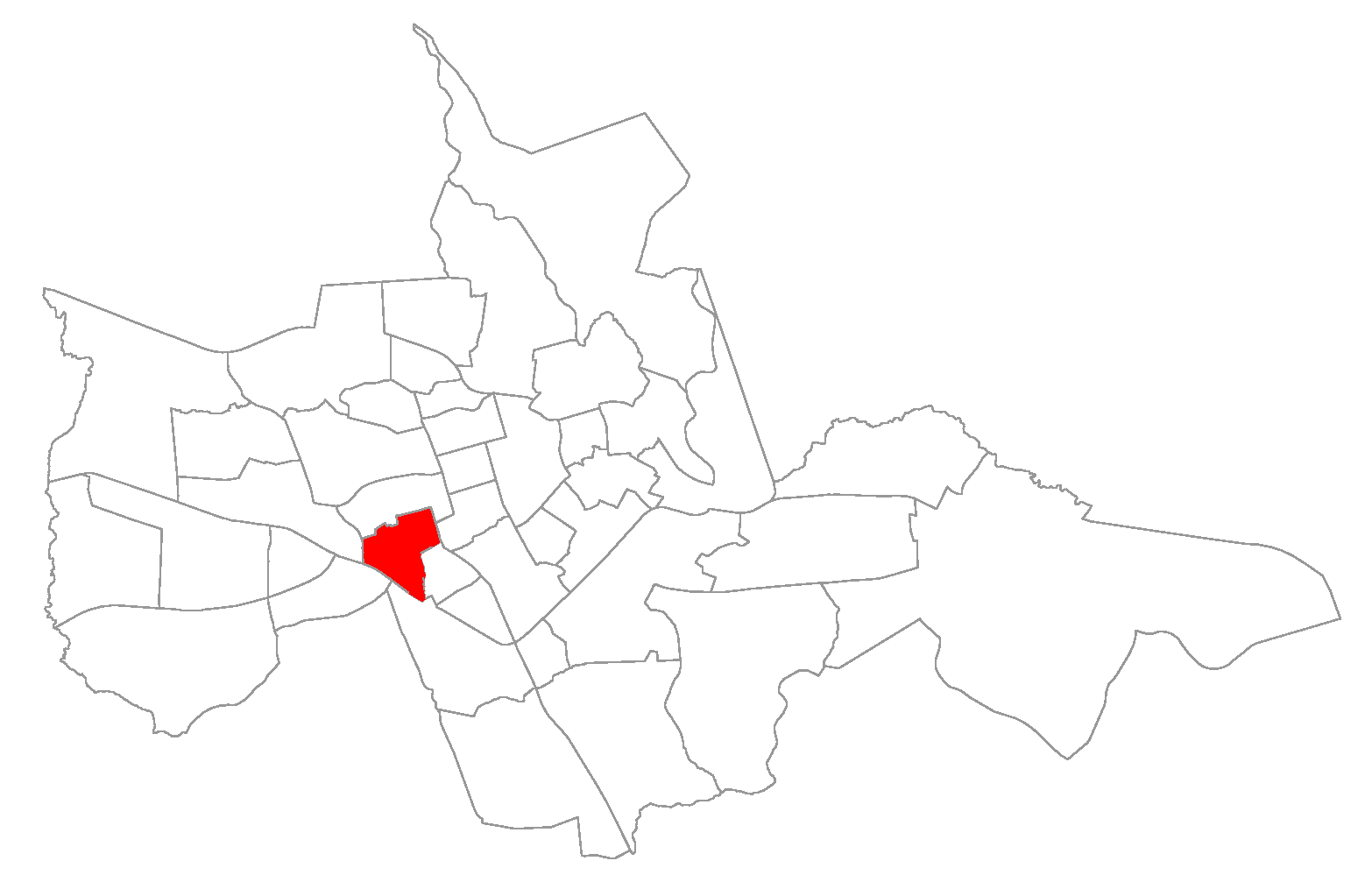
- The bairro in District of Sede

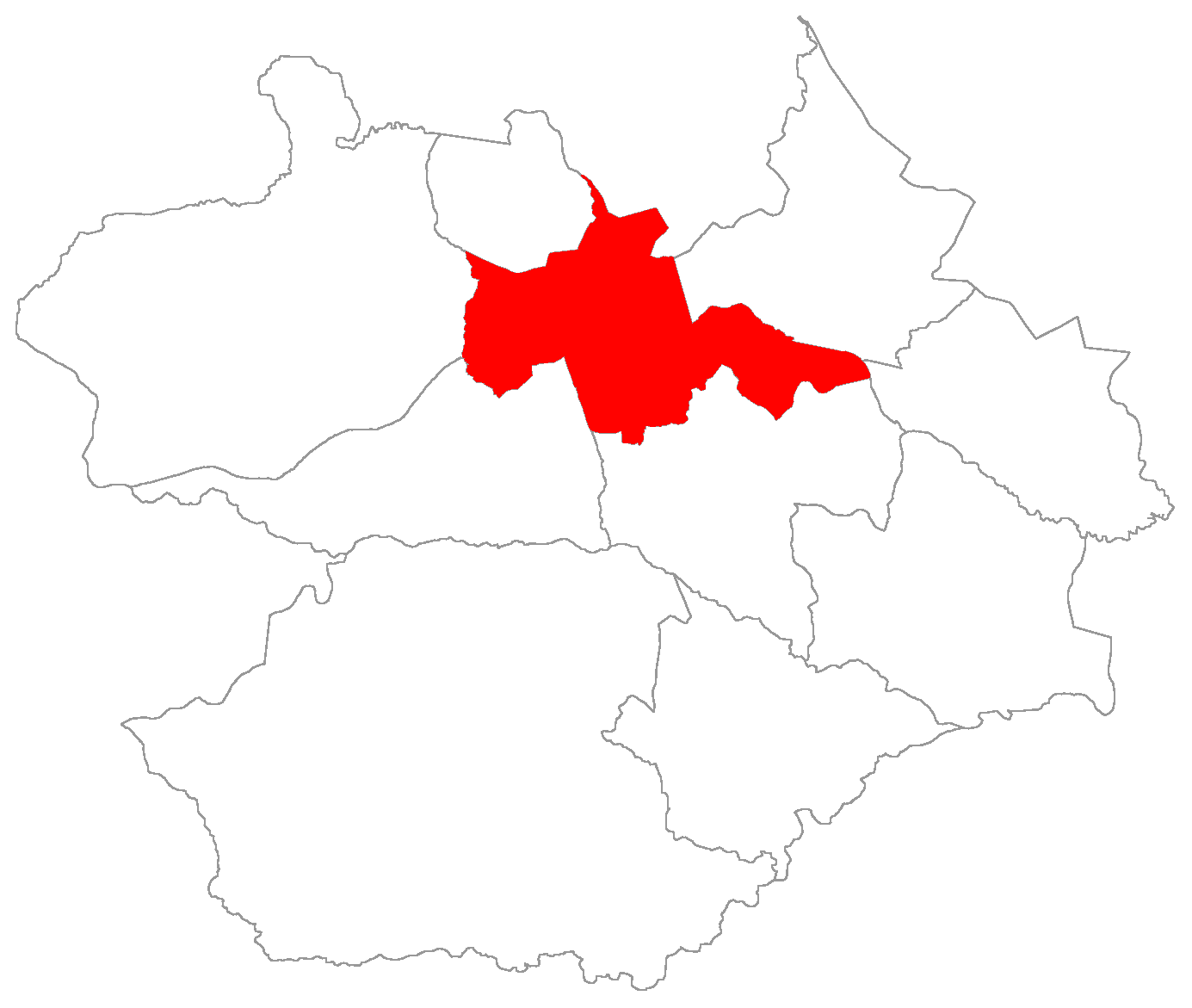
- District of Sede, in Santa Maria City, Rio Grande do Sul, Brazil
- Coordinates: 29°42′01.73″S 53°49′41.03″W
- Country: Brazil
- State: Rio Grande do Sul
- Municipality/City: Santa Maria
- District: District of Sede

Area
  - Total: 1.1036 km^{2} (0.4261 sq mi)

Population
  - Total: 2,575
  - Density: 2,333/km^{2} (6,043/sq mi)
- Postal code: 97.020-000 to 97.020-899
- Adjacent bairros: Duque de Caxias, Juscelino Kubitschek, Noal, Nossa Senhora de Fátima, Renascença, Urlândia.
- Website: Official site of Santa Maria

Patronato (Portuguese pronunciation: [patɾoˈnatu], "Patronage") is a bairro in the District of Sede in the municipality of Santa Maria, in the Brazilian state of Rio Grande do Sul. It is located in center-west Santa Maria.

== Villages ==
The bairro contains the following villages: Parque Residencial Padre Caetano, Patronato, Vila Dois de Novembro, Vila Guarani, Vila Plátano.

== Gallery of photos ==
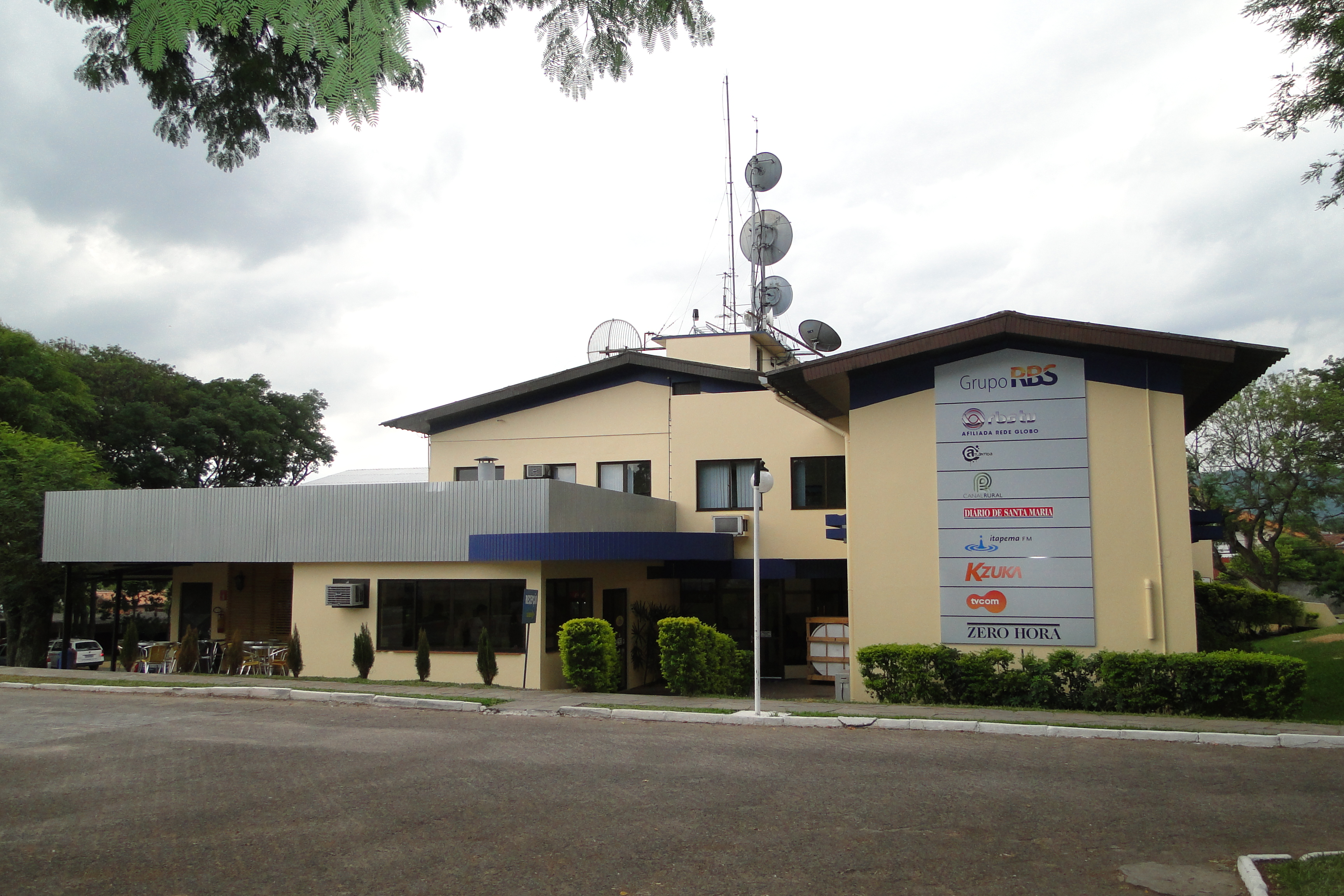

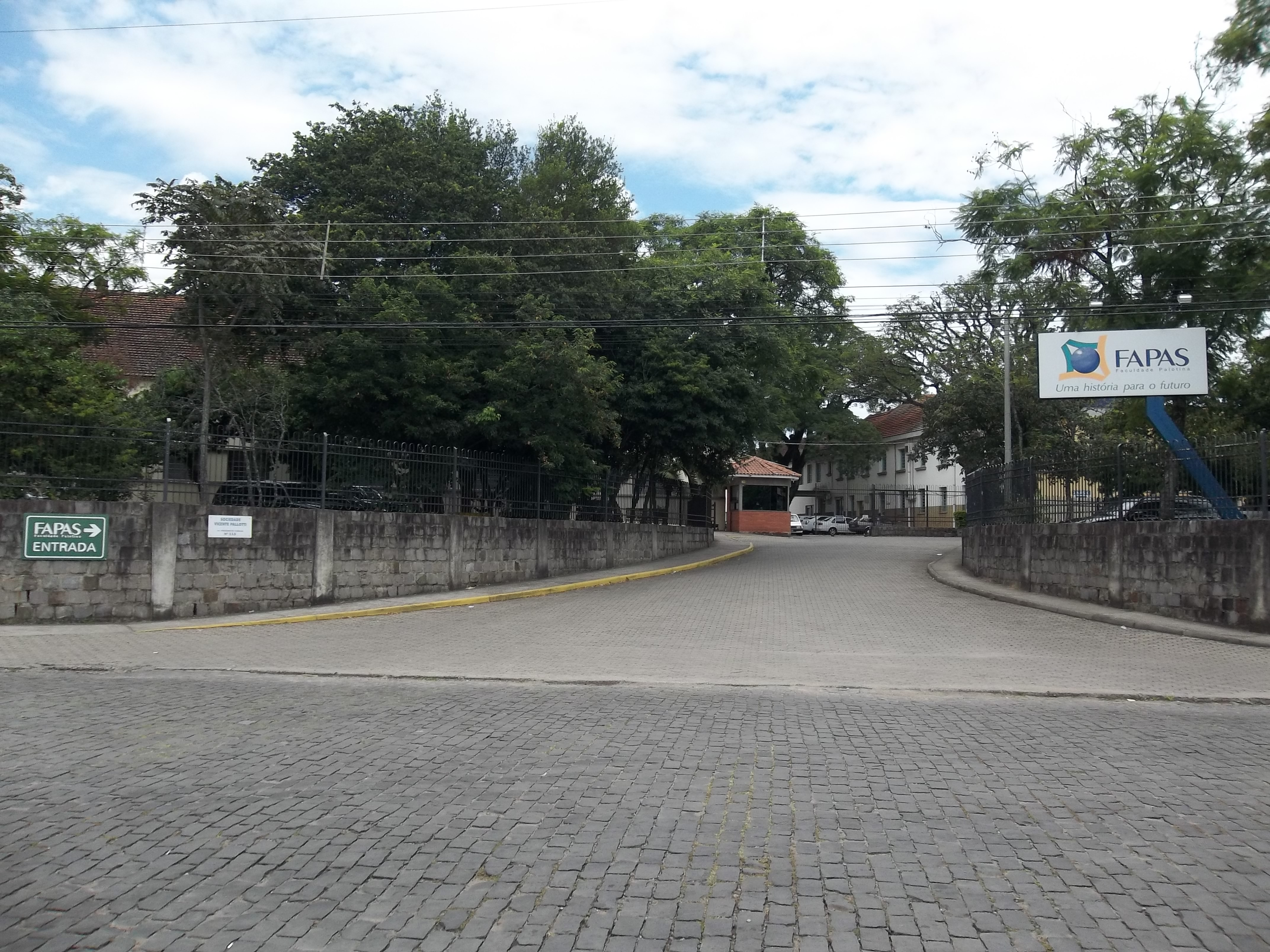

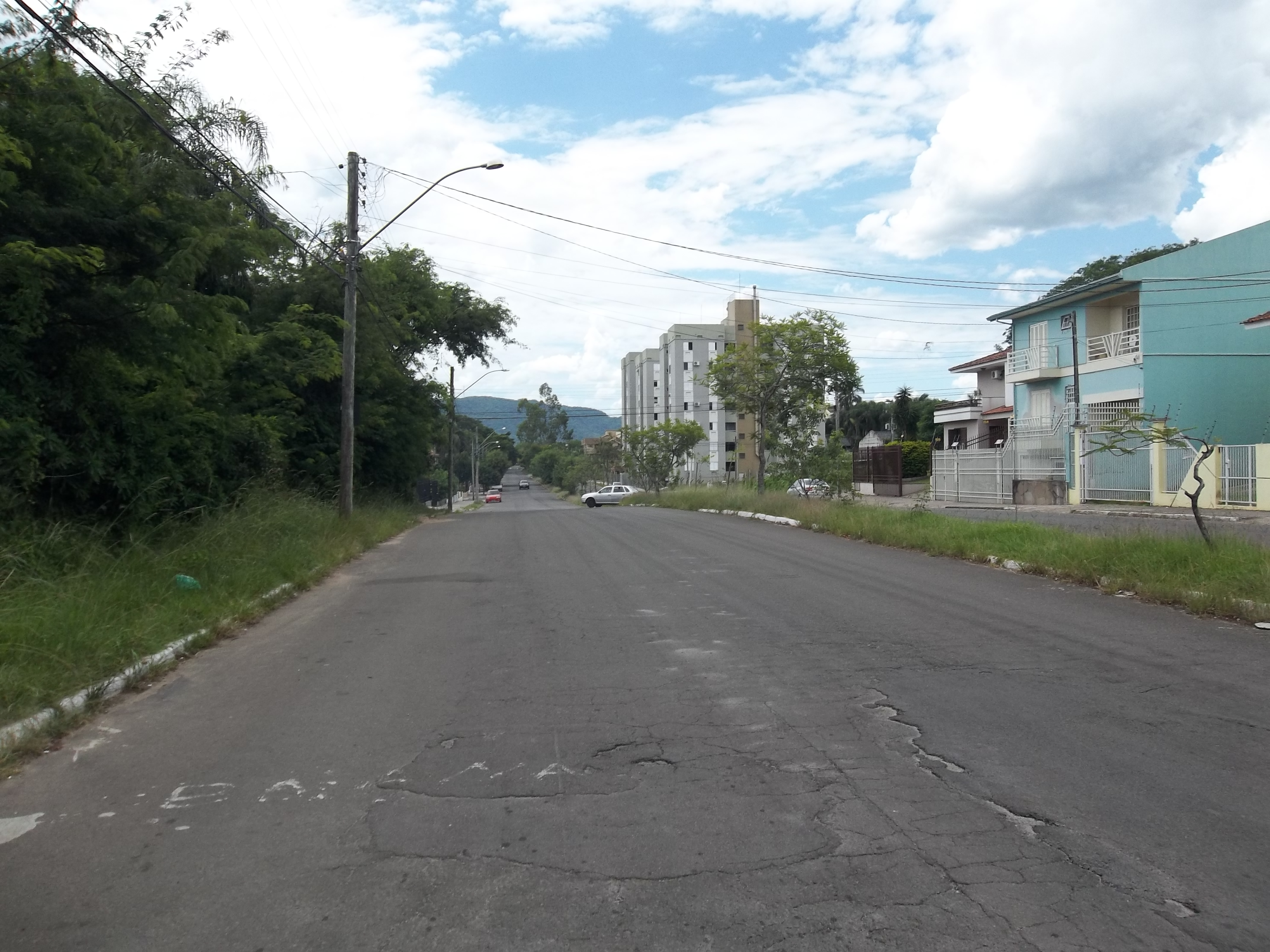
