= Bonfim, Santa Maria =

Bonfim
- Bairro
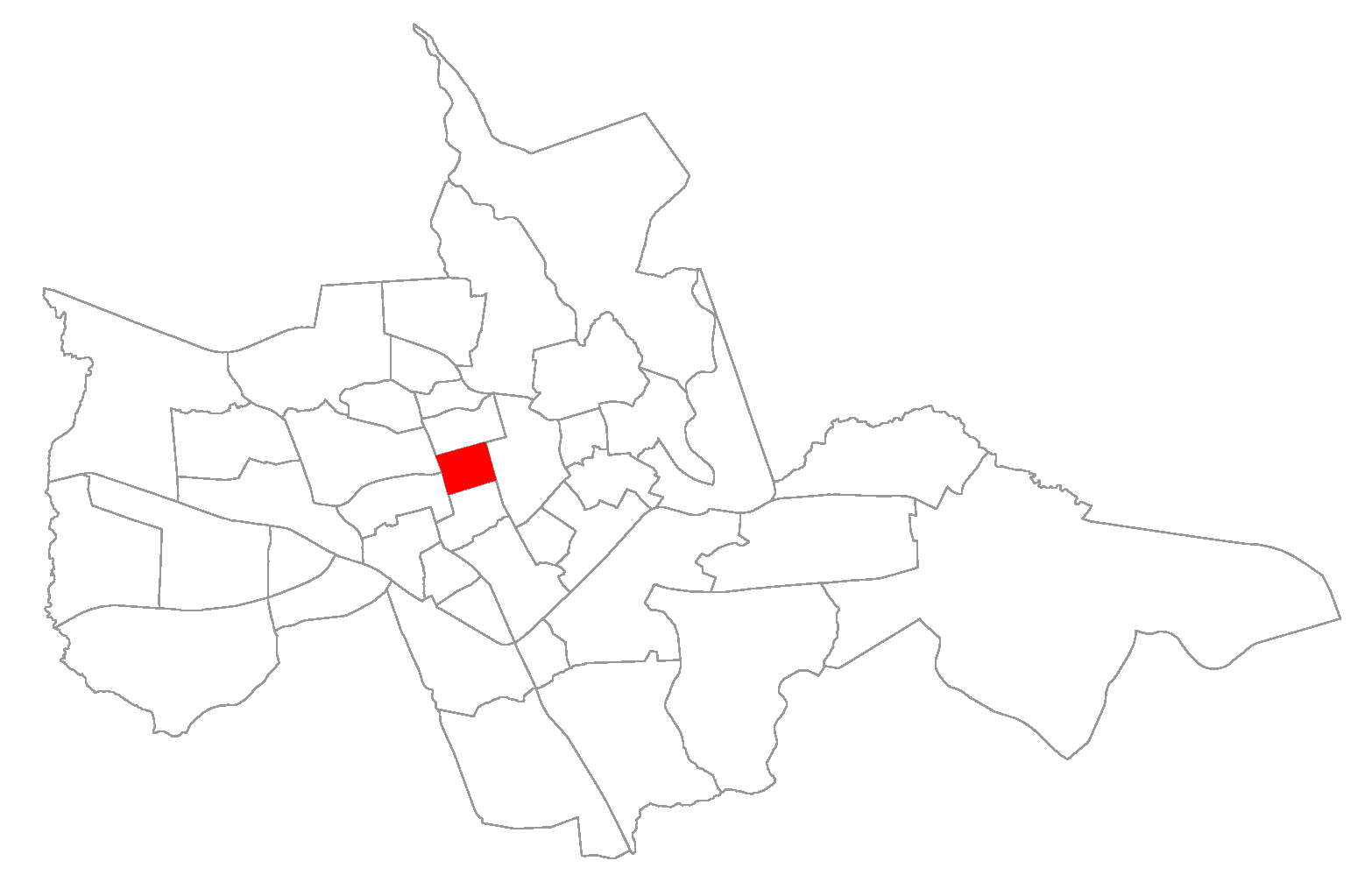
- The bairro in District of Sede

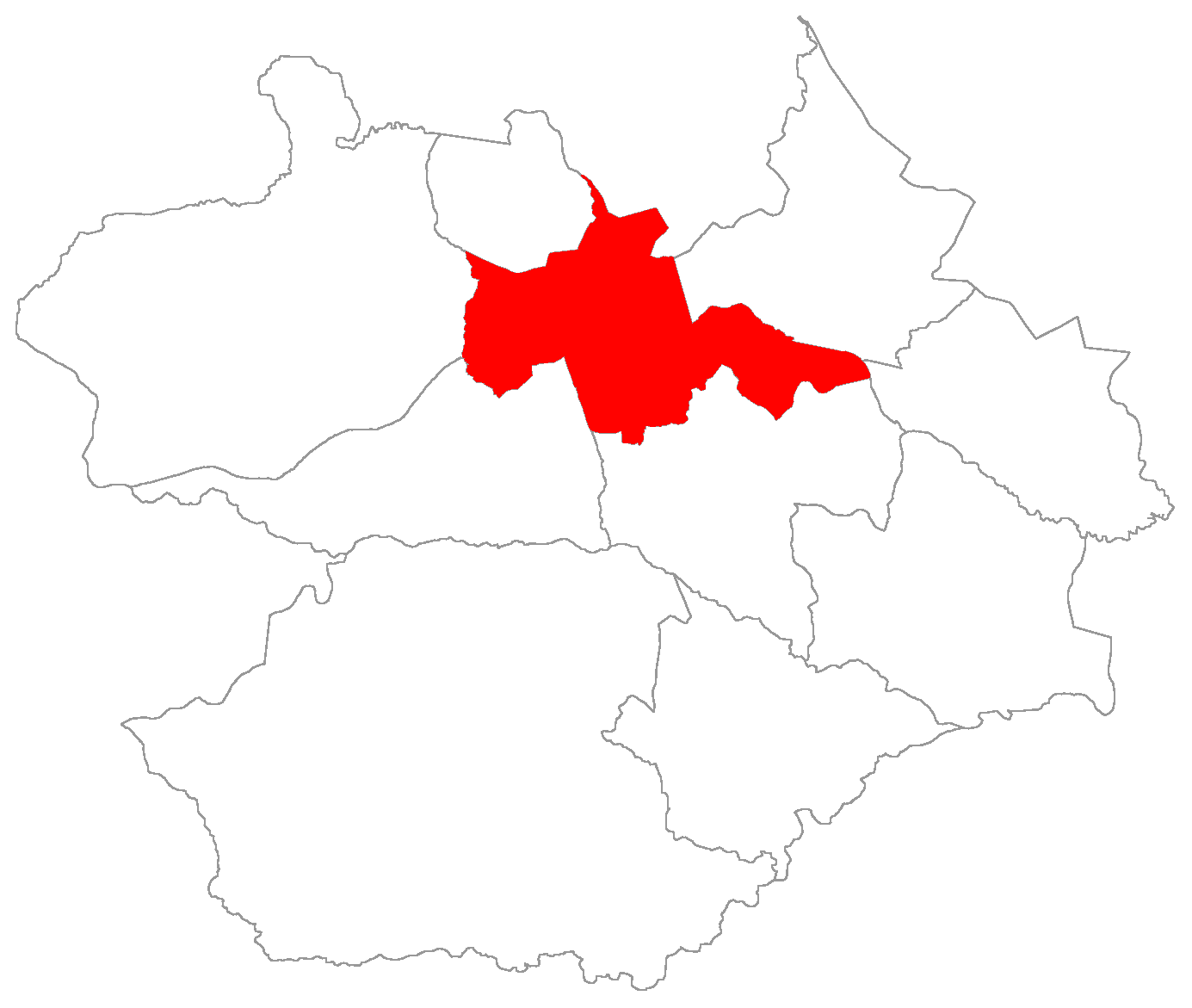
- District of Sede, in Santa Maria City, Rio Grande do Sul, Brazil
- Coordinates: 29°41′16.19″S 53°49′00.81″W
- Country: Brazil
- State: Rio Grande do Sul
- Municipality/City: Santa Maria
- District: District of Sede

Area
  - Total: 0.5616 km^{2} (0.2168 sq mi)

Population
  - Total: 7,157
  - Density: 12,740/km^{2} (33,010/sq mi)
- Postal code: 97.010-002 to 97.015-169
- Adjacent bairros: Centro, Noal, Nossa Senhora de Fátima, Nossa Senhora do Rosário, Passo d'Areia.
- Website: Official site of Santa Maria

Bonfim ("good end") is a bairro in the District of Sede in the municipality of Santa Maria, in the Brazilian state of Rio Grande do Sul. It is located in central Santa Maria.

== Villages ==
The bairro contains the following villages: Bonfim.

== Gallery of photos ==
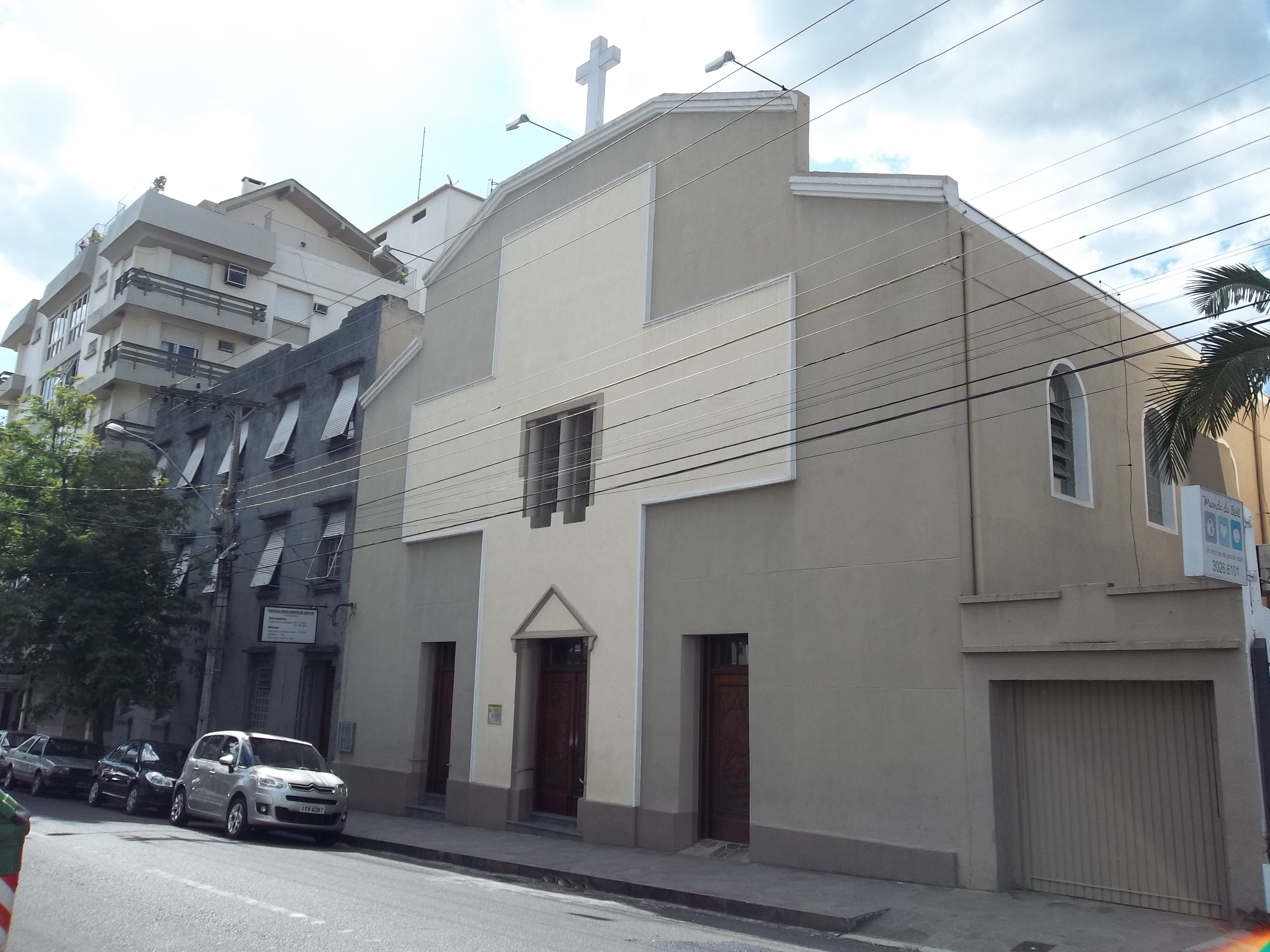

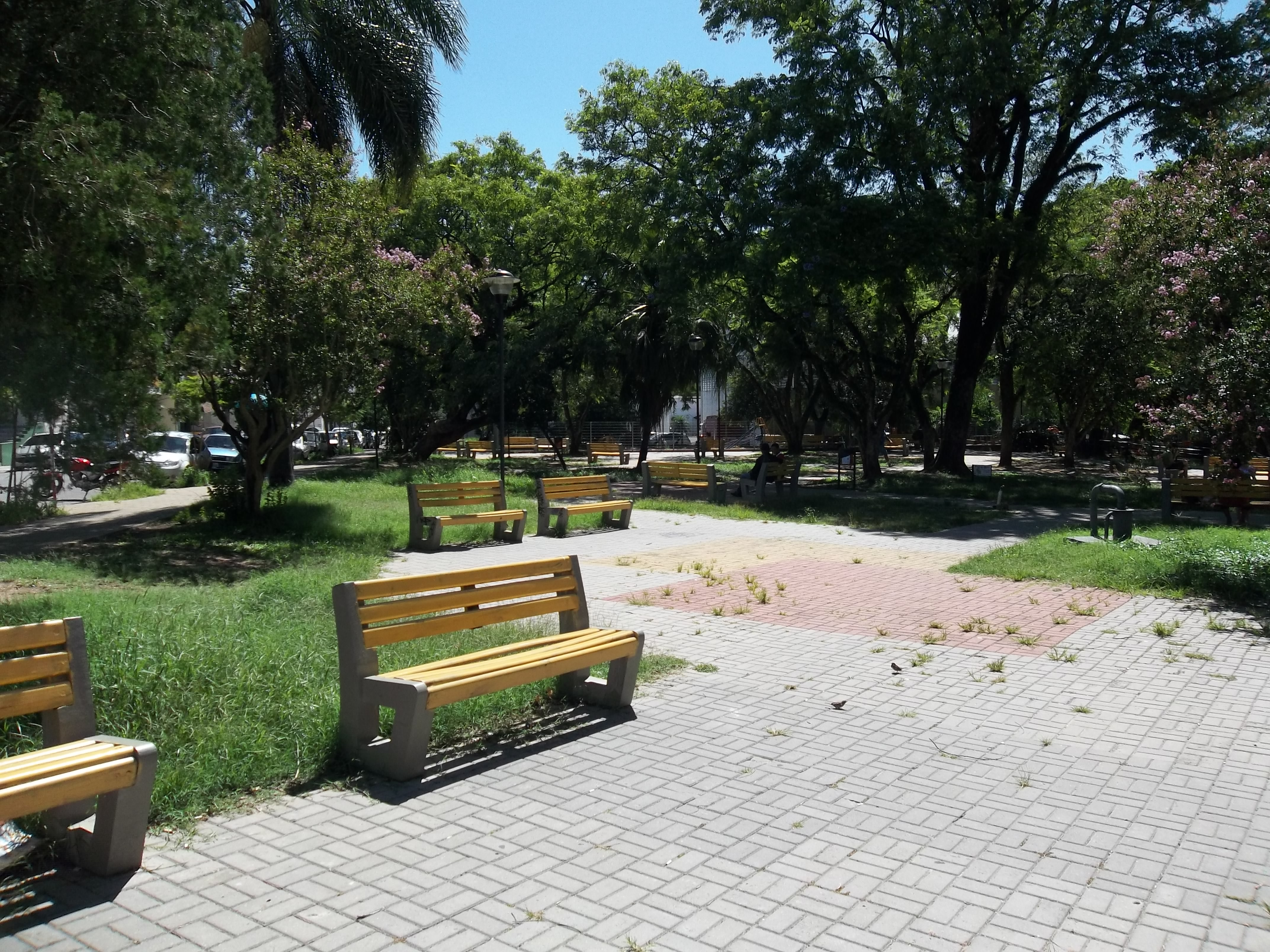

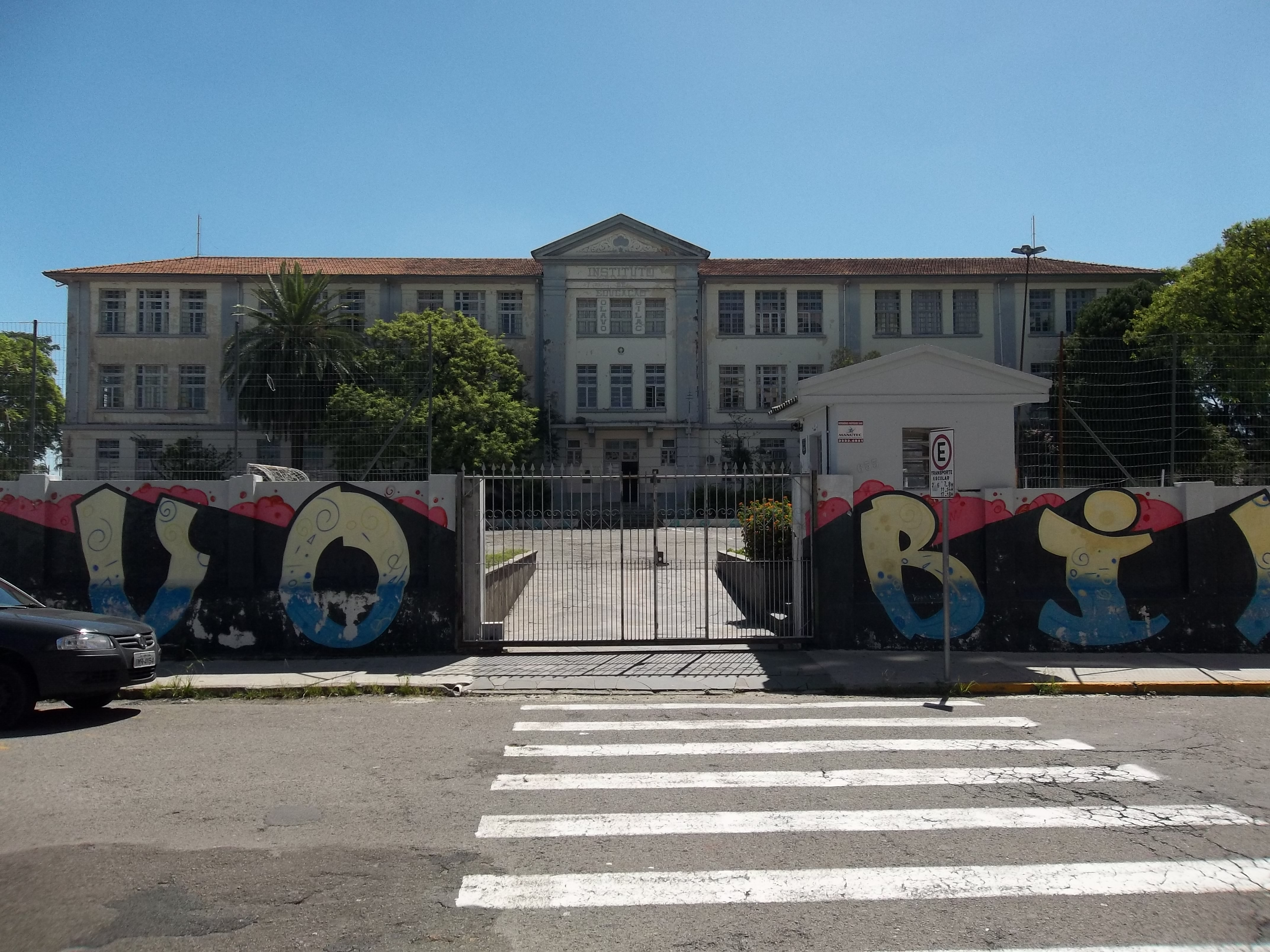

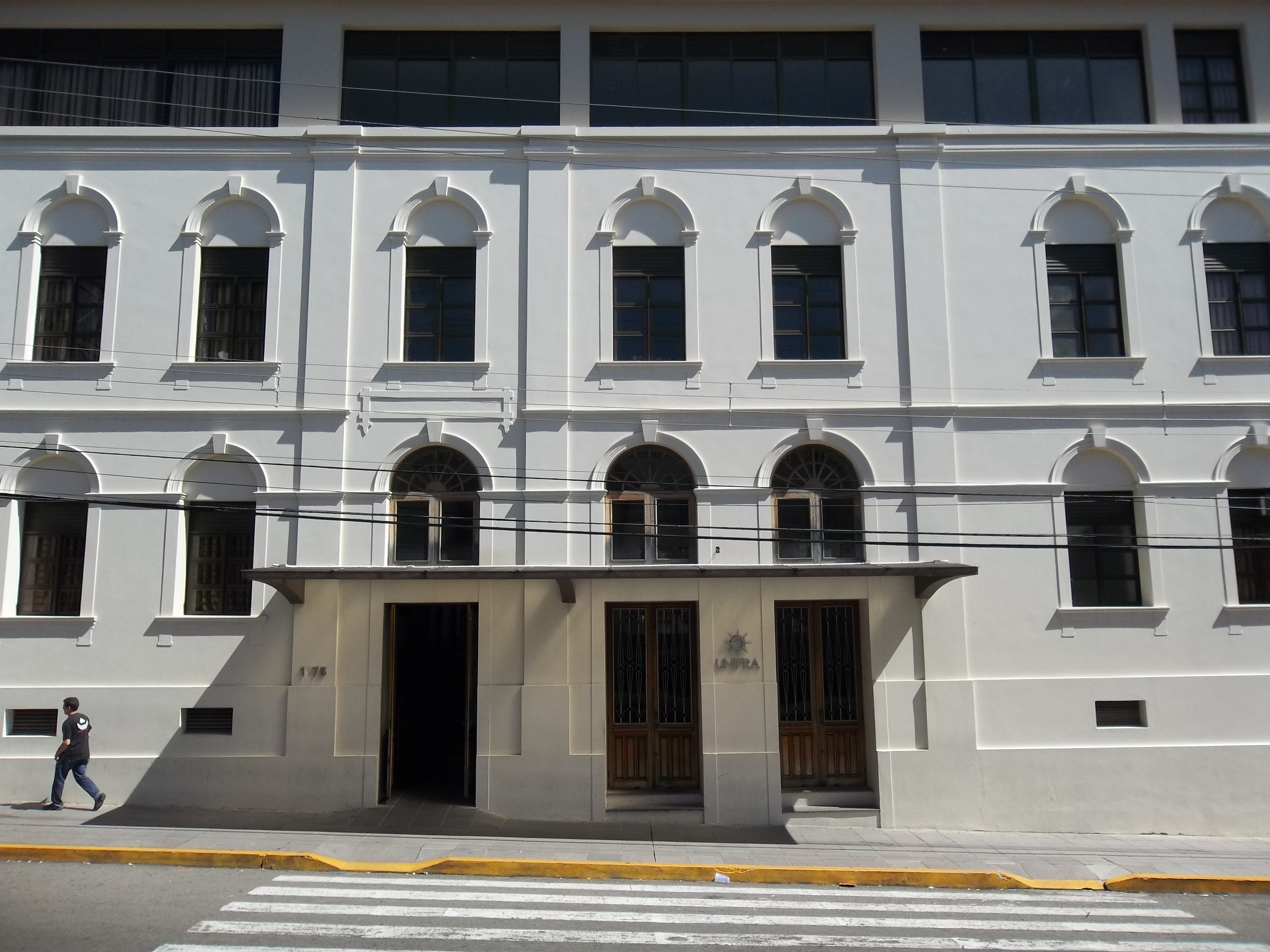

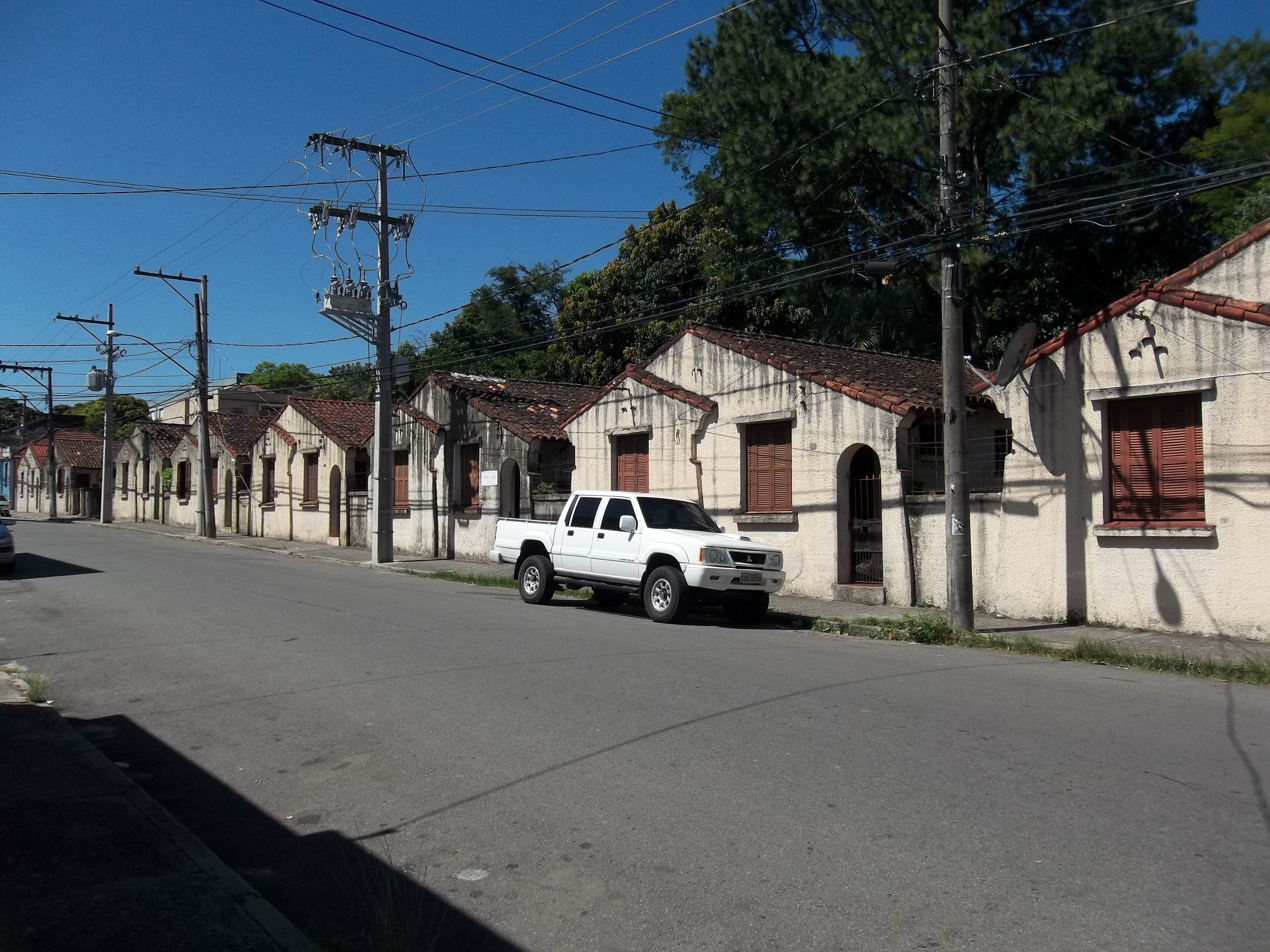

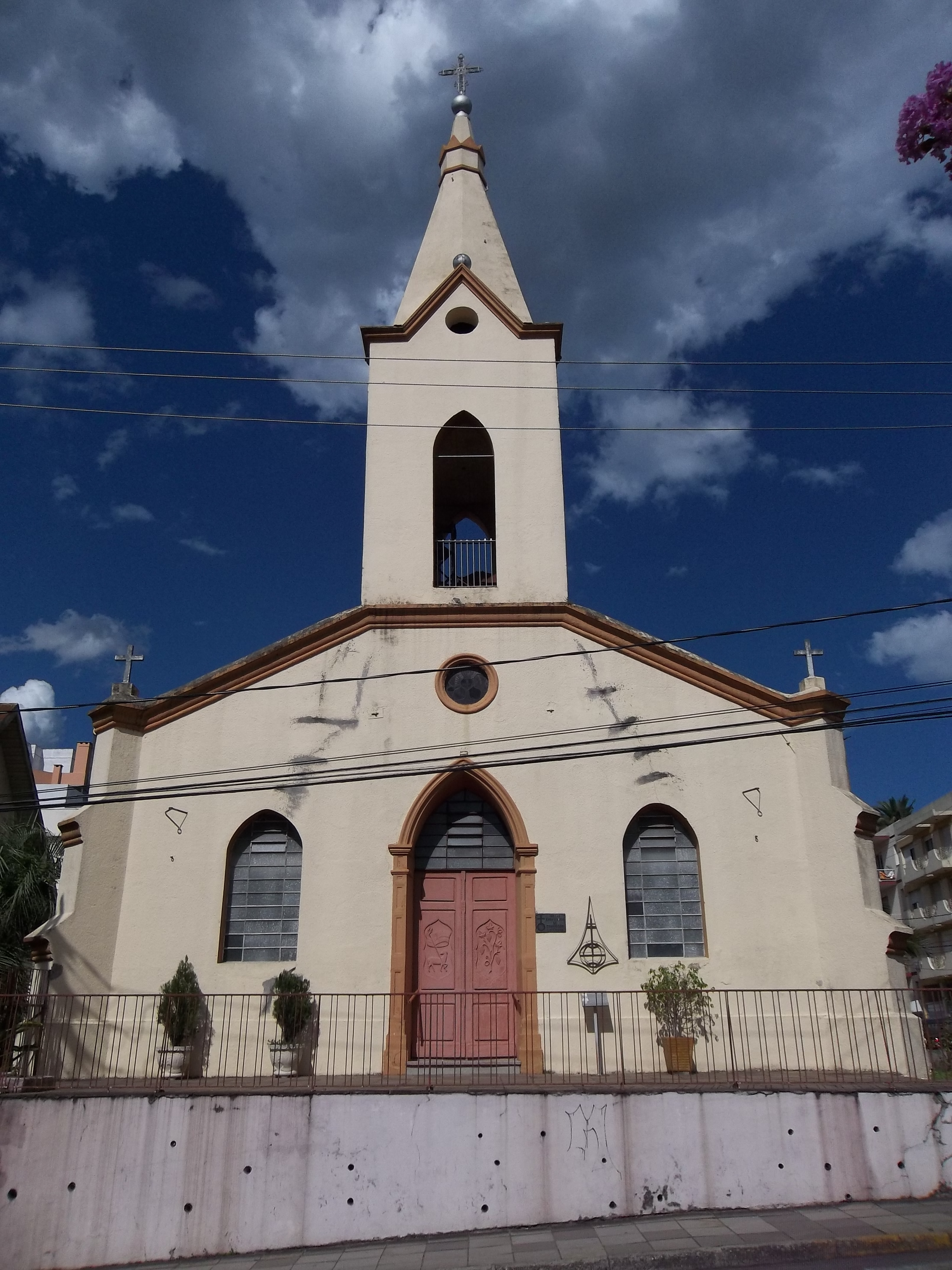

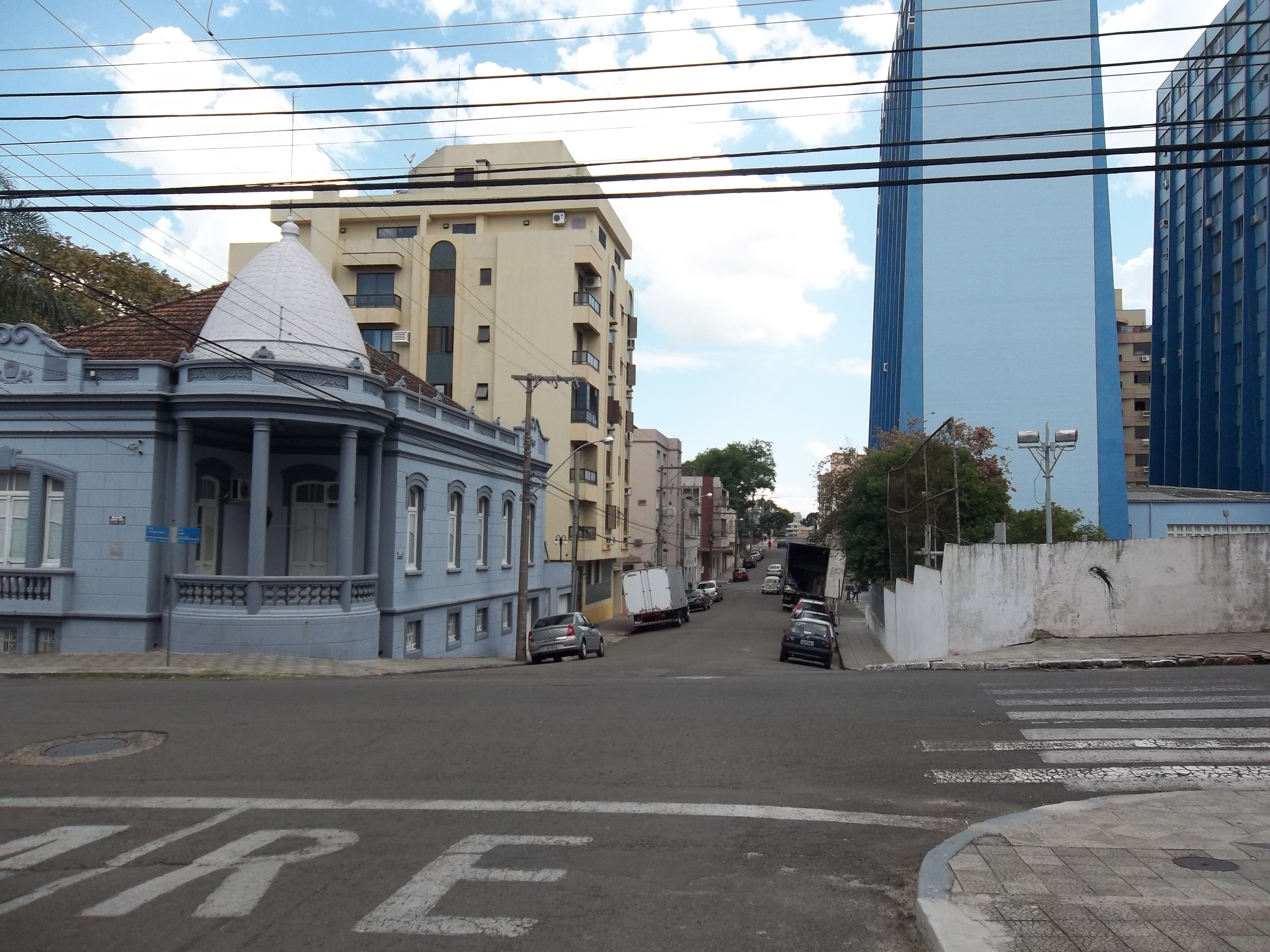
