= Nossa Senhora de Fátima, Santa Maria =

Nossa Senhora de Fátima
- Bairro
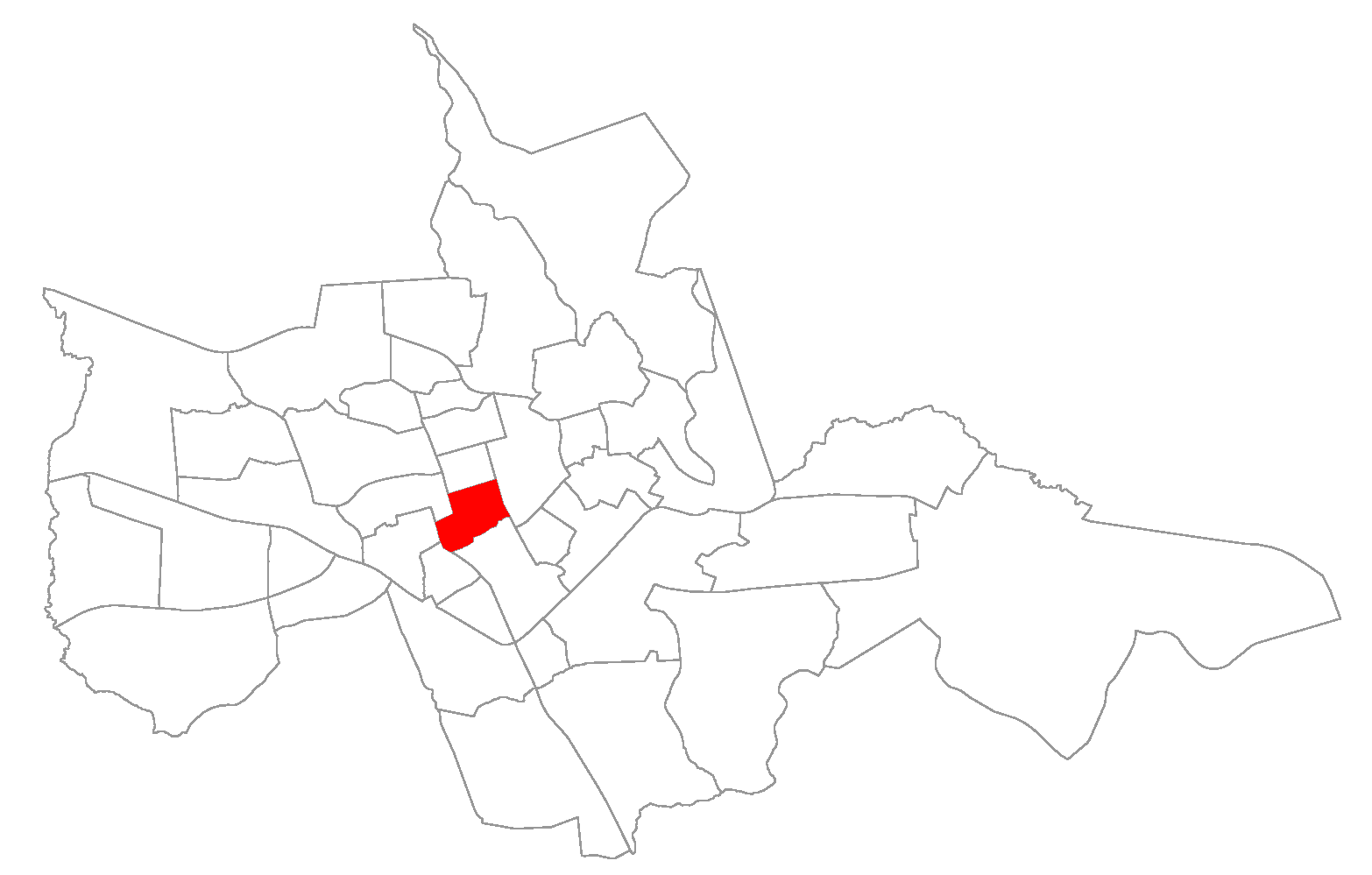
- The bairro in District of Sede

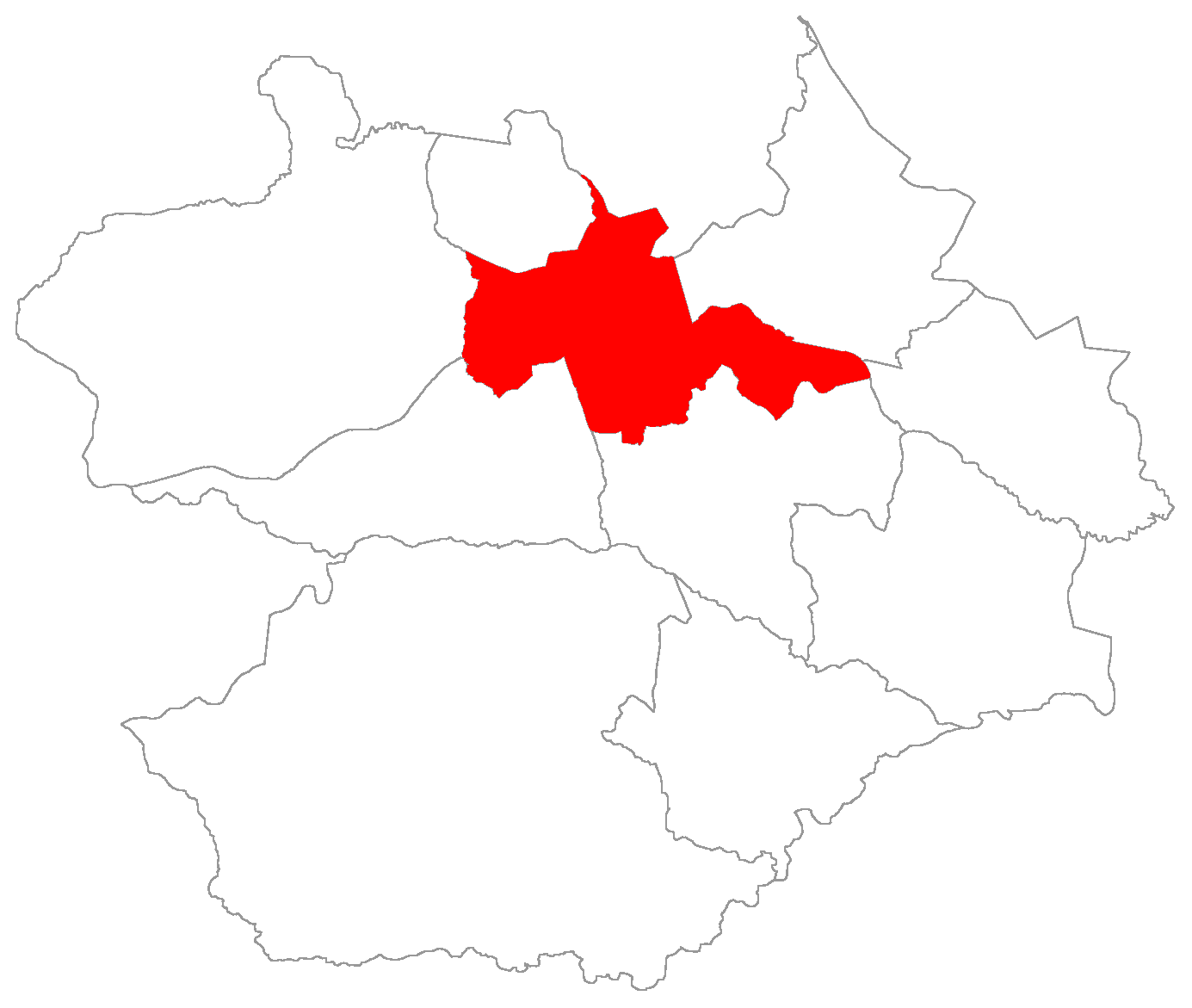
- District of Sede, in Santa Maria City, Rio Grande do Sul, Brazil
- Coordinates: 29°41′42.74″S 53°48′59.46″W
- Country: Brazil
- State: Rio Grande do Sul
- Municipality/City: Santa Maria
- District: District of Sede

Area
  - Total: 0.8444 km^{2} (0.3260 sq mi)

Population
  - Total: 8,836
  - Density: 10,460/km^{2} (27,100/sq mi)
- Postal code: 97.010-080 to 97.015-661
- Adjacent bairros: Bonfim, Centro, Duque de Caxias, Noal, Nossa Senhora Medianeira, Patronato.
- Website: Official site of Santa Maria

Nossa Senhora de Fátima ("Our Lady of Fátima") is a bairro in the District of Sede in the municipality of Santa Maria, in the Brazilian state of Rio Grande do Sul. It is located in central Santa Maria.

== Villages ==
The bairro contains the following villages: Fátima, Vila Antônio Corrêa, Vila Holtermann, Vila Militar, Vila Selmer.

== Gallery of photos ==
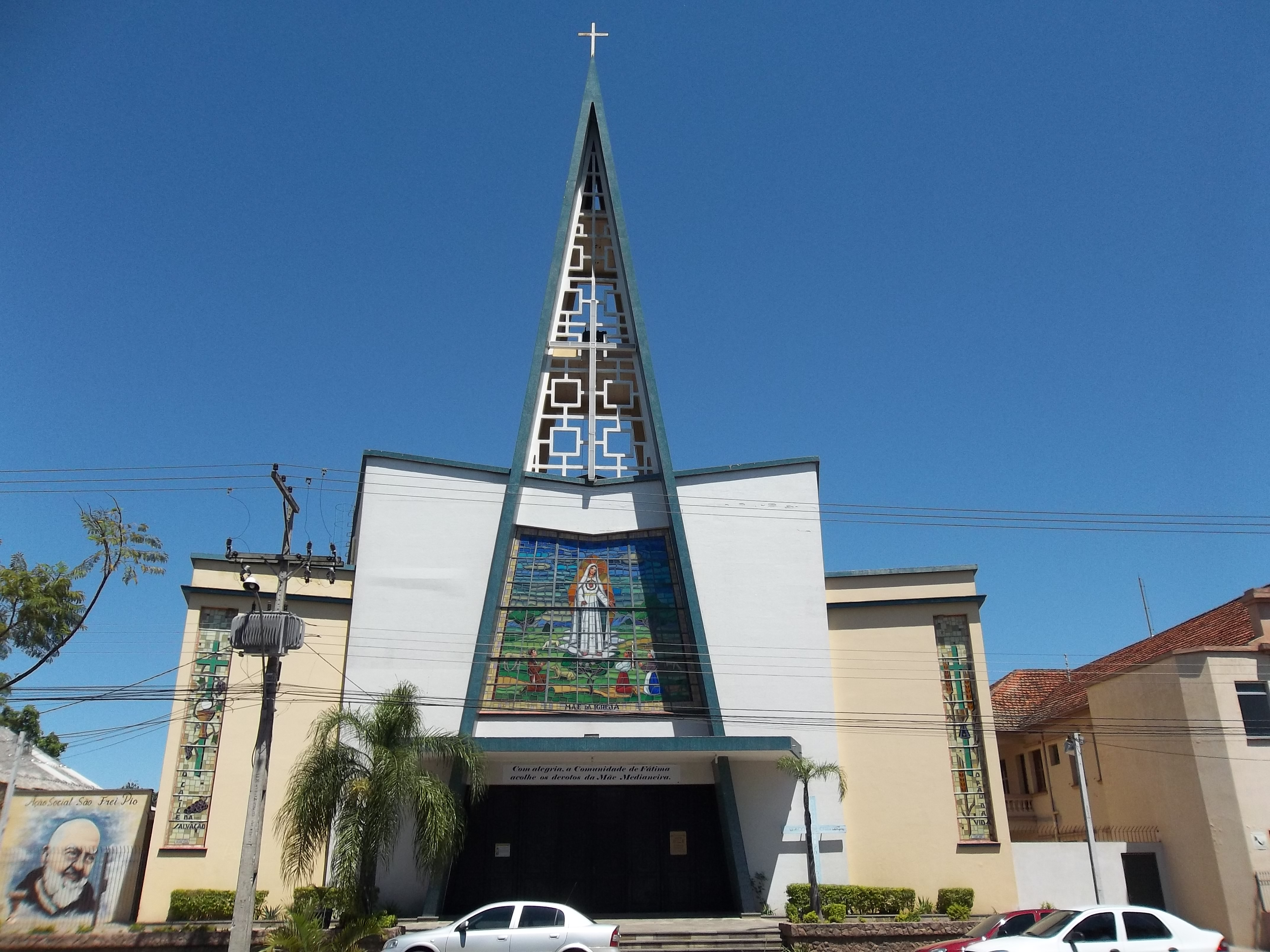

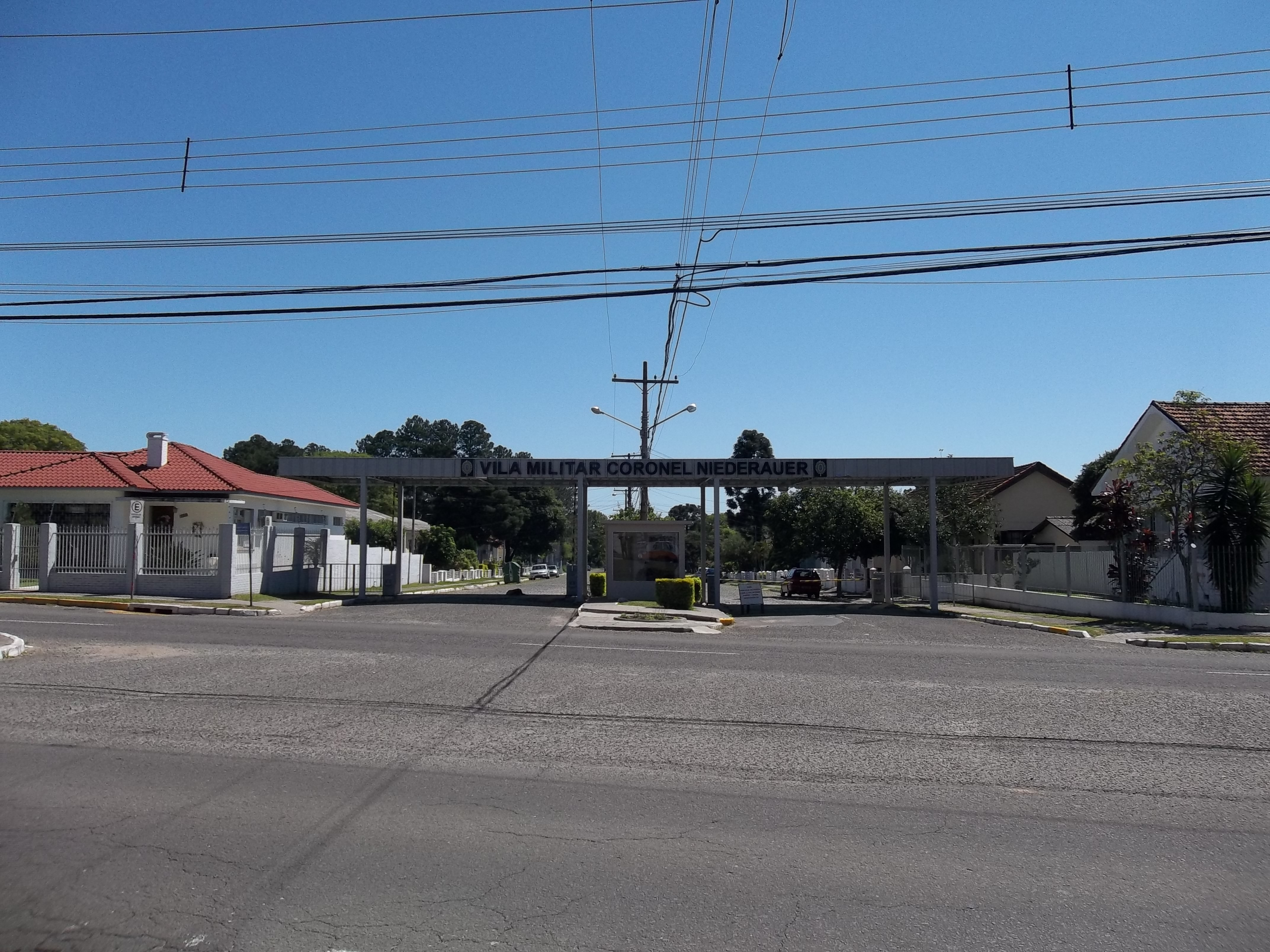

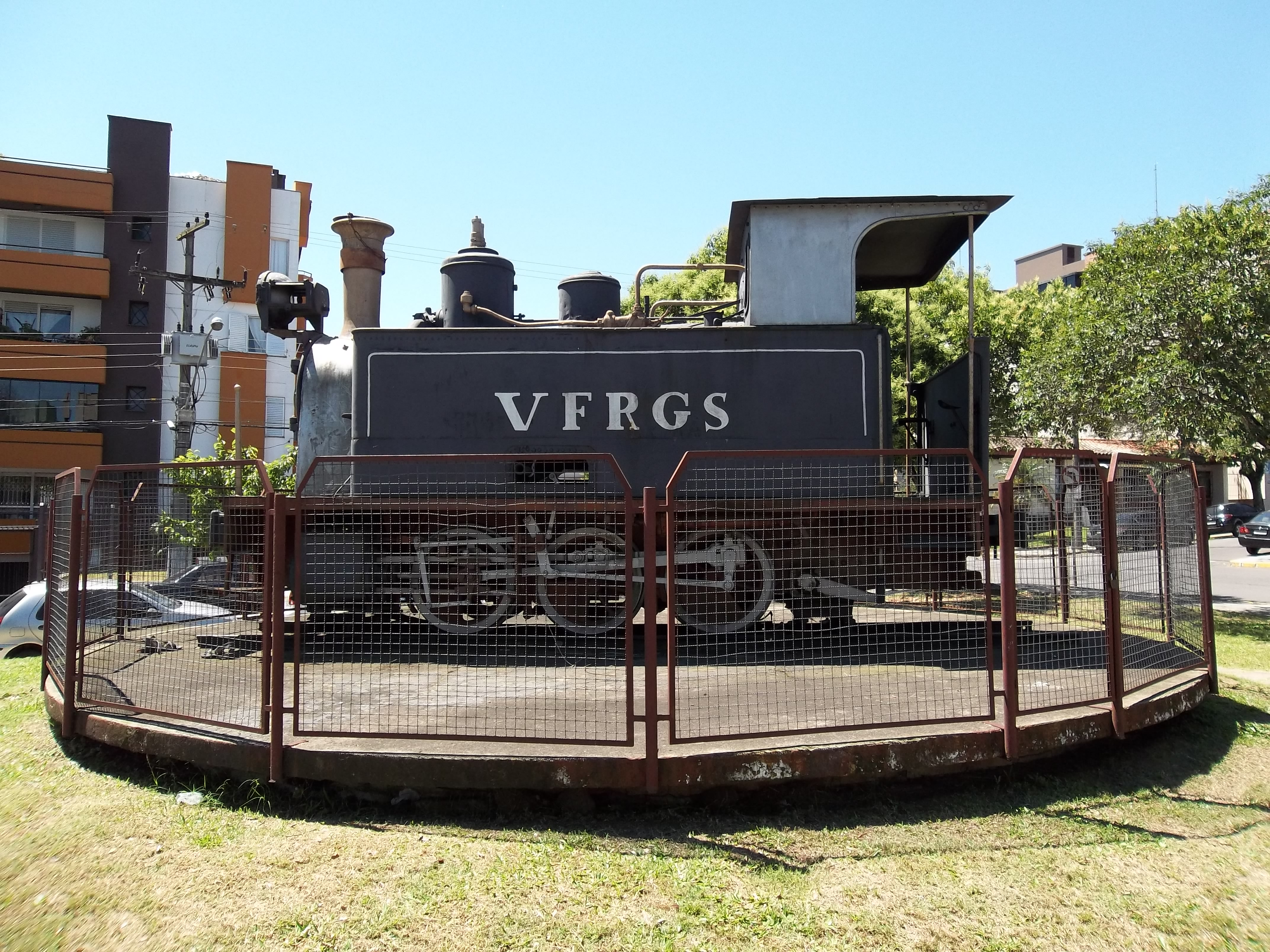

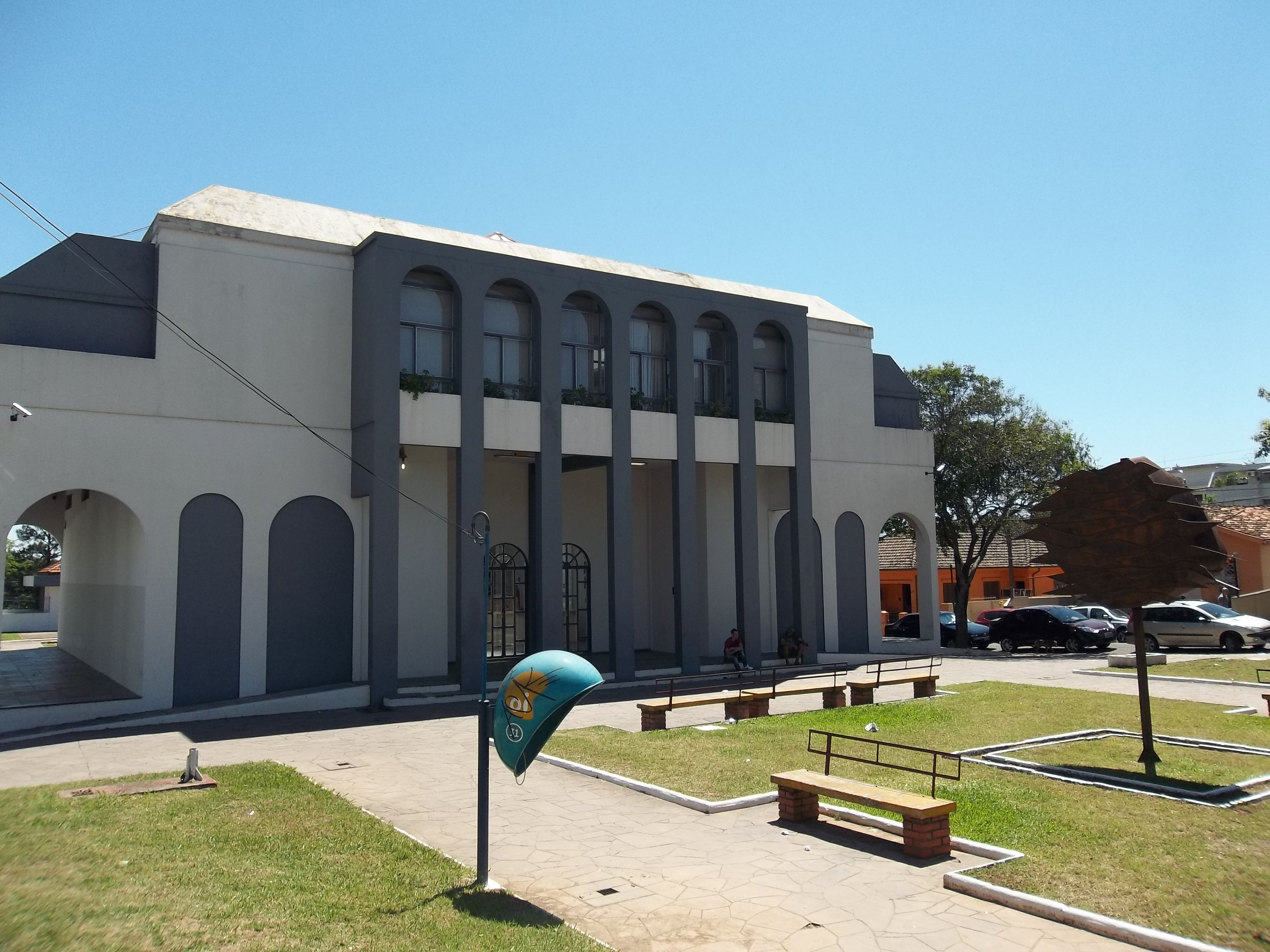
